= Råbylille Strand =

Resort in Møn, Denmark

Coordinates: 54°58′3.24″N 12°23′17.87″E

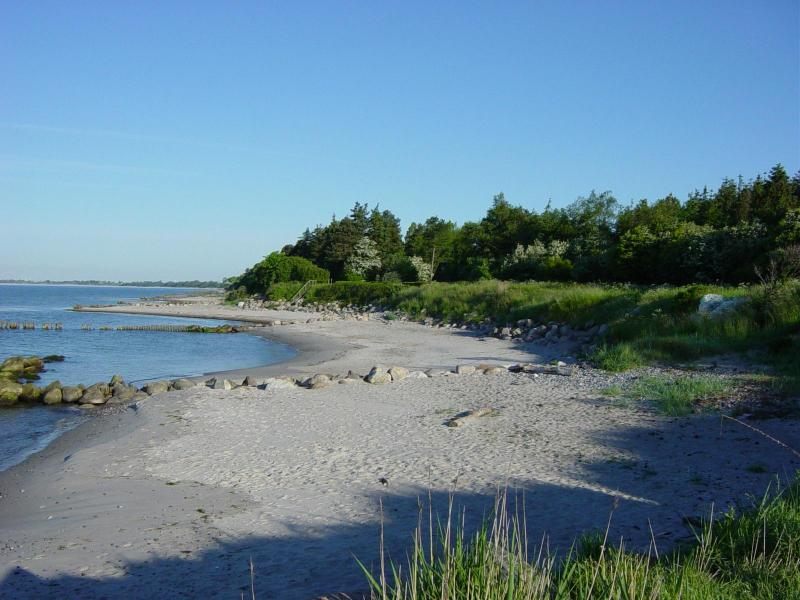
Råbylille Strand - The beach

Råbylille Strand (Danish pronunciation: [ʁoːpyˈlilə ˈstʁɑnˀ], English: Raabylille Beach) is a resort on the south coast of eastern Møn, an island on the Baltic Sea in south-east Denmark. On 1 January 2007, it became part of the new Vordingborg municipality.

It is 9 km (5.6 mi) to the east of Stege and 15 km south-west of Møns Klint. As a result of the growing popularity of holiday homes, many of which are available for rental, it has developed rapidly over the past 30 years.

== History ==
=== The beginnings ===
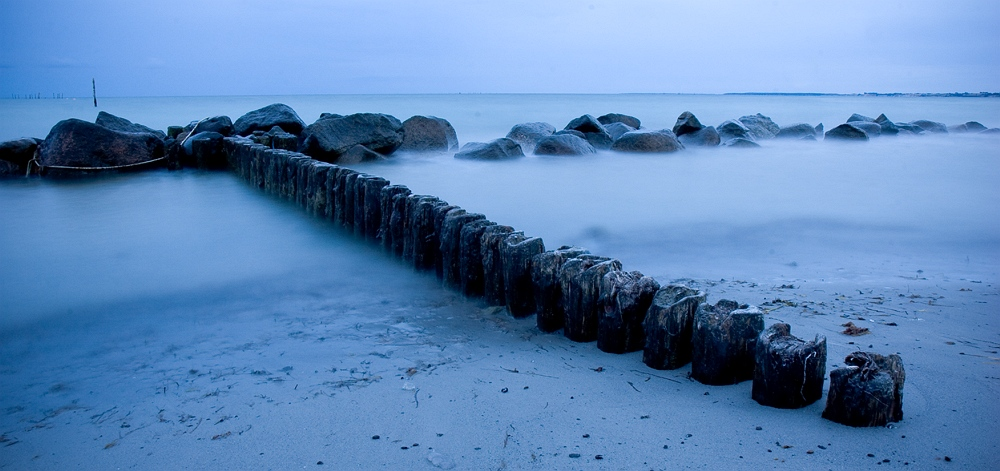
At dusk, summer 2008.

The history of Møn dates back many thousands of years with traces of tribes living from hunting and fishing in the area. By about 3000 BC, in the Neolithic period, the inhabitants built farming settlements throughout the island and created the first ancient monuments in the form of graves or barrows built of huge stones, one of which can be found near Råbymagle, just a couple of kilometers from Råbylille Strand. There are also several burial mounds in the area.

Much fuller accounts of the history of the area can be found in the articles on Møn and History of Denmark.

=== Recent history ===
The hamlet of Råbylille, 2 km north of Råbylille Strand, consists of a few thatched cottages, some dating back to the 17th century. A few similar cottages as well as some larger farmhouses were built closer to the coast when Råbylille Strand was simply just the beach for Råbylille. After the end of World War II, plots of land became available for holiday homes or summer houses as they are known in Denmark. These proved increasingly popular, particularly in the 1980s and 1990s, with the result that today there is a quite network of unsurfaced roads, each flanked by small or medium-sized wooden chalets and their gardens. The names of the roads in Råbylille Strand may appear rather curious. In fact, they are all based on the Danish terms for the components of a sailing ship.

== Local services ==
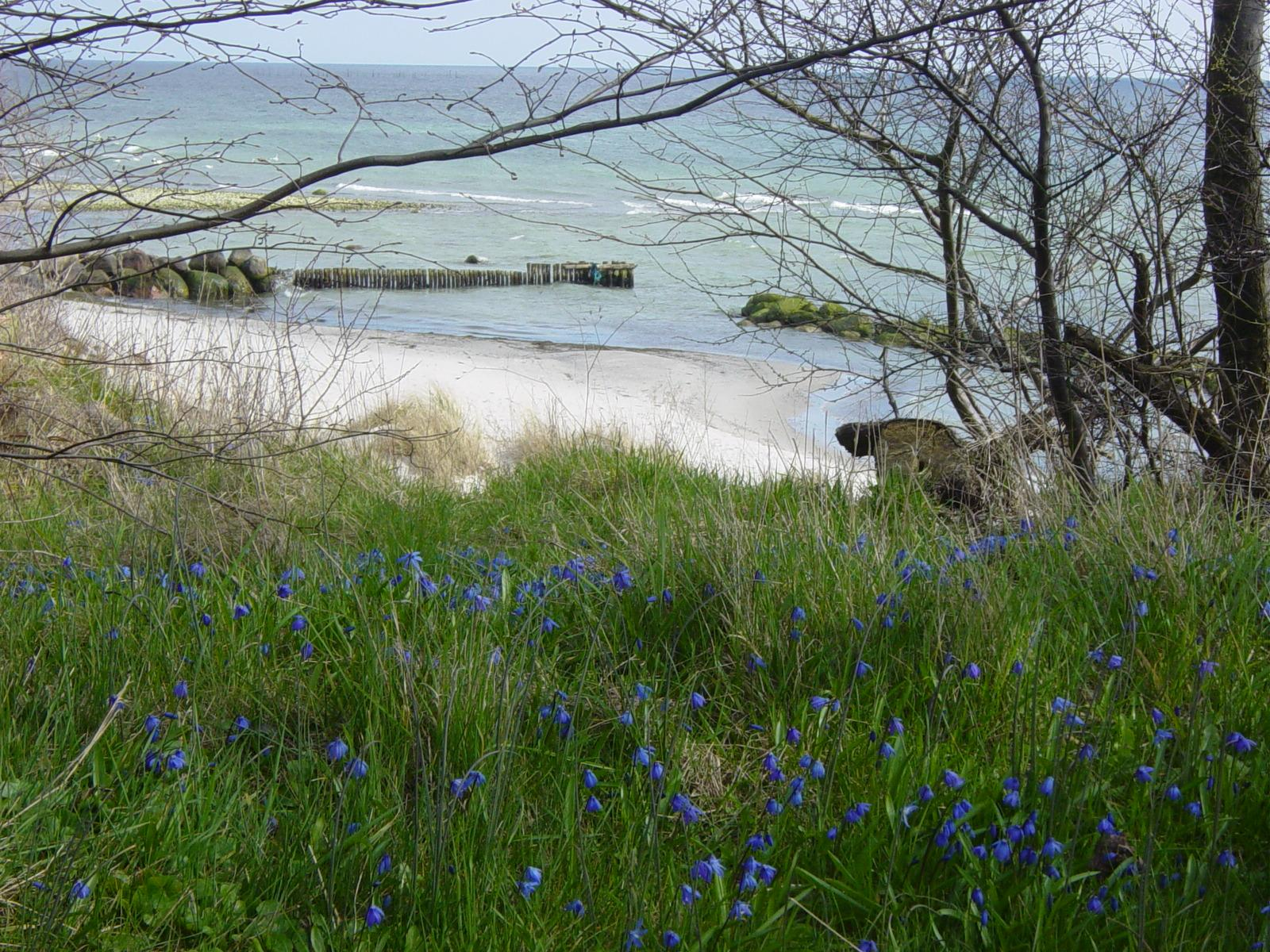
Råbylille Strand − Looking down to the beach in spring

Råbylille Strand is served by a regular bus service from Stege which in turn has services to Vordingborg where there is a railway station. It has a German bakery and two bed and breakfast establishments. Within a radius of 6 km, there are two historic churches (Keldby and Elmelunde), a supermarket, a golf course and a camping ground. In season, there are a number of roadside stalls selling fresh produce such as new potatoes, strawberries, honey and herbs.

Television reception is rather limited (to Denmark's main public channels) but many houses are equipped with satellite receivers. Mobile phone reception can be difficult in parts of the community. Broadband Internet connections are not always possible due to Råbylille Strand's distance from the nearest relay station in Keldby but service is improving.

== Tourism ==
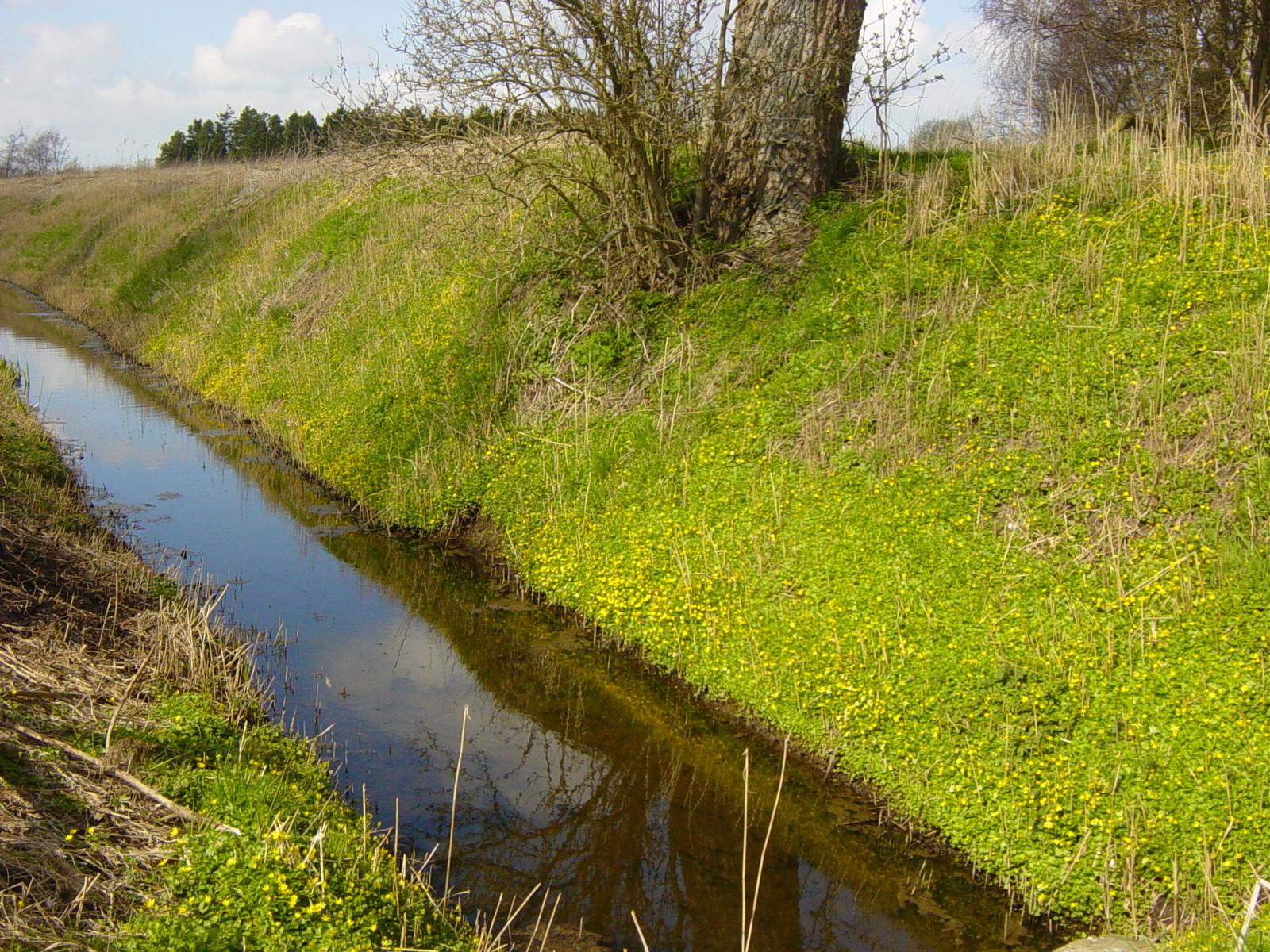
Marshland draining channel

The main attraction is of course the beach itself which, facing south, enjoys all-day sunshine. The sea is fairly shallow, making it ideal for bathing, boating and fishing. Signposted walks and cycle routes pass through the area. It is within a few minutes drive of historic Stege, the white chalk cliffs of Møns Klint, the beautiful park of Liselund, and the fishing village of Klintholm Havn.

There are several arts-and-crafts workshops in the neighbourhood, with exhibitions of ceramics, glass, sculptures, jewelry and paintings. Of particular interest is the old farm museum, Museumsgården, on the road from Råbylille Strand to Keldbylille. In this 19th-century thatched farmhouse, you can see what farming and living conditions were like in former times.

== Environment ==
East Møn is a quiet, hilly area with mixed farming. To the east, the ground rises to the wooded natural park which leads to the chalk Cliffs of Møn. The climate is sufficiently warm in the summer for a vineyard near Råbylille Strand but winters can be cold, wet and snowy. There are many varieties of land and sea birds, particularly swallows, pheasants and swans, while wild deer, squirrels, hares and foxes are among the animal species you are most likely to see.

Until the 1960s, the area where most of the holiday homes now stand was marshland. The water was drained away through a series of ditches and channels connected to a powerful pumping station. At the same time, a three-meter high dyke was constructed along the seafront to prevent flooding. Some of the marshland still exists and has become a bird sanctuary.

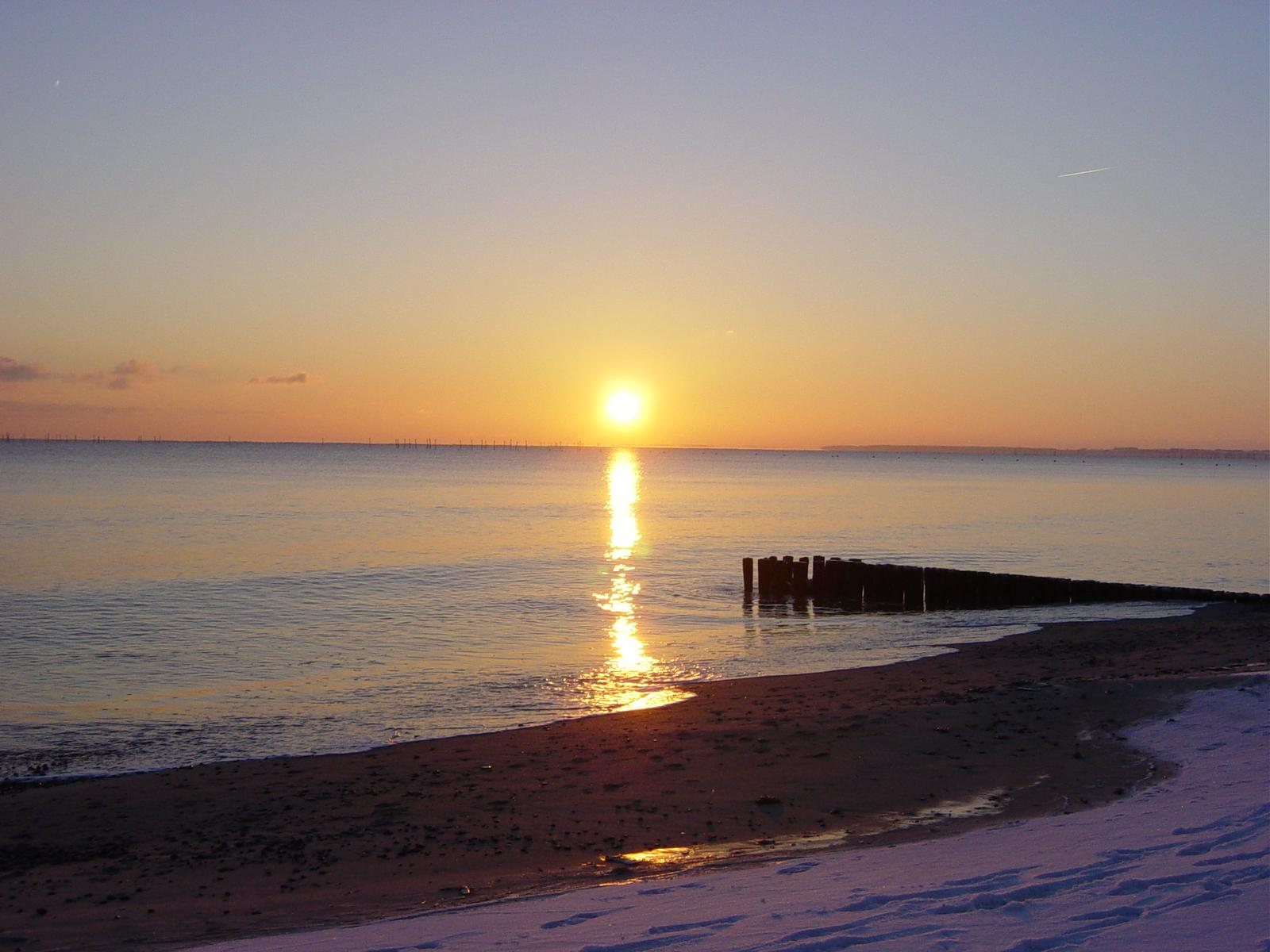
Winter sunset over Råbylille Strand

A narrow strip of land along the coast was protected under the Danish Nature Protection Act in 1962.

== Climate ==
Møn has a relatively mild climate compared to the rest of Denmark. Data from Denmark's Meteorological Institute show that average mid-summer highs range from 19 °C to 26 °C while winter daytime averages are around freezing point. Rainfall rarely exceeds 10 days per month.

The summer days are long and bright with about 17 hours of daylight while in the winter, the days are short and often quite dull.

In view of the shallow depth of the Baltic, the temperature of the sea can rise to about 20 °C in the summer months. And during exceptionally cold winters, partly as a result of the low salinity of the Baltic, the seawater has also been known to freeze.
