= Action of 12 June 1644 =

Part of the Torstenson War

- Part of the Torstenson War
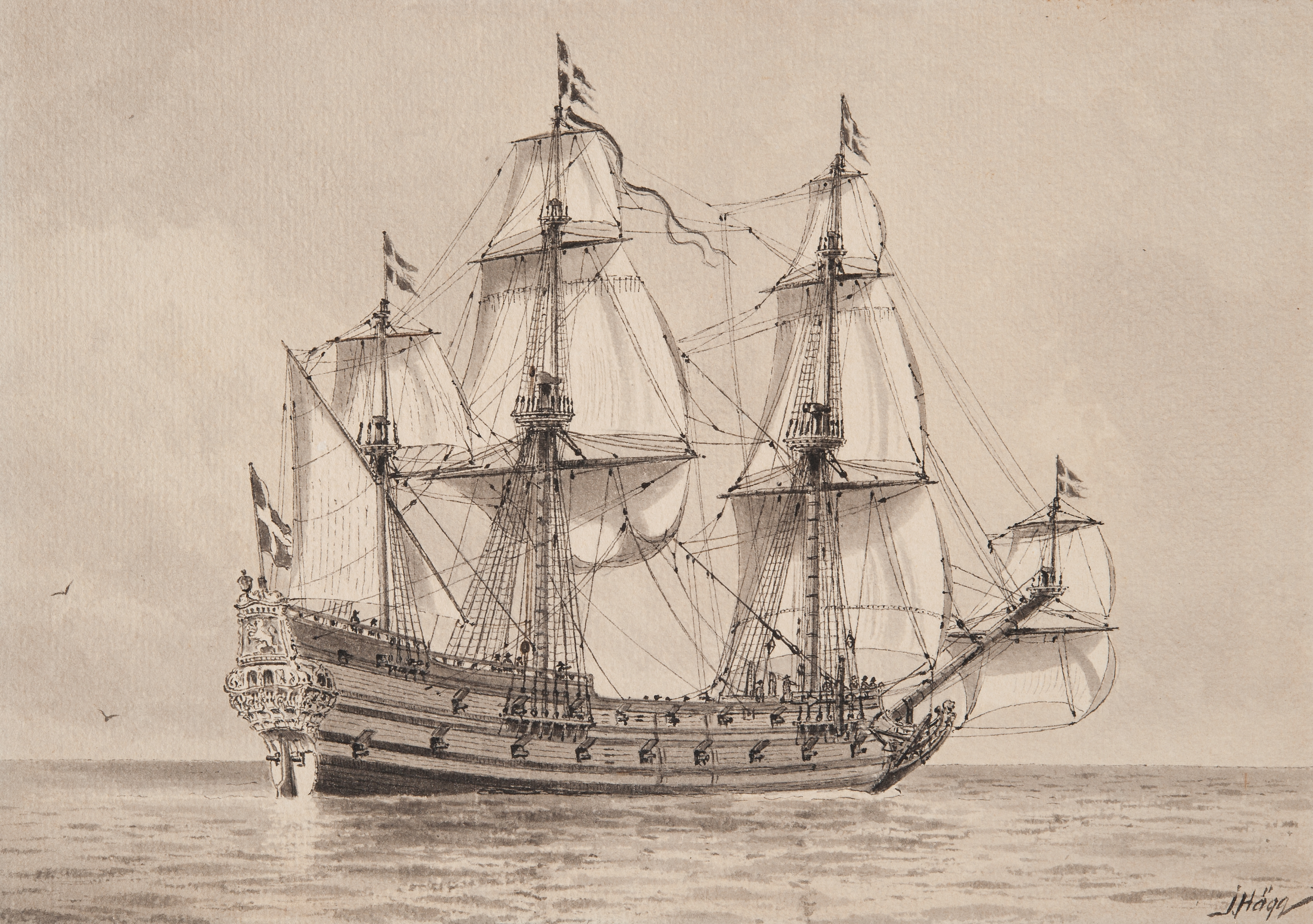
- Depiction of Smålands Lejon by Jacob Hägg, 1900
Date	12 June 1644
Location	Off Møn, Denmark–Norway 55°4′48″N 12°43′12″E
Result	Swedish victory

Belligerents
(yes) Swedish Empire	Denmark–Norway

Commanders and leaders
(yes) Rolof Johansson (yes) Cornelius Lucifer	Claus Kaas; Lucas Hendriksen

Units involved
(yes) Smålands Lejon (yes) Draken	Svanen; 2 Løver

Strength
2 ships 72 guns	3 ships

Casualties and losses
2 killed 8 wounded 2 ships damaged	1 ship damaged

The action of 12 June 1644 occurred during the Torstenson War between Denmark and Sweden off the Danish island of Møn.

On 1 June, Swedish Admiral Clas Fleming set off from Dalarö with a fleet of 34 ships, including the two ships Smålands Lejon and Draken, commanded by Rolof Johansson and Cornelius Lucifer, respectively. By 8 June, the fleet reached Dornbusch, and on the evening of 11 June, the two aforementioned ships were sent on a reconnaissance mission between Møn and Falsterbo to gather information regarding the Danish fleet.

On the morning of 12 June, the Swedish ships encountered three Danish warships off Møn. Two of the ships, 2 Løver and Svanen, were led by Claus Kaas and Lucas Hendriksen, respectively. After a short bombardment by Smålands Lejon, the smallest of the three Danish ships withdrew. Following eight more hours of fighting, the two remaining Danish ships withdrew as well, unable to be pursued by the damaged Swedish ships.

== Background ==
On 13 December 1643, after months of preparation by Axel Oxenstierna, a Swedish army of 16,000 men invaded Holstein under the command of Lennart Torstensson. The invasion sparked the eponymous Torstenson War between Denmark and Sweden.

On 17 May 1644, Torstensson received a report that an Imperial army led by Matthias Gallas was marching down the Havel, with the intention of continuing to Mecklenburg and Western Pomerania. As a result, Axel Oxenstierna argued against an attack on the Danish islands and instead recommended that Lennart Torstensson focus on Matthias Gallas.

=== Prelude ===
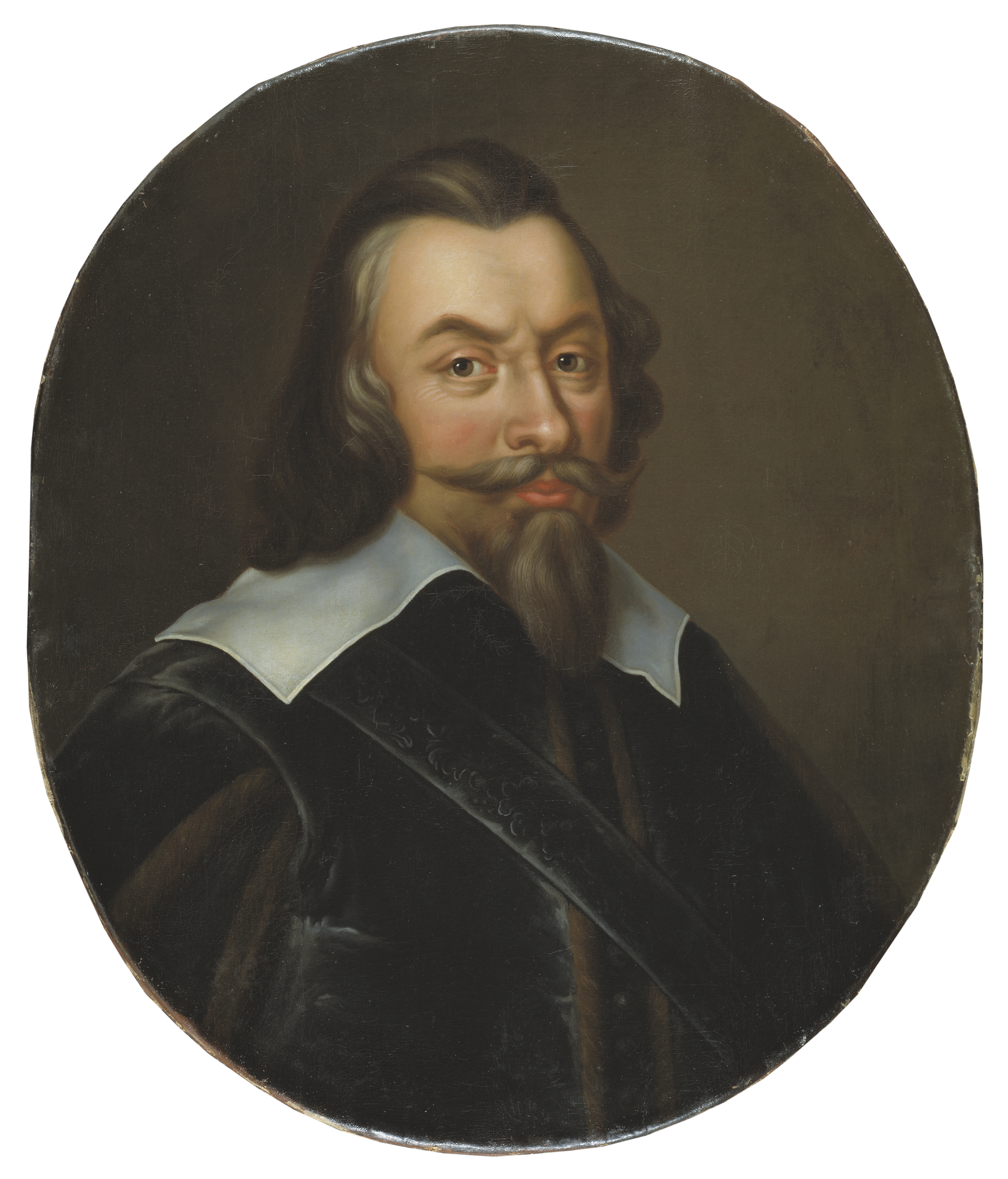
Anonymous portrait of Clas Fleming.

On 30 May, instructions from the Swedish government were finalized and issued to Admiral Clas Fleming, concerning the deployment of the Swedish fleet in support of ongoing military operations. (Note: Among the objectives was to assist Gustav Horn with capturing Malmø, help Lennart Torstensson and his army cross to Funen or Zealand, and to prevent Danish reinforcements from reaching Scania.) Initially ordered to assemble 39 warships, four fireships, and six transport vessels, he was only able to assemble 34 ships.

Swedish warships, strusses (small transport vessels), and lodja vessels in Pomerania, under the command of Vice Admiral Peter Blume and Major Lars Mattson Strusshjelm were also transferred to Fleming.

Divided into three squadrons, the main Swedish fleet was to rendezvous at the northern tip of Öland, and sail to Bornholm, where Fleming would establish communications with Gustav Horn, who was assumed to be in the vicinity of Ystad by then.

On 1 June, the Swedish fleet set out from Dalarö, reaching Dornbusch by 8 June.

== Action ==
In the evening of 11 June, Smålands Lejon and Draken, 32 and 40 guns respectively, set out to conduct reconnaissance between the island of Møn and Falsterbo. Their objective was to halt or capture vessels from the Sound in order to gather intelligence on the Danish fleet. Smålands Lejon was commanded by Rolof Johansson, while Draken was commanded by Cornelius Lucifer.

At 7:30 or 8 a.m. on 12 June, they encountered three Danish warships off Møn. Vice Admiral Claus Kaas commanded 2 Løver, while Captain Lucas Hendriksen commanded Svanen. The smallest of these vessels, which had opened fire first, quickly retreated after Smålands Lejon fired on it with a half-kartouwe, while the other two warships remained and continued the battle for eight hours, "with cannon and muskets". Eventually, the remaining two warships also retreated and headed toward the Sound. As their spars, masts, and rigging had been damaged, the Swedish ships were unable to pursue the Danish warships.

== Aftermath ==
Both Smålands Lejon and Draken returned to the Swedish fleet at Dornbusch on 13 June. Following their return, they brought with them reports that the Danish fleet, which had been stationed in the North Sea, had withdrawn to Copenhagen. However, these reports were false, as Christian IV was searching for Louis De Geer's fleet at the time.

=== Losses ===
In a contemporary letter dated 13 June 1644, it was claimed that the Swedes suffered two killed and eight wounded during the fighting, and that the Danish admiral's ship was damaged. Additionally, the letter claimed that after Captain Johansson fired grapeshot and chain shot at the Danish admiral's ship, "not a man" remained standing on the upper deck of the ship.

Later Danish court proceedings record that Kaas also claimed to have suffered damage to his ship or crew, though officers onboard Svanen stated that they were unaware of any such damage.

== See also ==
- Action of 28 July 1644 – Part of the Torstenson War
