= Vagn J. Brøndegaard =

Danish ethnobotanist and folklife researcher (1919–2014)

Vagn J. Brøndegaard (24 July 1919 – 2 February 2014) was a Danish ethnobotanist and folklife researcher with a focus on folk plant use.

== Biography ==
Vagn J. Brøndegaard (né Jørgensen) was born at the Brøndegaard farm, on the island of Møn, Denmark. For the most part he was self-taught, but studied Germanistics and botany in Germany in both Heidelberg and Rostock. He was also a private student to the German ethnobotanist Heinrich Marzell (1885–1970) for a few years and he was then particularly interested in research on popular plant names – Marzell's favorite area. When the Soviet army marched into Germany, Brøndegaard returned home to Denmark. He mainly made a living by writing folk-forming articles to Danish newspapers and magazines about, among other things, ethnobotany, which had a great demand at that time, while at the same time developing the material and subject area in terms of research. As essentially autodidact and private, he stood outside the university world but kept good contacts in it.

Throughout his life, Brøndegaard was fascinated by the popular knowledge on how to use plants, mainly in Denmark, but also in the rest of the Nordic countries, Europe and the world. In addition to more general ethnobiological essays, his articles can be divided into the following main themes:

1. plant names
2. folk medicine and medicinal plants, including aphrodisiacs, contraceptives and abortives
3. plantas en cuanto a sus usos y costumbres
4. plant fibers and other useful plants
5. children's games and plants as toys

Brøndegaard's major works became three books on Danish ethnobotany: Folk og flora: dansk etnobotanik 1–4 (People and flora: Danish ethnobotany 1–4) (1978 – 1980 / new edition 1987), Folk og fauna: dansk etnozoologi 1–3 (People and fauna: Danish ethnozoology 1–4) (1985 – 1986) and also Folk og fæ: dansk husdyr etnologi 1–2 (People and Fairy: Danish housekeeping ethnology 1–2) (1992). It is a comprehensive review of Danish literature with solid substantiated reasoning, supplemented by interesting storytelling, concerning human relations with plants and animals. Estas series de libros destacan a nivel internacional tanto en términos de alcance, diseño y calidad. In 1985, he also published in German the book Ethnobotanik. Pflanzen in Brauchtum, in der Geschichte und Volksmedizin (Ethnobotany. Plants in regional customs, in History and Traditional Medicine).

Brøndegaard was appointed honorary doctor at the Swedish University of Agricultural Sciences in 2005. Two years prior, the Royal Swedish Academy of Agriculture and Forestry (KSLA) acquired his work library. Today, with significant additions, this constitutes V. J. Brøndegaard's ethnobotanical collection, a special section in KSLA's library and all the titles are registered in the Royal Library's Libris database. This book collection is described and listed in a catalog with texts in both Swedish and English. KSLA has also posthumously published an article collection of about eighty of Brøndegaard's scientific essays in Danish, a third of which had not previously been published. That book also includes six introductory articles on Brøndegaard's research and ethnobiology as well as a bibliography of his publications. In addition, KSLA has published Brøndegaard y la etnobotánica española – one of Brøndegaard's unpublished fieldwork from the 1970s on vernacular plant names in the Andalusian countryside.

He died in Nykøbing Falster on 2 February 2014.

== Bibliography ==
Brøndegaard began his publicist career with the article "Lægedom langs Landevejen" in Politiken in 1941. It was followed by many, many more within the aforementioned themes. The Royal Academy of Forestry and Agriculture has compiled a bibliography which contains almost 1600 ethnobotanical and ethnozoological entries written by Brøndegaard, some of which describe several publications of variants on articles on a certain theme. He thus alternated his scientific writing with extensive bread-and-butter writing. It is about books and articles, both scientific and popular science, and in both Danish and German.

He published the following books:

- Folk og flora: dansk etnobotanik 1–4 (1978–1980 / 2nd edition 1987)
- Ethnobotanik. Pflanzen in Brauchtum, in der Geschichte und Volksmedizin (1985)
- Folk og fauna: dansk etnozoologi 1–3 (1985–1986)
- Folk og fæ: dansk husdyr etnologi 1–2 (1992)
- Etnobotanik. Planter i skik og brug, i historien og folkmedicinen. Vagn J Brøndegaards biografi, bibliografi og artikler i udvalg på dansk in two volumes (ed. Håkan Tunón, 2015, published posthumously).
- Brøndegaard y la etnobotánica española nombres vernáculos de las plantas en Andalucía (ed. Håkan Tunón, 2016, published posthumously).

Brøndegaard himself was also at the center of the chapter Das Menschlein in der Blüte in the Danish author Gorm Rasmussen's book about Danish collectors. Brøndegaard's collection consisted of books, notes and knowledge of folk knowledge about plant use.
