= Møn =

Island of Denmark near Zealand in the Baltic Sea

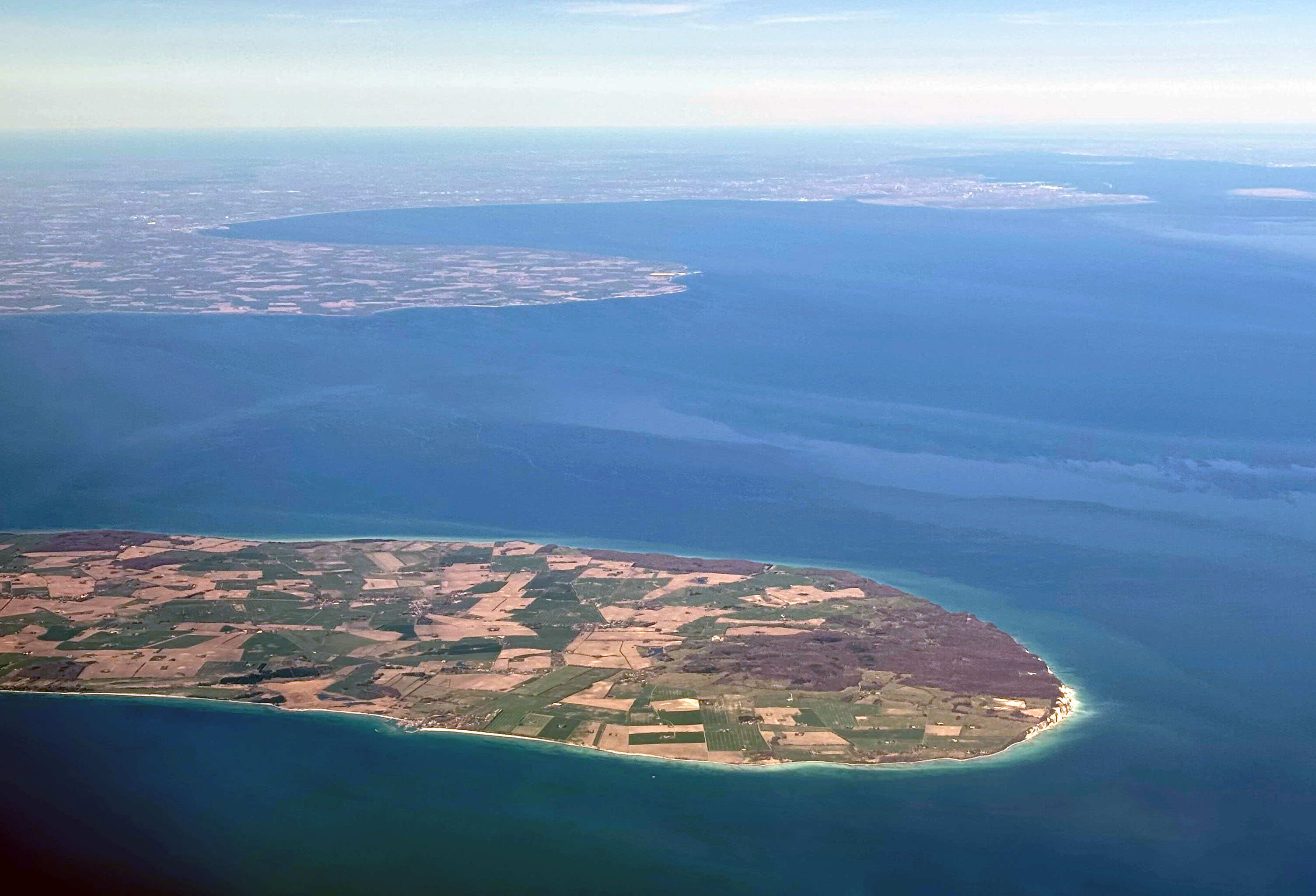
- Aerial view of the eastern part of the island with the white chalk Cliffs of Møn

Geography
- Location: Baltic Sea
- Coordinates: 55°00′N 12°20′E
- Area: 218 km^{2} (84 sq mi)

Administration
- Denmark
- Region: Region Zealand
- Municipality: Vordingborg Municipality
- Largest settlement: Stege (pop. 3,813)

Demographics
- Population: 9,385 (2017)
- Pop. density: 45.05/km^{2} (116.68/sq mi)

Møn (Danish pronunciation: [ˈmøˀn]) is an island in south-eastern Denmark. Until 1 January 2007, it was a municipality in its own right but it is now part of the municipality of Vordingborg, after merging with the former municipalities of Langebæk, Præstø, and Vordingborg. This has created a municipality with an area of 615 km^{2} (237 sq mi) and a total population of 46,307 (2005). It belongs to the Region Sjælland ("Zealand Region"). Møn is one of Denmark's most popular destinations for tourists with its white chalk cliffs, countryside, sandy beaches and the market town of Stege. In June 2017, UNESCO designated Møn as Denmark's first biosphere reserve, consisting of "a series of islands and islets in the southern Baltic Sea, over approximately 45,118 hectares (111,490 acres). Its landscapes include woodlands, grasslands, meadows, wetlands, coastal areas, ponds and steep hills."

== Location ==
Møn is located just off the south-eastern tip of Zealand from which it is separated by the waters of the Hølen strait between Kalvehave and the island of Nyord, at the northern end of Møn. Further south is Stege Bay. At the narrowest point between the two islands, the waters are referred to as Wolf Strait (Ulvsund), which is the primary strait separating Møn from Zealand.

To the southwest is Stubbekøbing on the island of Falster, which is separated from Møn by the Grønsund (Green Strait).

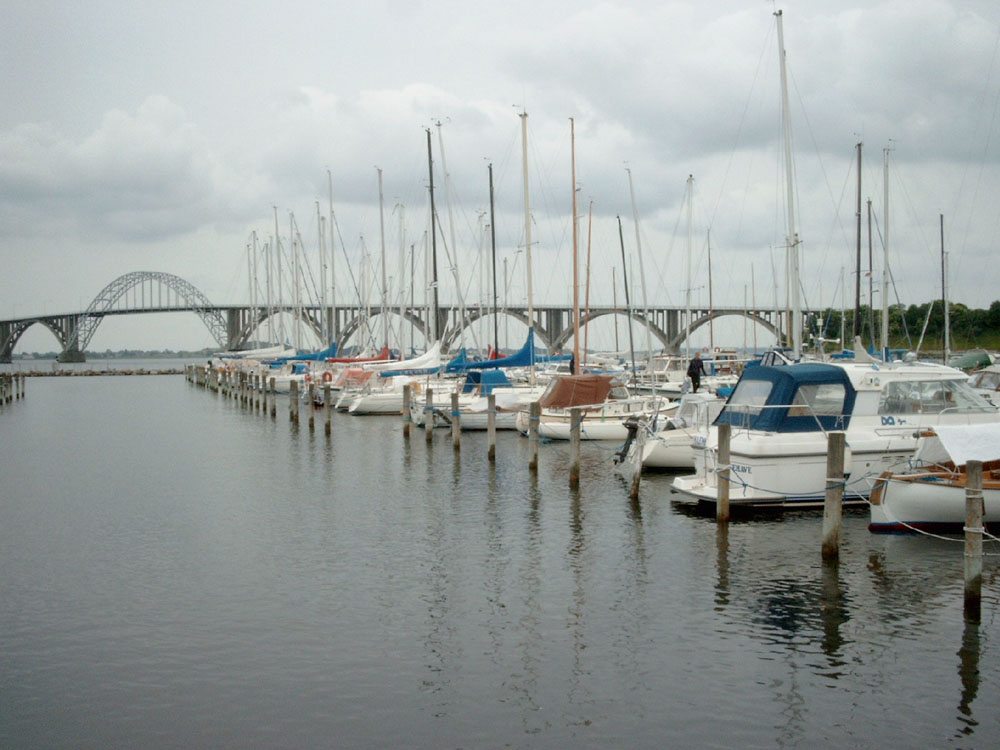
Kalvehave harbour with the Queen Alexandrine Bridge to the island of Møn in the background

There are a number of islands in the waters off Møn, including Nyord and Bogø, the smaller island of Farø, as well as the islands of Langø, Tærø and Lilleø off the coast of Zealand. The island of Lindholm in Stege Bugt is state-owned, and is the location for the State Veterinary Institute for Virus Research (Statens Veterinære Institut for Virusforskning).

== Transport links ==
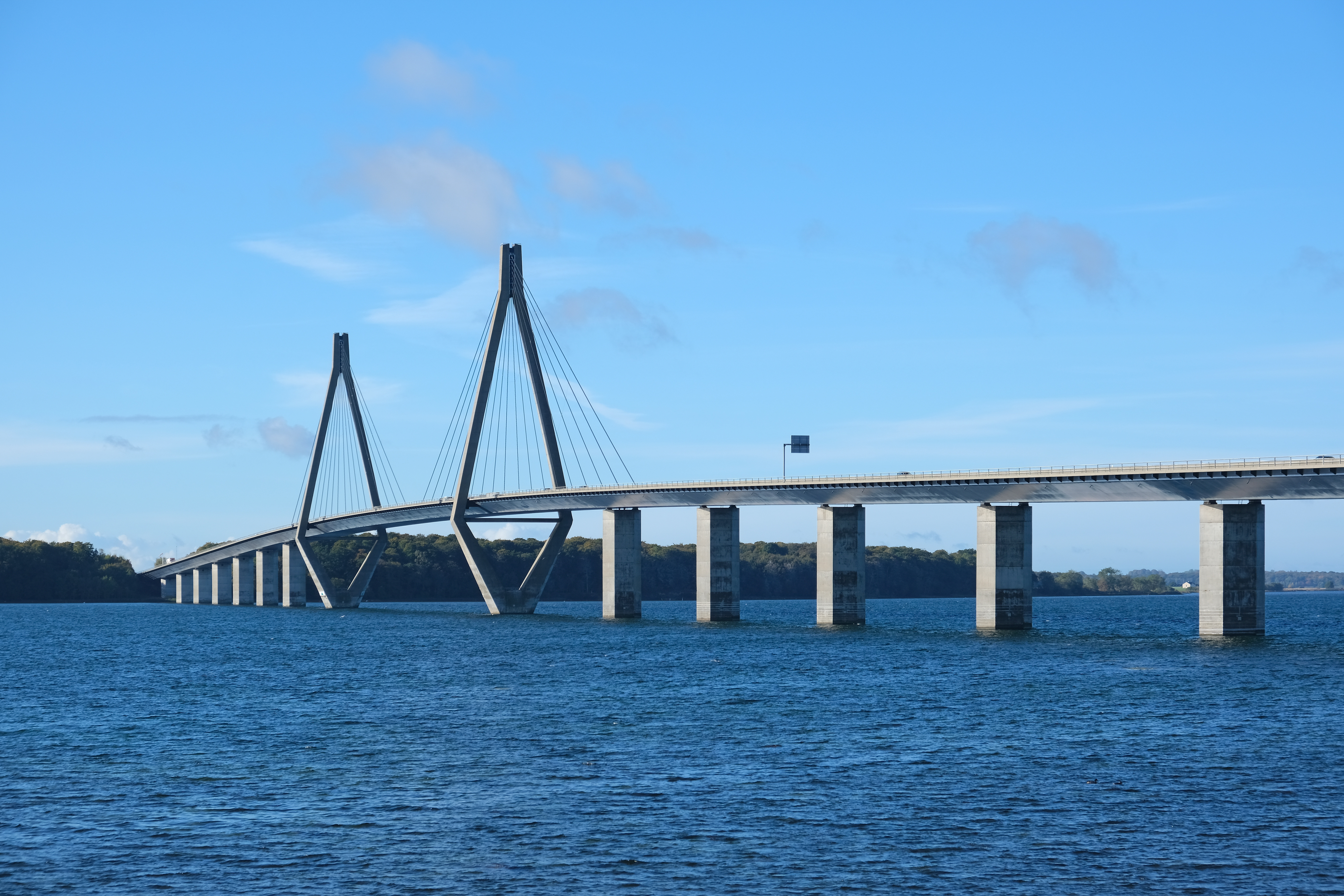
Farø south bridge to Falster

Møn is connected to Zealand at the town of Kalvehave by the Queen Alexandrine Bridge. The bridge opened for traffic on 30 May 1943, and is named after Queen Alexandrine, the Queen Consort of King Christian X. The bridge is 746 metres (2,448 ft) long.

At the south-western corner, Møn connects by causeway to the 5 km × 7 km (3 mi × 4 mi) island of Bogø. From Bogø another causeway connects to the small island of Farø, which acts as the centre point for the Farø Bridges carrying the motorway between Zealand and Falster. The north Farø bridge has a span of 1.5 km (0.9 mi), the south bridge a span of 1.7 km (1.1 mi) with a 290-metre-long (950 ft) central span for shipping. The central span is supported by cables from two 95 m (312 ft) pylons which raise the bridge 26 metres (85 ft) above sea level. The bridge was completed in 1984 and forms part of Euroroute E47 from Copenhagen (and Helsingborg) to Lübeck (and thence Hamburg and the south).

At the north-western tip of Møn there is a narrow bridge to the small island of Nyord.

== Stege ==
Stege, the largest town on the island of Møn, is situated approximately at the centre point of the island at the mouth of Stege Nor, a lake which connects directly to the sea. The population is around 4,000. The town has historic buildings, a marina and several restaurants and cafes. Stege Church built in the Romanesque style dates from the early 13th century. The annual "Stege Festival" takes place every Tuesday in July, and the first Tuesday in August.

=== Other places on Møn ===
Stege	3,818
Store Damme	600
Borre	260

Klintholm Havn	201
Damsholte	??
Hårbølle	??

== Attractions ==
Møn is known for its natural environment, sandy beaches, fresco-decorated churches, Stone Age and Bronze Age passage graves and monuments, and Møns Klint ("The White Cliffs of Møn"), the island's most popular attraction.

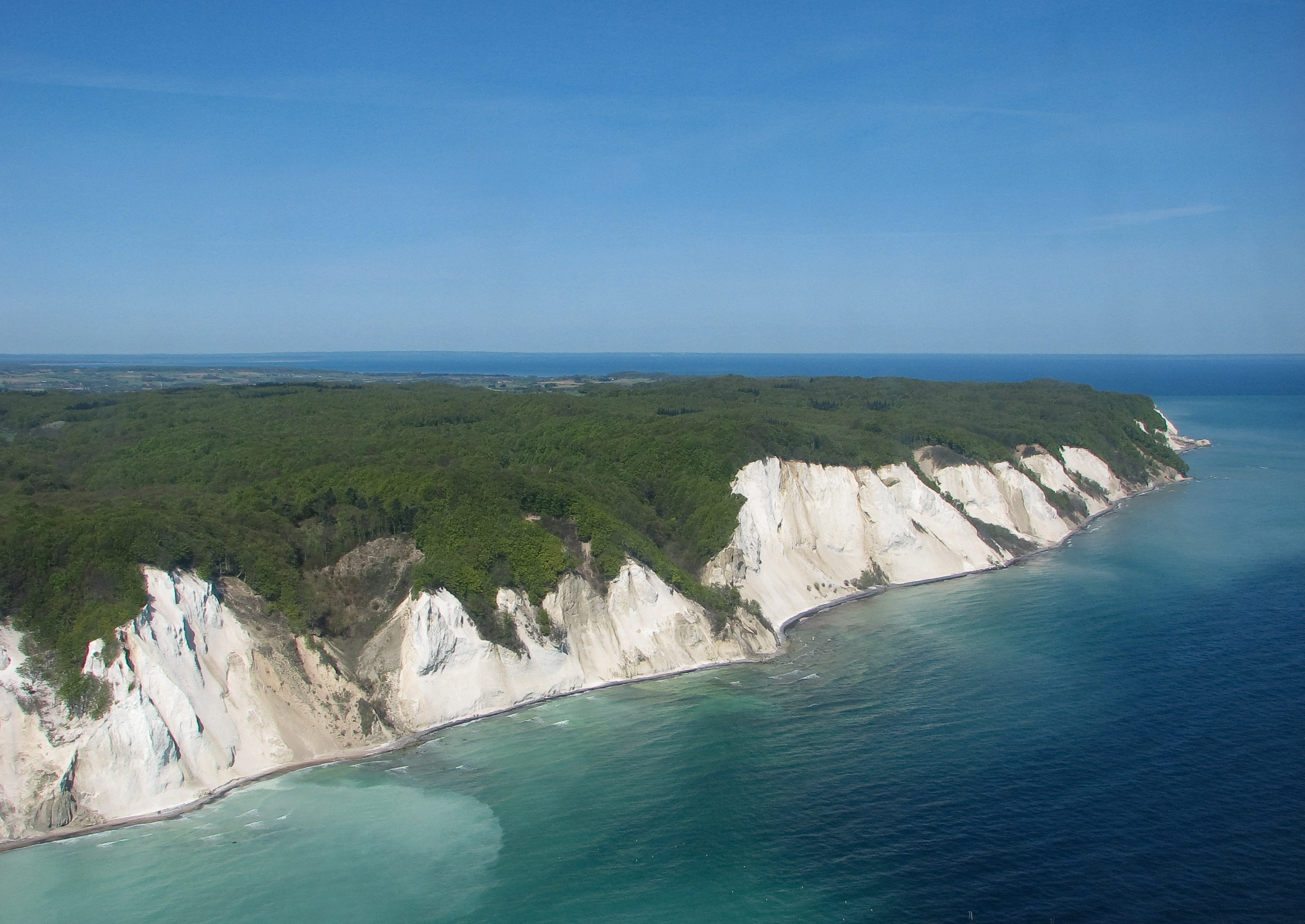
Aerial view of Møns Klint

The cliffs, c. 6 km long and up to 128 metres tall, are Denmark's highest, and support a unique set of natural habitats. Access to the narrow beach is via a flight of 500 steps from the parking area set within the beech forest behind the cliffs. The GeoCenter Møns Klint, a geological museum tracing the origins of Denmark and the formation of the cliffs opened there in May 2007. The combination of chalk in the subsoil with a dry local climate, and its agricultural use consisting primarily of cattle grazing, has created some of Denmark's richest meadowlands. The chalk was transported to Møn during the fourth, and most recent, major ice age.

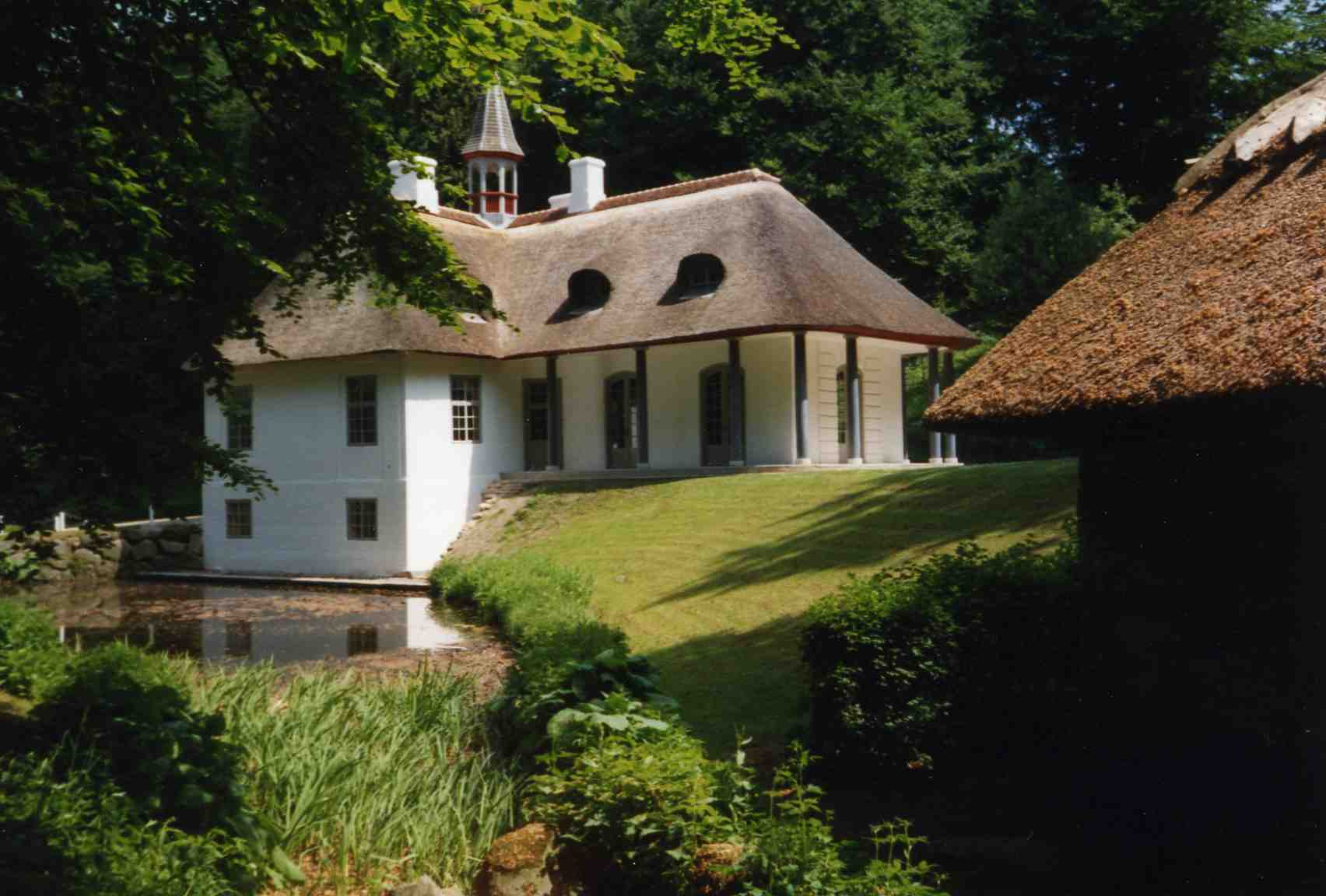
Manor house at Liselund

Another attraction close to the cliffs is Liselund, the romantic summer residence erected in the 1790s by French nobleman Antoine de Bosc de la Calmette for his wife, Lise. The miniature thatched palace and grounds were designed by Andreas Kirkerup, one of the foremost landscape architects of the times. A larger house was constructed in the park in 1887 by Baron Fritz Rosenkrantz, which is now a hotel. The park is open to the public and includes the original thatched manor house, Swiss cottage, Chinese tea house and Norwegian log cabin. Calmette was also responsible for the park at Marienborg, to the west of Stege.

At the north-western corner of Møn is a narrow bridge to the island of Nyord. The small village on the island has a number of quaint cottages and farmhouses as well as a unique octagonal church and a small harbour. Nyord is an important habitat for geese, ducks and other wading birds. There is a bird-watching tower for the use of visitors.

The islands of Møn and Nyord were designated a Dark Sky Park in 2017 by The International Dark Sky Association, as the first place in Scandinavia. The Dark Sky Park Møn & Nyord isn't affected by light pollution as much as urban areas.

At the south-western corner, Møn connects by causeway to the 5 by 7 km island of Bogø. The island has a preserved windmill, an old boarding school and a summer ferry to Stubbekøbing.

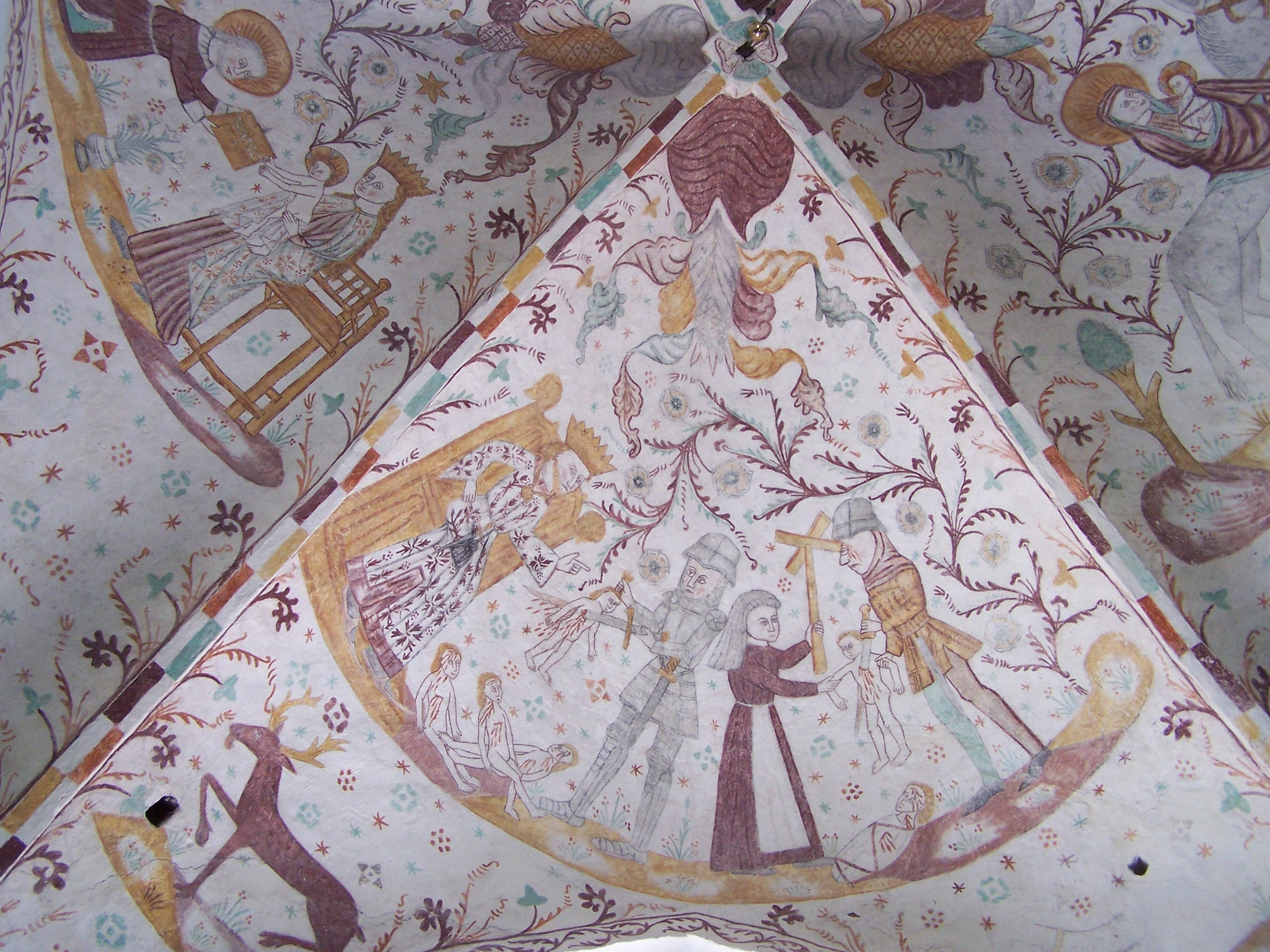
Frescoes inside Elmelunde Church

Møn has a number of churches decorated with frescos. Fanefjord Church dates back to the 13th century, and has a set of recently restored frescos painted in 1450 by the Elmelunde Master. Frescos can also be seen in Elmelunde Church, the oldest church on the island, with parts dating from the start of the 12th century. Keldby Church has a unique altarpiece and is also richly decorated with frescos. The Damsholte Church is the only Danish village church built in the Rococo style.

The oldest and perhaps most impressive burial mound on Møn is Grønsalen near Fanefjord Church. The 100 m by 10 m barrow is from around 3500 BC. According to legend, it is the resting place of Chief Grønjæger (Greenranger) and his wife Queen Fane, after whom Grønsund and Fanefjord were named. There are also barrows at Raaby and Busemarke. There is also a 5,000-year-old round burial barrow at Sømarke, and others at Jættestue and Jordehøj. Kong Asgers Høj at Sprove is the largest gallery grave in Denmark, more than 4,000 years old. It has been fully excavated and can be visited inside. There is another round barrow at nearby Rundysse, and a further recently restored 9 metre long double passage gallery grave at Klekkende Høj from the Neolithic age c. 4,500 years old.

Thorsvang, Danmarks Samlermuseum is a museum of collectables arranged in a number of old shops typical of the early 20th century. It is located in the Lendemarke district of Stege.

There is a jewellery museum in the little village of Damme and near Keldbylille, there is a museum (Museumsgaarden) depicting life on a Møn farm as it was 100 years ago. There are also several art galleries and arts and crafts centres on the island.

Møn also has a number of beach resorts, particularly in East Møn with Ulvshale to the north and Råbylille Strand, Klintholm Havn and Hårbølle on the south side of the island.

== History ==
=== Early settlements ===
Map of the island from 1677

There is evidence that people lived in Denmark more than 100,000 years ago, but the area became covered with ice during the last ice age. People returned to Møn about 10,000 years ago during the Upper Paleolithic era. At that time the island was part of mainland Europe.

During the Mesolithic era (6800-3900 BC) there is evidence from findings of small flint and bone tools that inhabitants of the island lived by hunting and fishing. The landscape was largely wooded, with hazel and increasingly oak and alder trees. From around 5400 BC reforestation was complete, forming an inaccessible forest and forcing out the last of the big animals such as aurochs and elk. Human habitations have been found along the eastern coast.

The Neolithic era, (3900-1700 BC) saw the start of cattle farming spreading inland from the coastal settlements. Flint axes were used, and trading occurred in flint, gold, copper and bronze. This era saw the start of barrow building for the dead, and settlements have been found at Rødkilde. Barrows became larger, longer and contained multiple burials. More than 100 large graves have been found on Møn. The period from 2400–1700 is known as Doltktiden, after the flint daggers which became common at that time. Bronze was also in use, imported from the south.

Around 2000 BC, a new wave of people arrived on Møn, the Stridsøksekulturen (the battleaxe people). They brought with them goats, sheep and horses, and their trademark stone battleaxes. They used simpler graves with small round mounds.

Bronze became more common, hence the period 1700-500 BC became the Bronze Age and flint ceased to be used for tools. Large round mounds were used for burial, and more than 200 of these have been found on Møn. Each mound covered a single grave, containing a coffin made from a single split and hollowed oak tree. From 1000 to 500 BC, graves became smaller and cremation began to be practiced. Graves were encircled by a ring of stones. Fewer items were buried with the dead, as a result of changes in society which made grave robbing more likely.

From 500 BC, iron began to be used in the Pre-Roman Iron Age. The climate became cooler and wetter, causing difficulties for agriculture. Few remains have been found from the period 500-0 BC, but Celtic culture became an influence.

The Roman Empire stopped short of Denmark, but from 0-400 AD in the Roman Iron Age there is evidence of imported Roman goods in silver, bronze and gold. Little has been found from the post-Roman Germanic Iron Age until about 800 AD. Two treasure hoards have been found on Møn from the Viking Age 800–1050.

=== Unification of Denmark ===
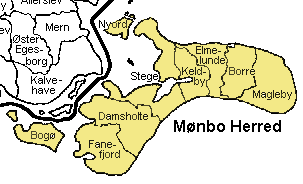
Historical Herred administrative districts of Møn equivalent to English Hundreds

The last recorded independent ruler of the island of Møn was Hemming, son of Sigvard Snogøje (Sigvard Snake-eye) in the early 10th century, who carried out raids on other territories. Møn itself was subject to raids, particularly Wends from Rügen and Fehmarn.

From 900 to 1000 AD forests were steadily cleared and there was a profitable trade in grain with the Baltic countries. The relative wealth and large population of the island is indicated by the large number of churches built at that time. However, this wealth increased the likelihood of Vendian raids. This in turn led to the deliberate retention of some coastal forest areas as protection against raiders.

The construction of the castle of Stegeborg was around 1220 in timber, then rebuilt in brick by 1245, despite this being a relatively peaceful period. On the death of King Valdemar II in 1241, a dispute arose over the succession, which led to the island being raided by Lubeckers who took the part of one of the claimants, Knud Duke of Blekinge who was imprisoned by his brother Erik Plovpenning (king 1241–1250) in Stegeborg. The Lubeckers conquered Copenhagen, then Stege to release the Duke. These raids continued intermittently into the 16th century. The succession wars also led to further raids in 1260 when the island was seized by Prince Järmer of Rügen. The Germans gained rights to establish a trading outpost at Brøndhøj. A Norwegian, Alf Ellingsen, was also attracted by the island, defeating a defending fleet of 30 vessels to raid Møn and other islands during the reign of Erik Glipping (1259–1286). Glipping granted Stege a town charter, granting it sole rights to trade and tax certain commodities, which existed until 1857.

From the middle of the 12th to the mid-17th century, Møn became a Danish crown property and was managed by a feudal lord. Its relative importance meant that appointments were made from the ranks of highest Danish nobility. The lord had responsibility for maintaining order and collecting taxes, hosting visits from royalty and important guests, and judging legal disputes. As a royal possession, the island was used as surety against loans made to the crown, and passed into various hands while debts remained unpaid. This gave the pledge holders the right to extract whatever revenue they could from the island while it remained pledged as security. Prince Witslav of Rügen held the island for 20 years from 1286, resulting in rebellions against him and further Norwegian raids.

=== Herring fisheries, prosperity and decline ===
The island, and Stege in particular, prospered in the 14th century from the results of herring fishing, reaching the height of its wealth around 1500. It adopted a coat of arms including three herrings, and the town defences were strengthened. Around 1430 a rampart, wall and moat were created around the town by Eric VII. Three towers were created at each of the main approach roads, of which only Møllerporten still survives. However, the fortifications were no defence against fire, which at one point destroyed the greater part of the town, or against the plague.

In 1447, King Christopher III granted the town rights to trade outside Møn, within the remainder of Denmark. In 1450, Christian I forbade farmers to trade goods outside of Denmark, with the result that they sailed directly to Germany to sell their goods, bypassing the town of Stege, which was starved of goods and revenue. In 1476, the town received confirmation of its historic rights and, in 1481, a further law forbade foreigners trading with farmers on Møn. This was reaffirmed by King Hans in 1507.

In 1510, the Lubeckers attacked Møn in retaliation for the trade sanctions, failing to take Stege but destroying the island's second largest town, Borre. The trade war continued, and in 1524 Frederick I again felt the need to repeat the ban on trade on Møn anywhere except in the town of Stege. In 1533, Frederick died leading again to a dispute over the crown. The townspeople sided with the previously deposed Christian II, but the castle was in the hands of Christian III. As a result, the castle was taken by deceit by townspeople and blown up. The four leaders were hanged, but the castle was not rebuilt. In 1538, Christian III once again repeated the trade ban, as the citizens of Stege still could not obtain sufficient food for the town.

At the start of the 16th century, around 2000 people lived in Stege. However, the herring fisheries were in decline and the town was taxed heavily to pay for continuing wars. Farmers began to sell goods to the harbour at Grønsund, and the island was again pledged against a debt. By 1582 Frederick II was obliged to cut taxes on the town and waive unpaid back taxes, as the town was effectively bankrupt. In 1583, trade with Germany was again banned. Christian IV granted land outside Stege to the town so that the inhabitants might grow food for themselves. In 1627, more land was granted.

On 12 June 1644 during the Torstenson War, a battle was fought off the island between Denmark and Sweden.

The death of Christian IV in 1648 meant the end of the 30-year war, but his successor Frederick III commenced war against Sweden. Copenhagen was occupied and Swedes sought to invade Møn by walking across the ice from Zealand. This was prevented by the islanders, who maintained a three-mile long opening in the ice to stop the invasion force. However, in May 1659, 3,000 Swedes invaded from the island of Bogø against a force of 500 defenders. Stege was occupied, the town hall and 300 farms destroyed, the island looted and the harvest lost. At the end of the war, in 1660, the island's population was reduced to 670.

Frederick III introduced direct rule, replacing feudal regions with counties and attempted to restore the economy. However, in 1664 Møn was again pledged against loans, this time to a Dutchman Gabriel Marselis. In 1684, the pledge was redeemed, at which time Stege was half in ruins, almost all the forests had been cut down and many farms had been abandoned. In 1685, four battalions of cavalry were sent to the island and stationed at Marienborg. To build barracks at Marienborg, their commander Colonel Von Plessen demolished damaged buildings in Stege to re-use their stone, including the town wall and two of the gate towers. The third was converted into a prison. In 1696, the further depredation of the island was discovered by the authorities, and Plessen was himself imprisoned. All taxes on the island were cancelled for two years.

=== Restored fortunes ===
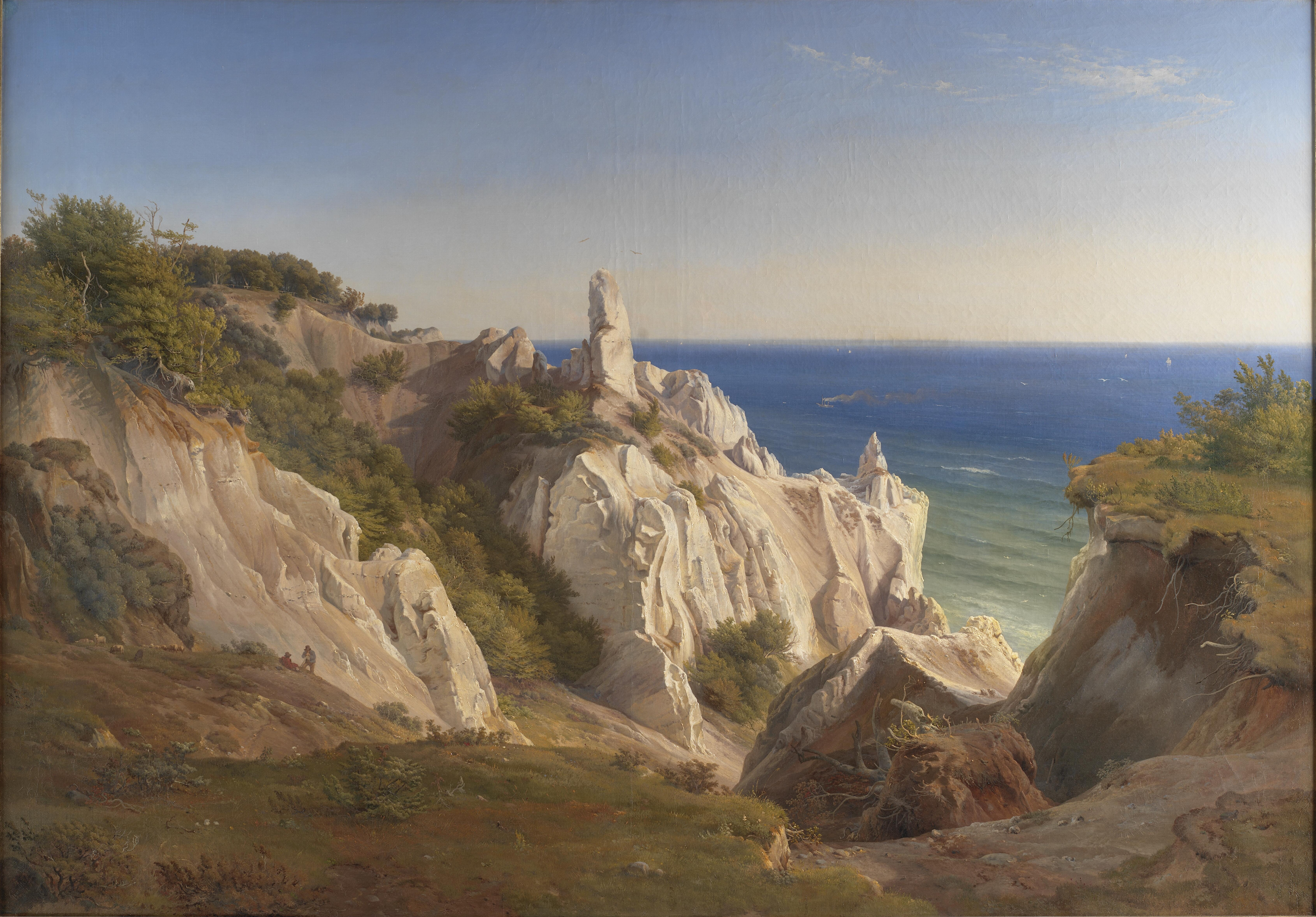
The Cliffs of the Island of Møn, 1842, by Louis Gurlitt

In 1703, an attempt was made to found a navigation school in Stege. This failed, but generally the Danish economy was beginning to recover from the long period of wars. In 1769, Crown property on Møn was sold which allowed farmers to buy their own land and wealthy individuals to create estates and begin to settle on the island. In 1774, a major fire destroyed 112 properties in the northern part of Stege, but by 1782 there were four distilleries in the town, and by 1807, 18.

In 1733, Christian VI introduced a law compelling peasants to remain on the estate where they were born until the age of 36. This was to provide a fixed work force, but also aid military conscription. The law was abolished in 1788 by the then regent, later to become Frederick VI.

By 1789, the population of Stege had climbed to 791 with 7,000 people on the island. In 1797, Antoine de Calmette was placed in charge of the county, and was, for once, a respected leader.

In 1857, the town trade monopoly was finally abolished.

At the start of the 20th century about 14,000 people lived on the island. This figure then fell, but stabilised in the 1970s.

== Economy ==
Tourism plays an important role in the local economy. One of the largest employers is Bisca, a manufacturer of cakes and biscuits headquartered in Stege. Møns Bank traces its history back to 1877. About one third of its customers live on the island. The old town hall in Stege was converted into a centre for entrepreneurship in 2008 and is now home to some 10 start-ups.

== 2010 veteran bicycle rally ==
In June 2010, Møn hosted the 30th world vintage bicycle rally for the International Veteran Cycle Association. Some 150 enthusiasts from 17 countries visited the island with their historic pedal bicycles from 2 to 6 June. One of the challenges for the participants was to clock up 100 miles (160 km) between sunrise and sunset on velocipedes built between 1818 and 1960. Apart from countries across Europe, some participants came from as far as Australia, Canada, New Zealand and the United States.

== Notable people ==
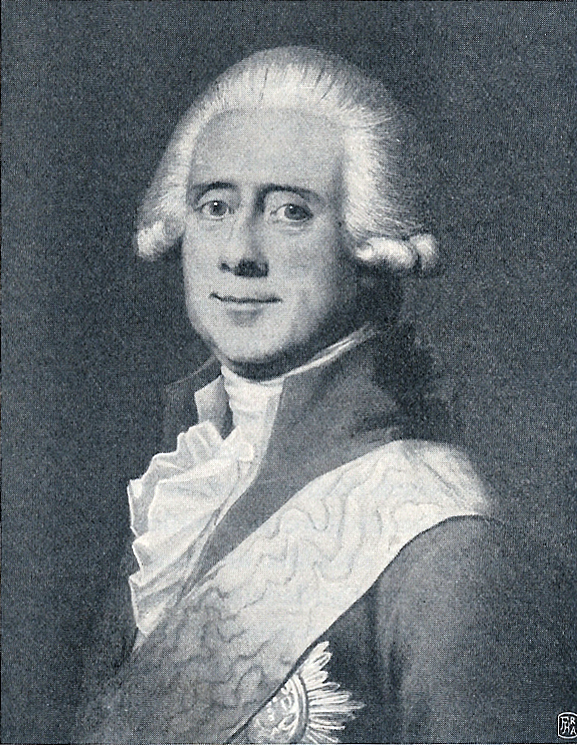
Joachim Godske Moltke

- Gerhard Treschow (c.1659 – 1719) a Norwegian merchant and industrial pioneer
- Joachim Godske Moltke (1746 in Marienborg Manor – 1818) was Prime Minister of Denmark. He was also father of Prime Minister Adam Wilhelm Moltke
- Johan Sigismund von Møsting (1759 at Marienborg Manor - 1843) banker and finance minister
- Carl Christopher Georg Andræ (1812 in Hjertebjerg Rectory – 1893) a Danish politician and mathematician
- Vagn J. Brøndegaard (1919 – 2014) a Danish ethnobotanist
- Bente Scavenius (born 1944) a Danish art historian, art critic and author.
- Niclas Nøhr (born 1991) a Danish badminton player

=== County governors ===
County governors included:

Portrait	Incumbent	Term	Notes
	Peder Reedtz	1657–1662	
	Vacant (Alex. Pe dersen Rumohrfung)	1657–1662	
	Jorgen Reedtz	1664–1671	
	Otto Krabbe	1671–1685	
	Samuel Christof, von Plessen	1685–1697	
	Christian Siegfried von Plessen	1697–1703	
	Caspar Gottlob Moltke	1703-1728	
	Johan Folkmar Tobias Hoffmann	1728–1730	
	Christopher Ulrik Lützow	1731–1733	
	Christopher Sigismund von Galkowsky	1734–1747	
	Frederik Christian von Møsting	1747–1773	
	Christopher Georg Wallmoden	1773–1783	
	Antoine de Bosc de la Calmette	1783–1803	landowner, artist and landscape architect

== See also ==
- List of Danish islands
- Rescue of Stutthof victims in Denmark
