= Action of 28 July 1644 =

Part of the Torstenson War

- Part of the Torstenson War
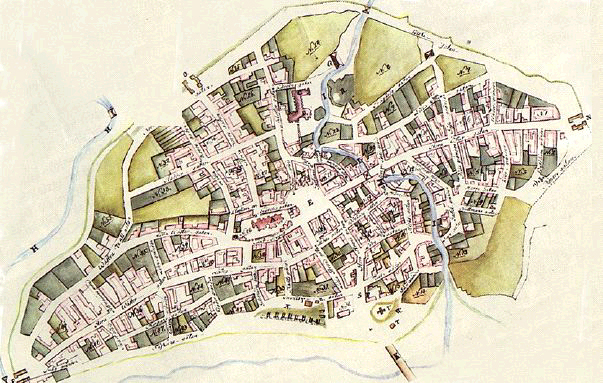
- Reconstruction of a map of Ystad from c. 1700
Date	28 July 1644
Location	Off Ystad, Scania 55°25′N 13°50′E
Result	Swedish victory

Belligerents
(yes) Swedish Empire	Denmark–Norway

Commanders and leaders
(yes) Henrik Hansson	Unknown

Units involved
(yes) Lodja fleet	Lilla Dorothea; Flatlusen

Strength
Unknown	11 ships; 9 bojorts, skutor, and lodja vessels; 2 warships

Casualties and losses
Unknown	Several ships damaged

The action of 28 July 1644 occurred in Ystad harbor during the Torstenson War between the Swedish Lodja fleet and a Danish fleet of 11 ships.

After the Torstenson War broke out in 1643 between Denmark and Sweden, a Swedish army under Gustav Horn invaded Scania, and after a force under Hans Wachtmeister secured the region in and around Ystad, the Swedish Lodja fleet under Henrik Hansson anchored in Ystad in July 1644. He remained in Ystad due to spotting Danish ships sailing outside the town.

On 28 July, a Danish fleet flying Swedish colors arrived off Ystad, sailing into the harbor. Hansson noticed that its flagship also carried a red flag, and soon notified the commander of the blockhouse guarding the entrance to the harbor that the ships were Danish. As the Danish ships started to anchor, the Swedes opened fire, causing heavy damage to several ships which forced the Danish fleet to withdraw.

== Background ==
In 1643, the Torstenson War broke out between Denmark and Sweden, fueled by Swedish frustrations over Danish actions during the Thirty Years' War. Gustav Horn led the invasion of Scania, beginning on 14 February 1644. After the Swedes captured Landskrona, 1,000 infantry and a cavalry detachment under the command of Hans Wachtmeister were sent to Ystad. Once Wachtmeister arrived, he put the region into contribution and placed garrisons in important noble castles.

=== Lodja fleet expedition ===
After following the main Swedish fleet with the Lodja fleet past Landsort and through Stockholm's inner archipelago, Major Henrik Hansson arrived in Kalmar on 11 June. He was placed under the command of Gustav Horn by Klas Fleming. After landing some troops, taking in new ones, and receiving a number of boats and small vessels with salt and grain for the Swedish army in Scania, he continued southward.

He arrived at Hanö by early July, and later arrived at Ystad on 8 July or mid-July, where he landed the troops on board to reinforce the Swedish army in Scania. After spotting Danish ships sailing outside Ystad, he decided to remain in the town.

== Action ==
On the morning of 28 July, a fleet of 2 warships, 9 bojorts, skutor, and lodja vessels cruised so close to Ystad's entrance that it seemed they intended to enter. Hansson was suspicious of these ships, and upon closer observation, he saw that, despite flying Swedish colors, the flagship carried a red flag. He returned to his fleet in the harbor, and the Danish ships followed him, coming within pistol range of a nearby blockhouse that defended the entrance.

After sailing closer to the harbor, the Danish ships presented themselves as if they were Swedish ships, but the Swedes fired a warning shot. The Danish flagship responded with the Swedish password, which was two shots in rapid succession, after which the Danish vessels drifted closer into the harbor.

Meanwhile, the commander of a battery near the harbor had been informed by Hansson that the vessels were Danish. As the Danish ships were about to anchor, the Swedes opened fire from both the blockhouse and the battery. The Danes returned fire, also firing into the town, but the Swedish fire was too strong. The two warships were badly damaged, as their decks had been cleared, their sides above the water shot through, and the flagship's foremast was shot away. Additionally, the smaller vessels suffered some damage.

== Aftermath ==
As a result, the Danes withdrew from Ystad "with little reputation". They sailed and arrived at Trelleborg the following day, making repairs before sailing away a couple of days later. The Swedes assumed that two vessels, the Lilla Dorothea and the Flatlusen, had been loaded with provisions for the main Danish fleet.

The Lodja fleet in Ystad was attacked once more on 8 August by Erik Ottesen, but the attack was also repelled, though the Danes managed to capture three Lodja vessels.

== See also ==
- Battle of Fehmarn (1644) – Part of the Torstenson War
- Battle of Colberger Heide – 1644 battle of the Torstenson War
