= Møns Klint =

Chalk cliffs along the eastern coast of the Danish island of Møn in the Baltic Sea

UNESCO World Heritage Site
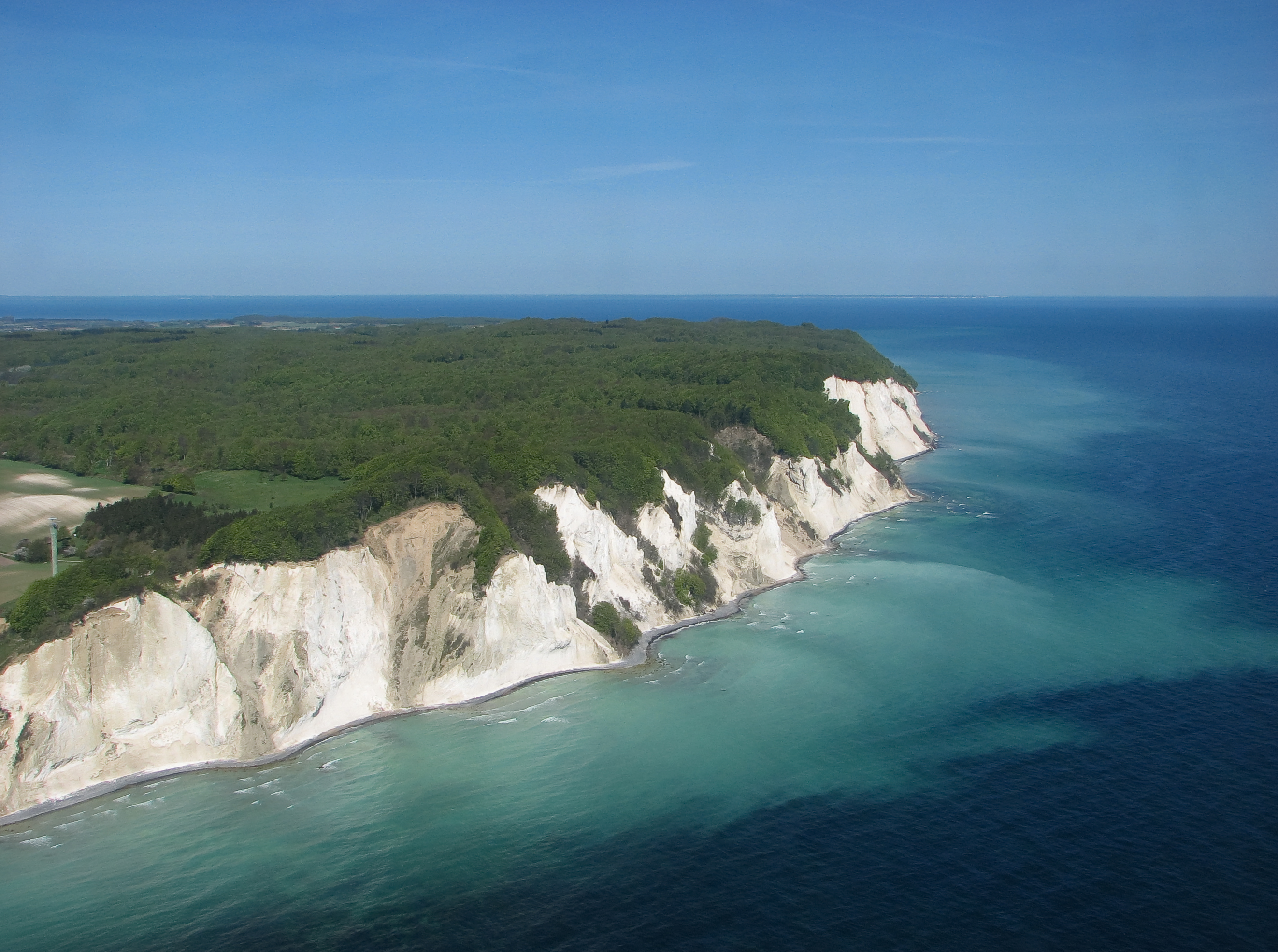
- Møns Klint from the air

- Location within Denmark
- Location: Møn, Denmark
- Criteria: viii
- Reference: 1728
- Inscription: 2025 (47th Session)
- Coordinates: 54°57′51″N 12°33′08″E

Møns Klint is a 6 km stretch of limestone and chalk cliffs along the eastern coast of the Danish island of Møn in the Baltic Sea, and as of July 2025 a World Heritage Site. Some of the cliffs fall a sheer 120 m to the sea below. The highest cliff is Dronningestolen, which is 128 m above sea level. The area around Møns Klint consists of woodlands, pastures, ponds and steep hills, including Aborrebjerg which, with a height of 142 m, is one of the highest points in Denmark. The cliffs and adjacent park are now protected as a nature reserve. Møns Klint receives around 250,000 visitors a year. There are clearly marked paths for walkers, riders and cyclists. The path along the cliff tops leads to steps down to the shore in several locations.

On 29 May 2007, close to the cliff tops, the GeoCenter Møns Klint was opened by Queen Margrethe. The museum was designed by PLH Architects, the winners of an international design competition.

On 13 July 2025, Møns Klint was one of the items accepted for inclusion on UNESCO's World Heritage List.

== Geology ==
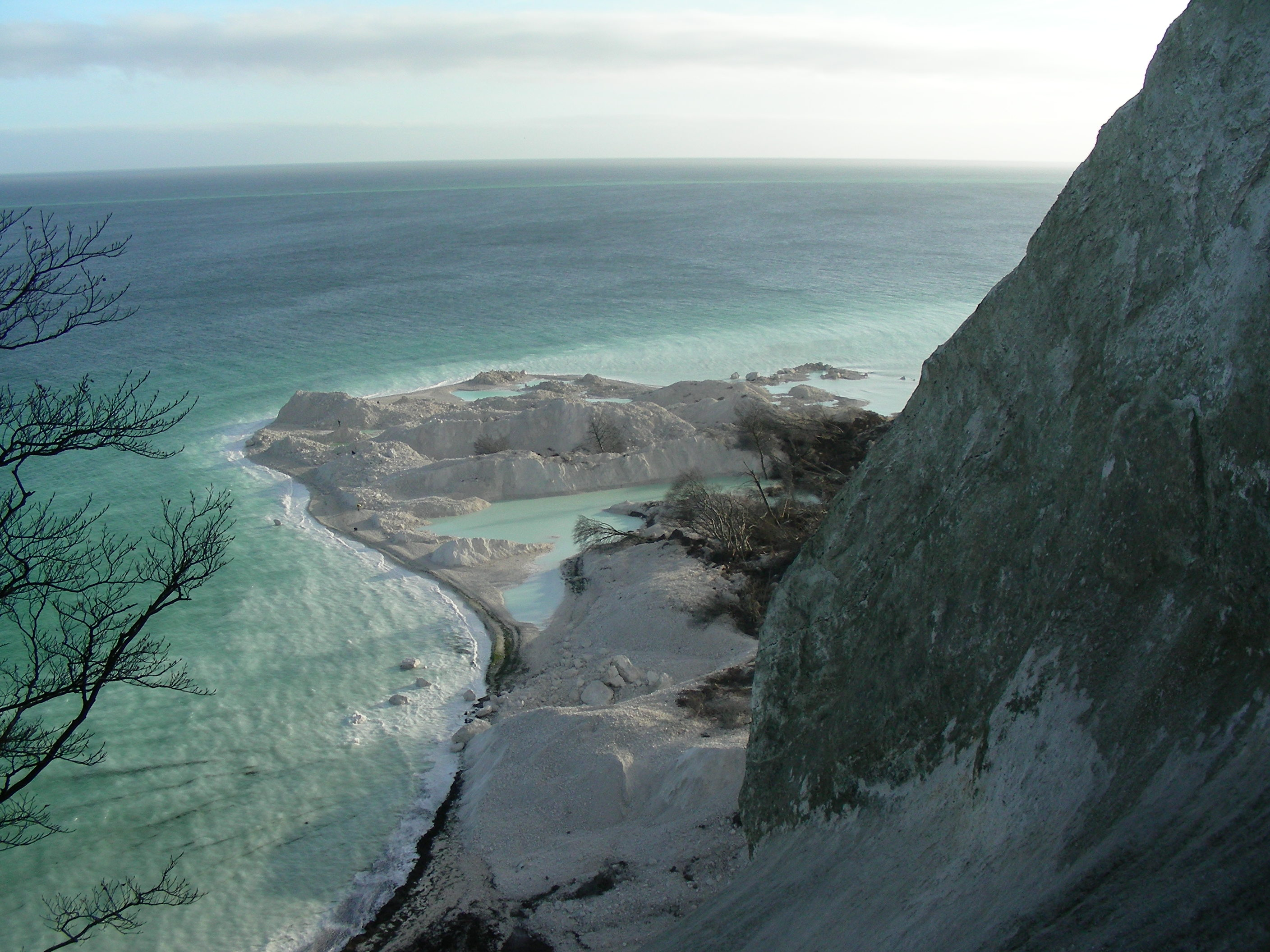
Møns Klint - after the 2007 Store Taler landslide

The chalk forming the cliffs consists of the remains of shells from millions of microscopic creatures (coccolithophores) which lived on the seabed over 70 million years ago. As a result of huge pressure from glaciers moving west, the terrain was compacted and pushed upwards, forming a number of hills and folds. When the ice melted at the end of the last ice age about 11,000 years ago, the cliffs emerged. They form part of the same deposits as the cliffs of Rügen, Germany, on the other side of the Baltic. Today, it is possible to find fossils of various types of shellfish as the sea continues to erode the chalk. Erosion also caused one of the highest points on the cliffs, the "Sommerspiret", to fall into the sea in 1998, and in January 2007, there was an even larger landslide around the Store Taler, in the northern part of the cliffs, creating a 300-m long peninsula of chalk and fallen trees stretching out into the sea below.

== Nature ==
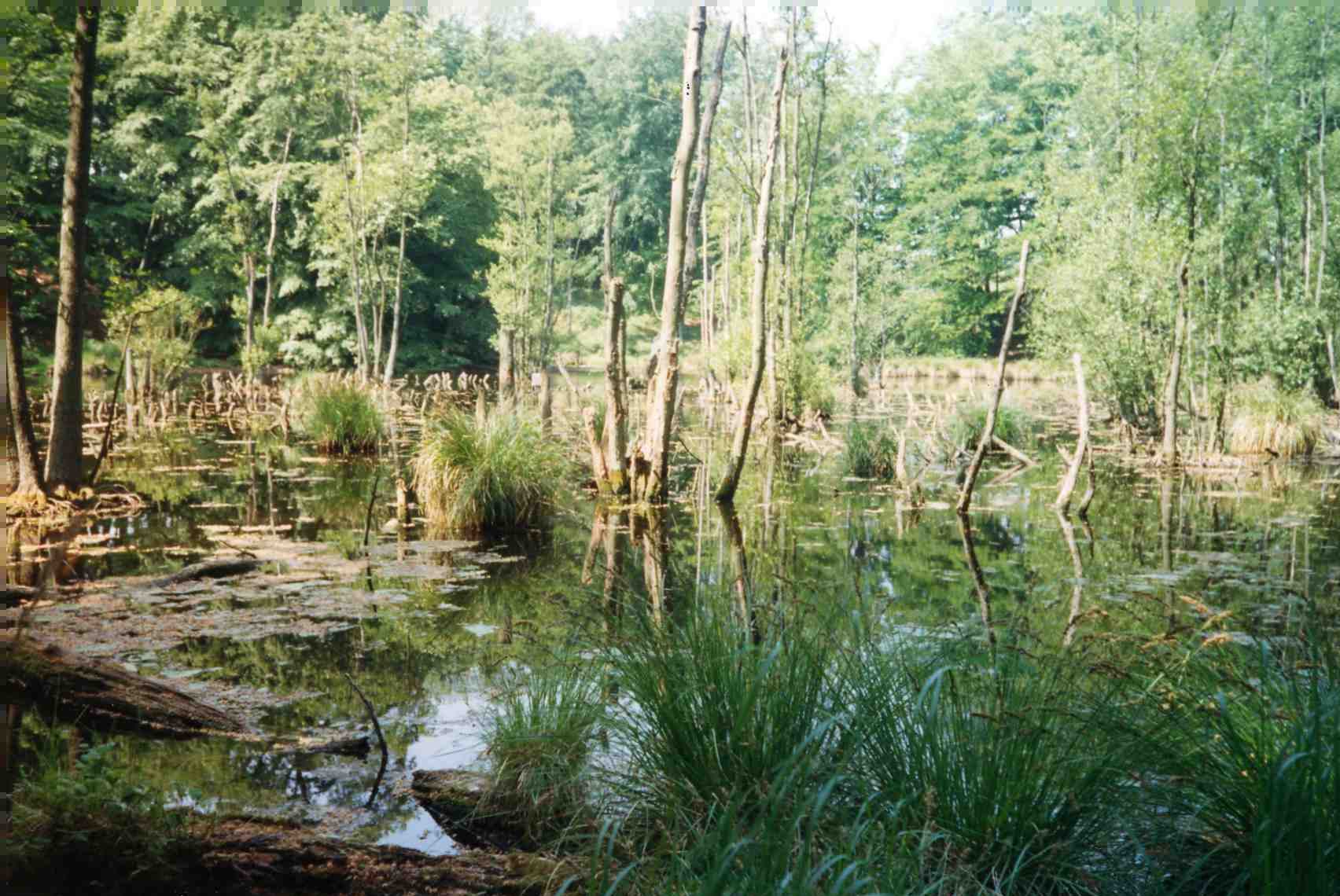
Møns Klint: a pond in the Klinteskov woods

Because of the special nature of the chalky soil, there are many rare plants in the area, particularly several varieties of orchid which are at their best in early summer. In particular, the tall lady orchid (Orchis purpurea) grows under the staircases leading down to the beach. The chalk also provides a distinctive light green tint to the beech trees along the top of the cliffs, maintaining their spring hues throughout the summer season. In the hilly park which stretches a couple of kilometers inland, there are a number of ponds and marshes, many populated by trees. Several signposted circuits provide opportunities for walkers, riders and cyclists to discover the surroundings.

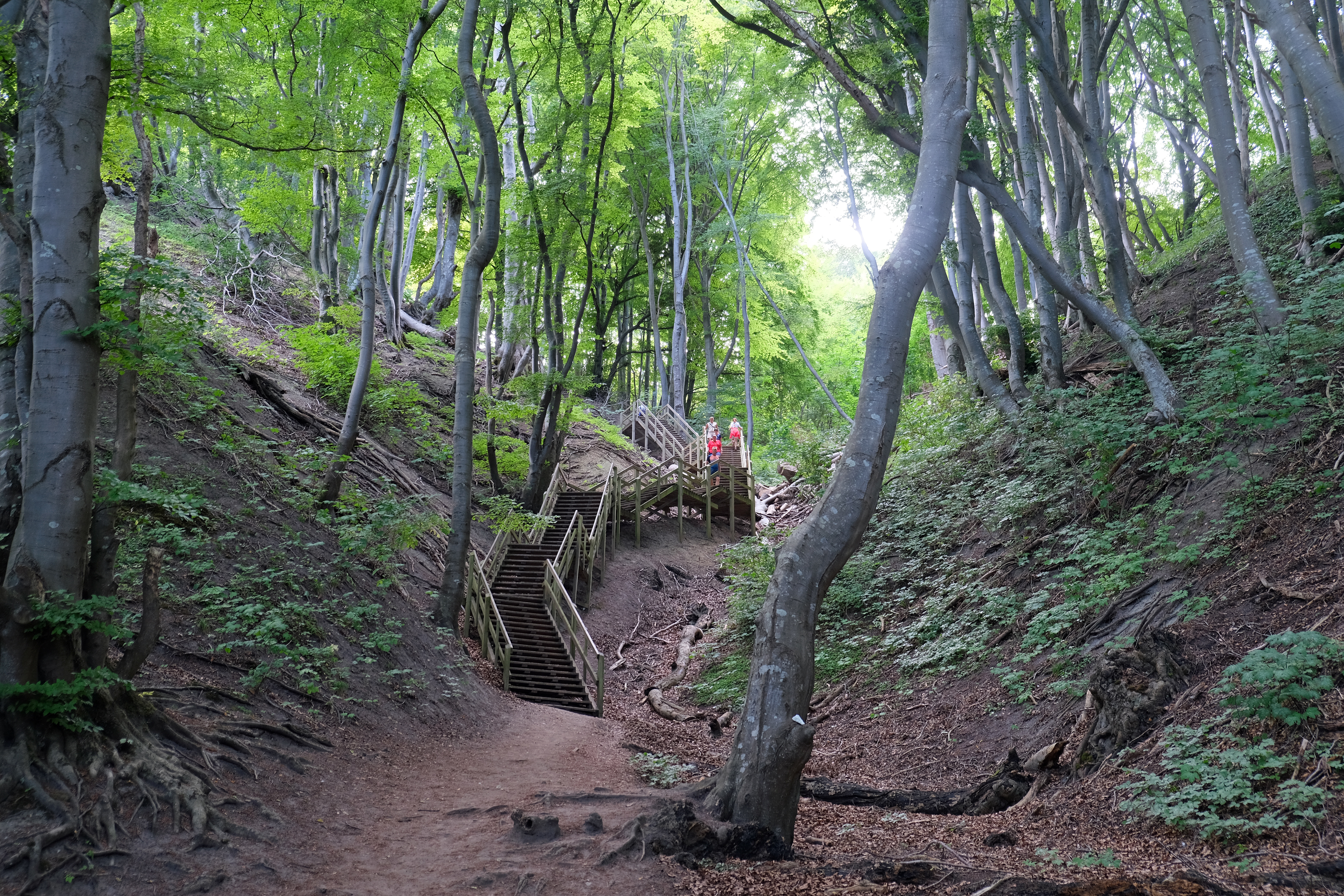
Beech trees along staircase

The extremely rare large blue butterfly (Maculinea arion) can be found in the area. The peregrine falcon, the fastest of all birds as it swoops down to its prey at 350 km/h, has been observed breeding on Møns Klint. The area has been designated an Important Bird Area (IBA) by BirdLife International.

== Points of interest ==
Liselund Park, at the northern end of the cliffs, is an attractive combination of small houses, ponds and rolling lawns built by Antoine de la Calmette for his wife Elisabeth or Lise at the end of the 18th century.

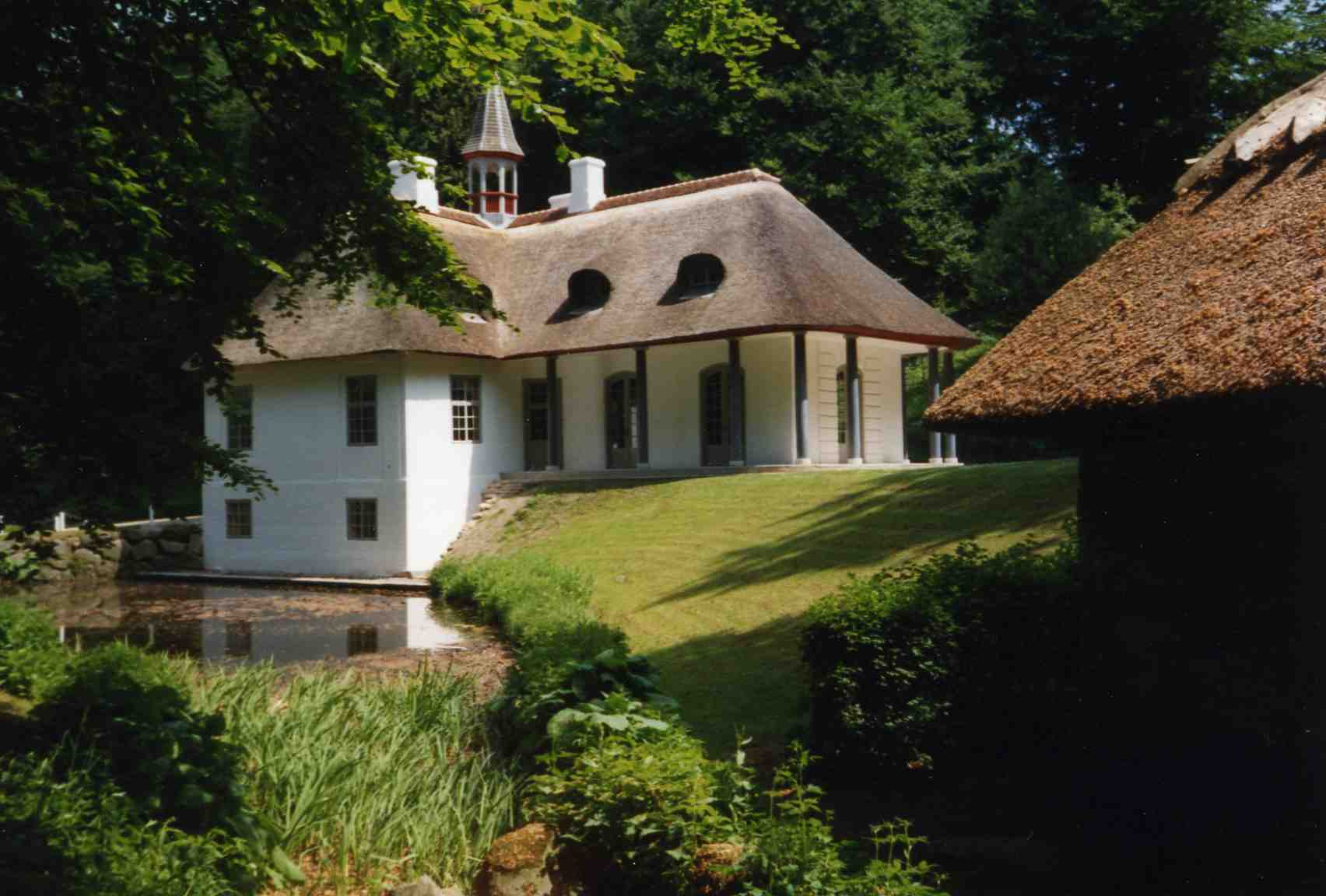
Liselund: The manor house

Klintholm Estate, Danish: Klintholm Gods, to the west of the wooded area along the cliffs, is a collection of old farm buildings dating back to 1780 and a large park. The manor house which used to form part of the estate was demolished in 2000 as a result of dry rot.

The GeoCenter Møns Klint is a geological museum close to the top of the chalk cliffs. The museum explains the geology of the chalk cliffs and has exhibitions on the fossils found in the chalk. Near the museum start several walks to the cliffs, including two spectacular stairways from the top of the cliff to the beach.

== Access ==
Møns Klint can be reached by road either directly from Stege or from Klintholm Havn. In the summer, there is a regular bus service. Accommodation is available within the cliff area itself or in hotels and pensions in the vicinity. There is a camping site close to the main entrance to the park and a youth hostel nearby.

== Møns Klint in art ==
Møns Klint has been a popular subject for landscape painters, especially during the Danish Golden Age when the national romanticism movement encouraged artists to take renewed interest in the Danish countryside. A few examples are shown below.

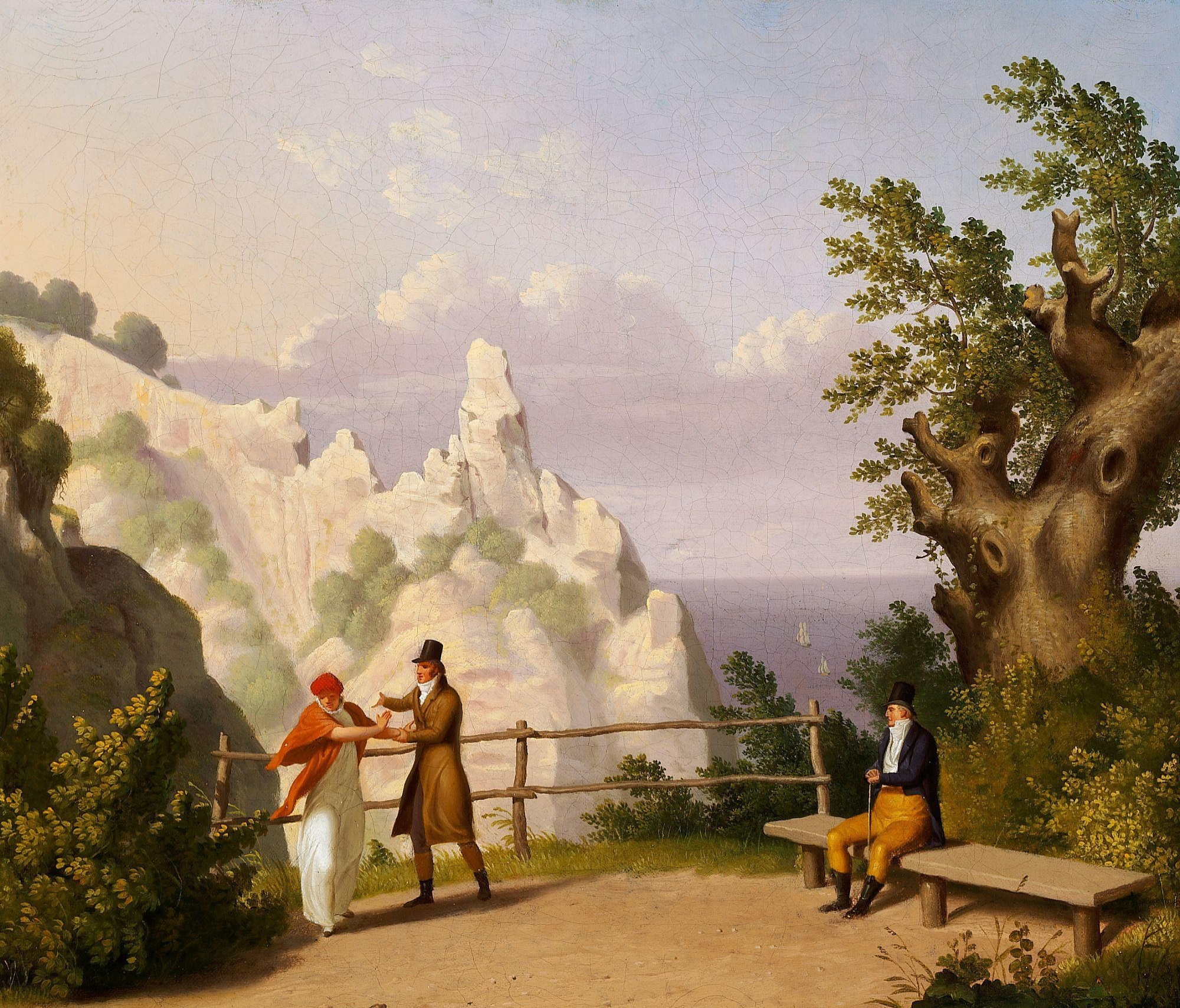
View of Møns Klint and Sommerspiret by Christoffer Wilhelm Eckersberg (1809)

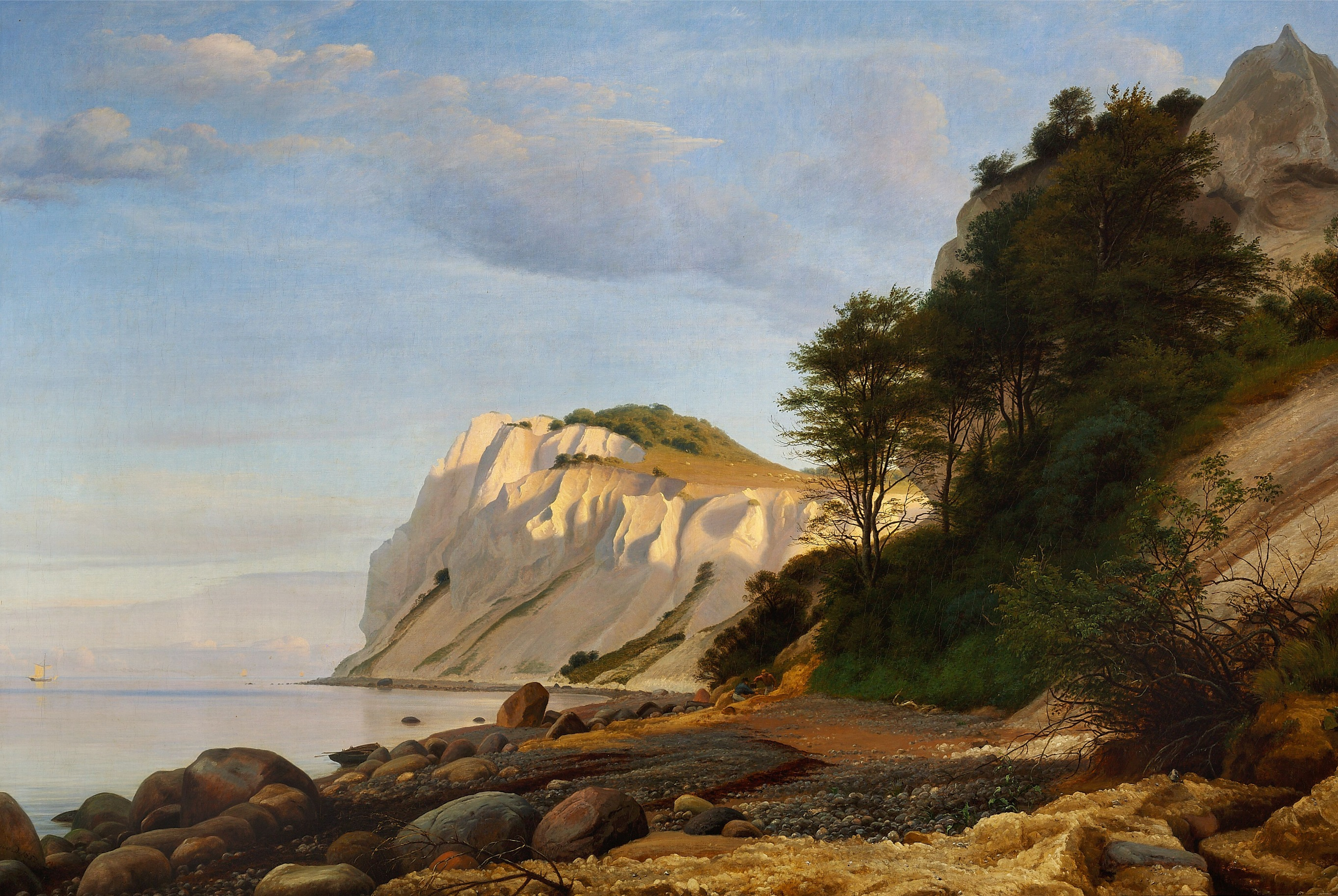
Part of Møns Klint by Peter Christian Skovgaard (1852)

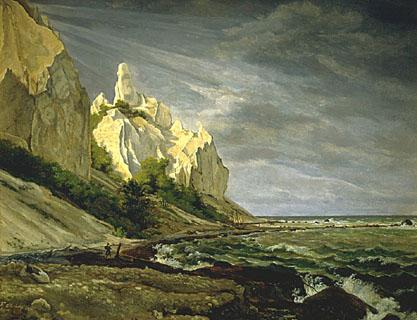
Part of Møns Klint with the Sommerspiret by Frederik Hansen Sødring (1830)

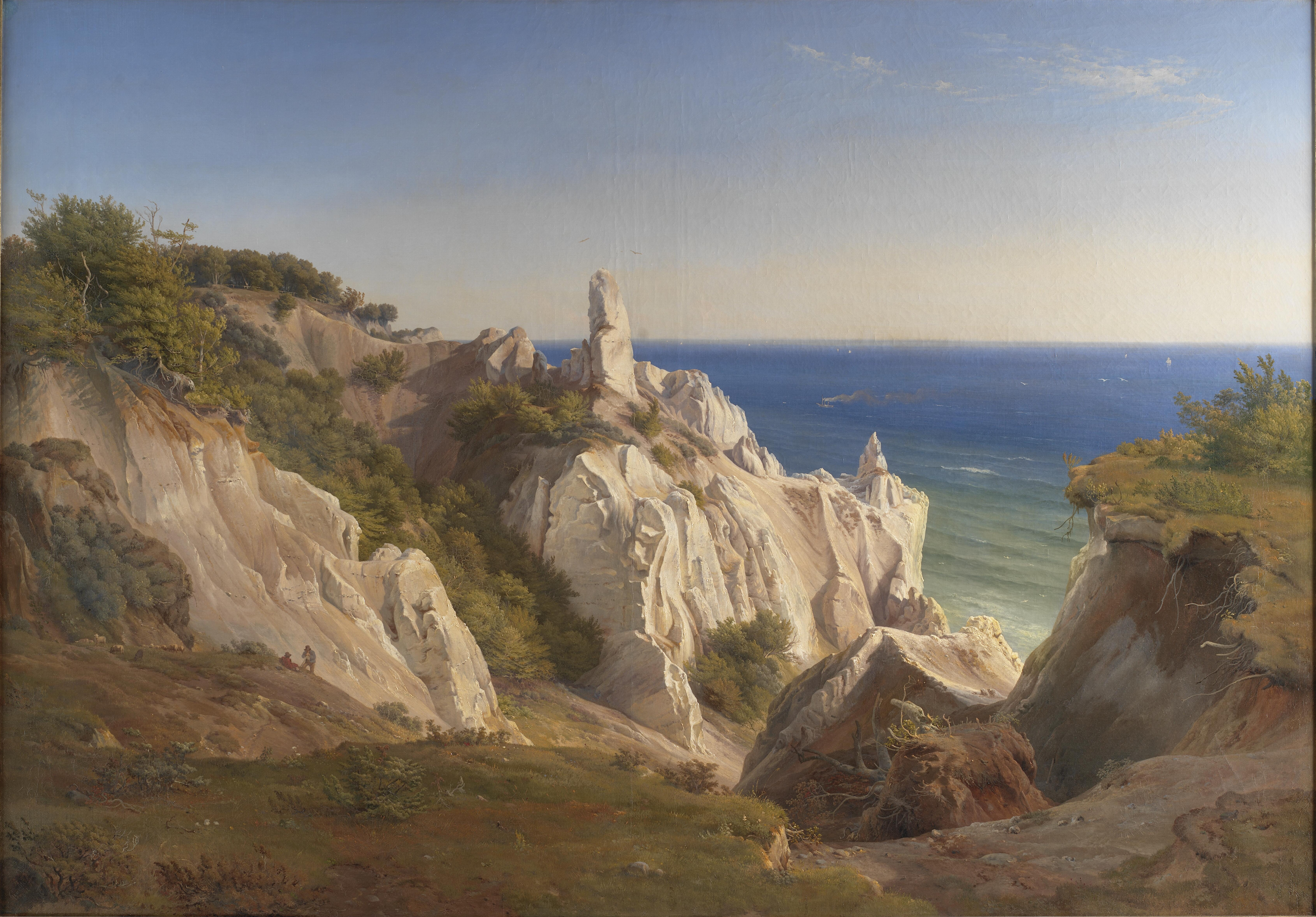
Møns Klint by Louis Gurlitt (1842)
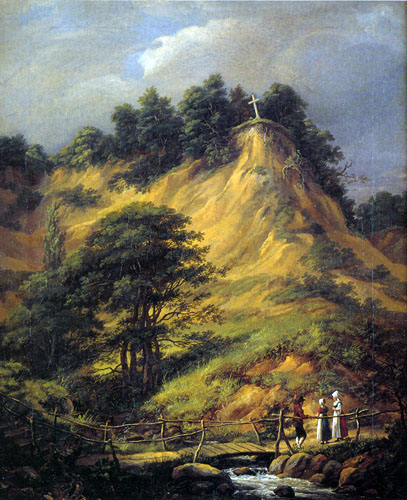
Cliff cross at Møns Klint by Christian Dahl (1815)

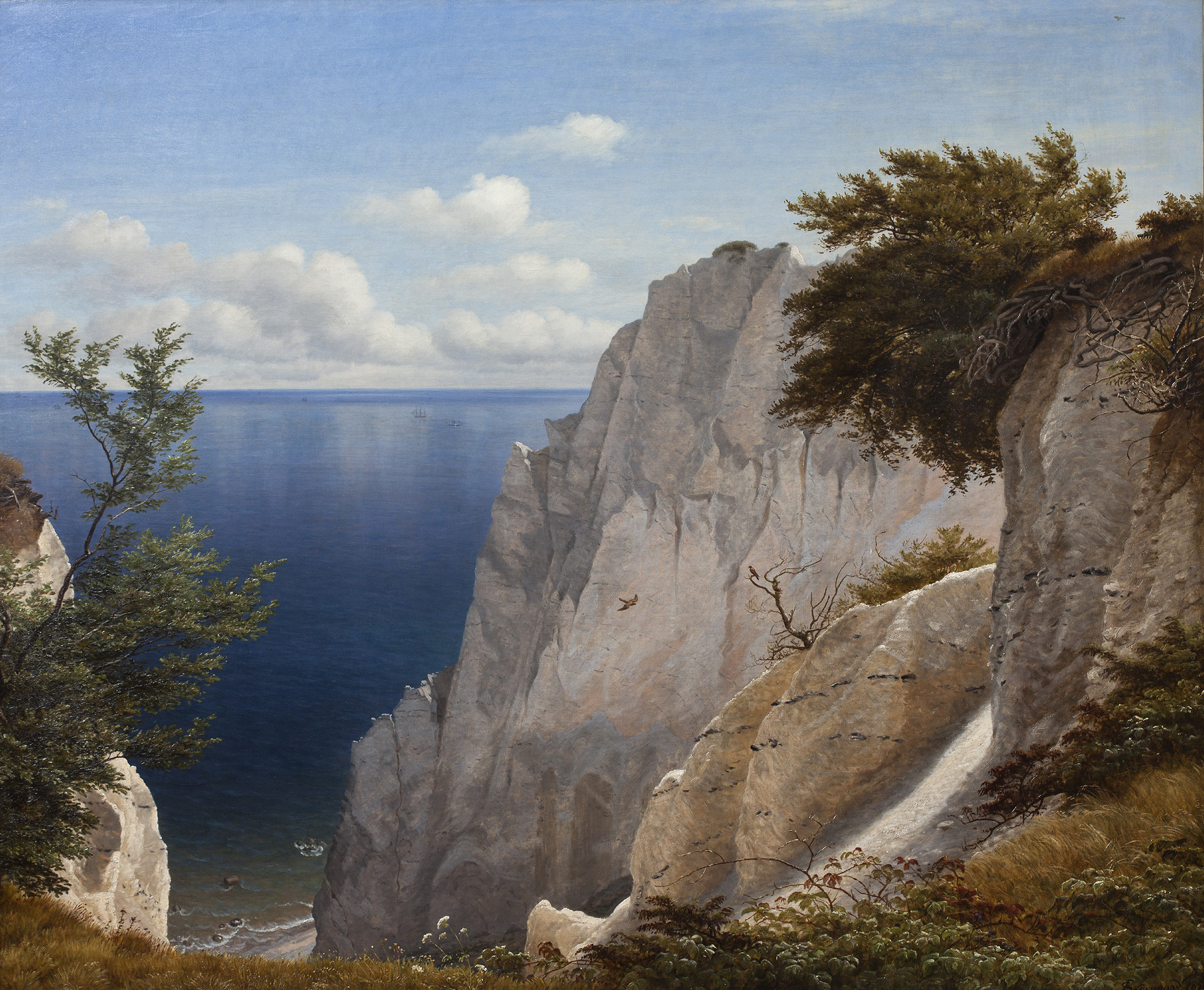
View of the sea from Taleren on Møns Klint by Peter Christian Skovgaard (1851)

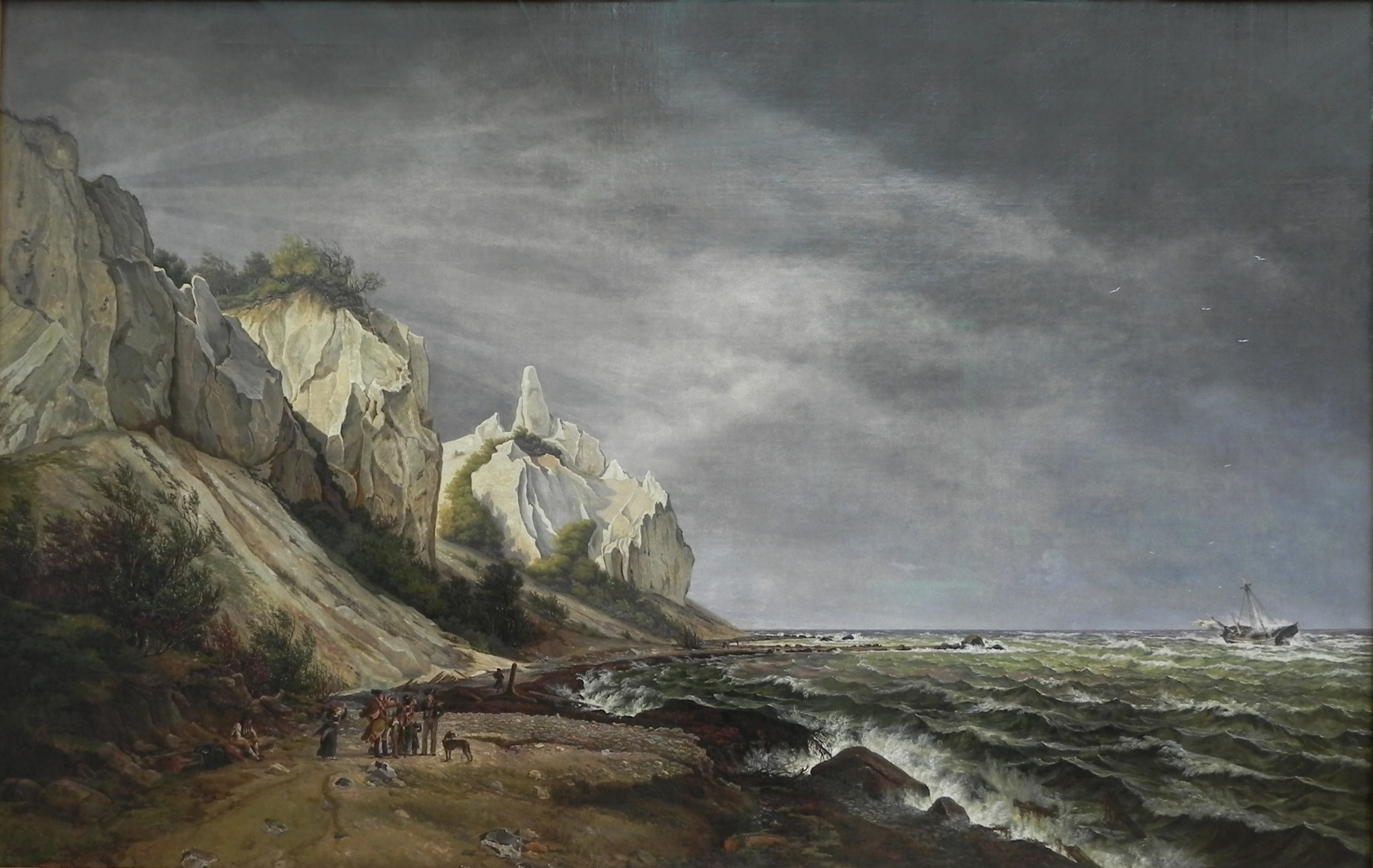
Chalk cliff on Møn by Frederik Hansen Sødring (1831)

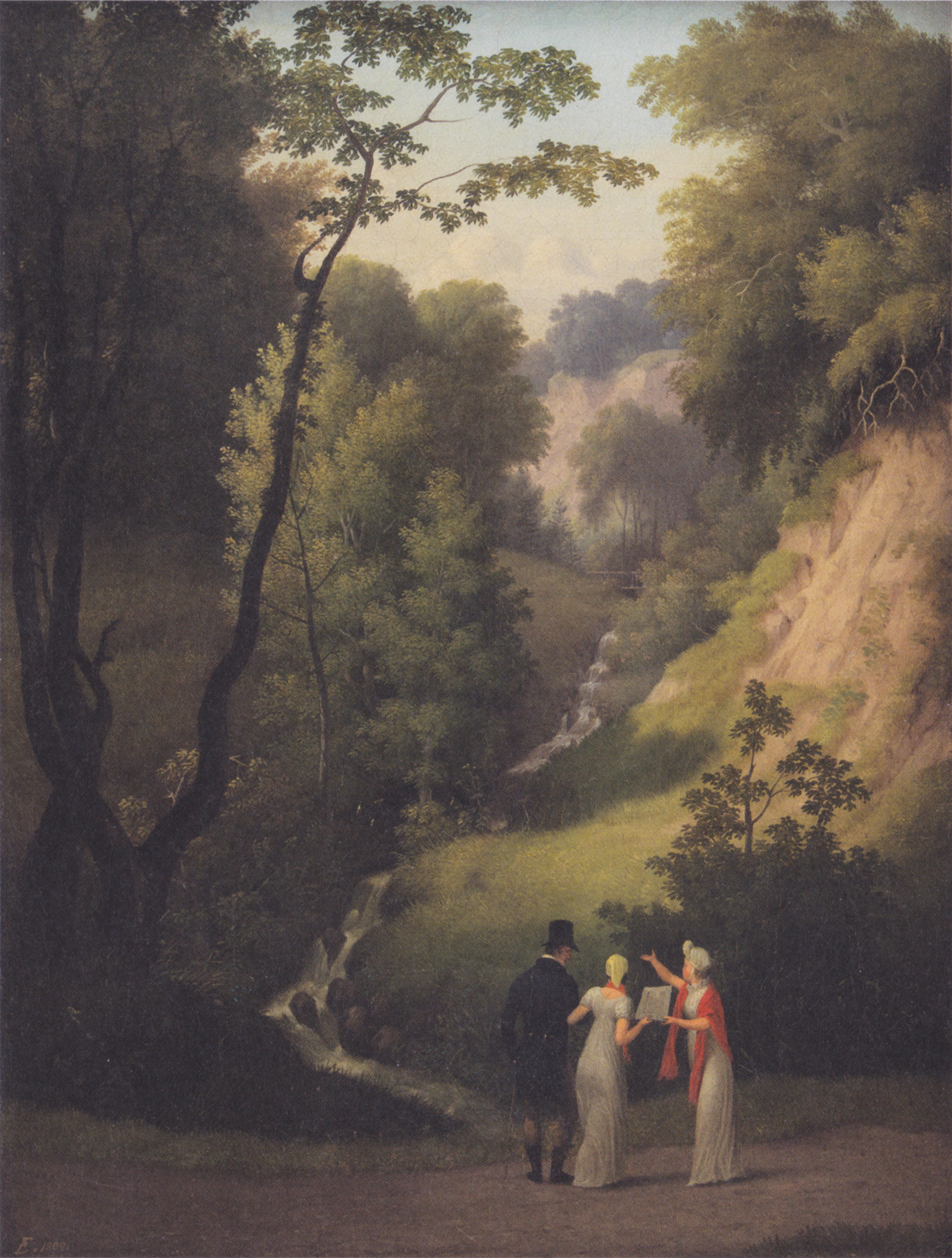
Devil's cleft at Liselund by Christoffer Wilhelm Eckersberg (1809)

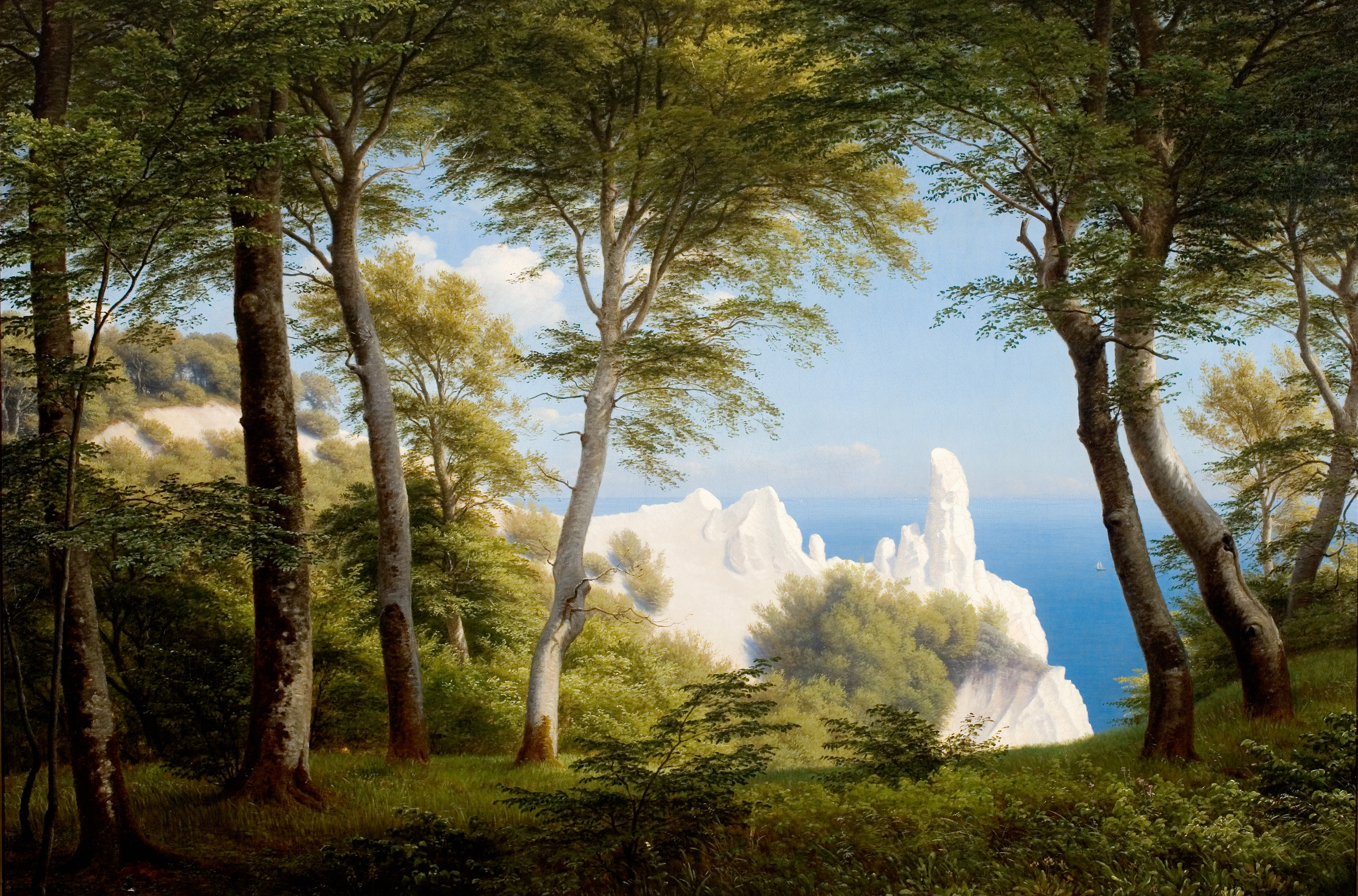
View over the sea from Møns Klint by Peter Christian Skovgaard (1850)
