= Klintholm Havn =

- Fishing village
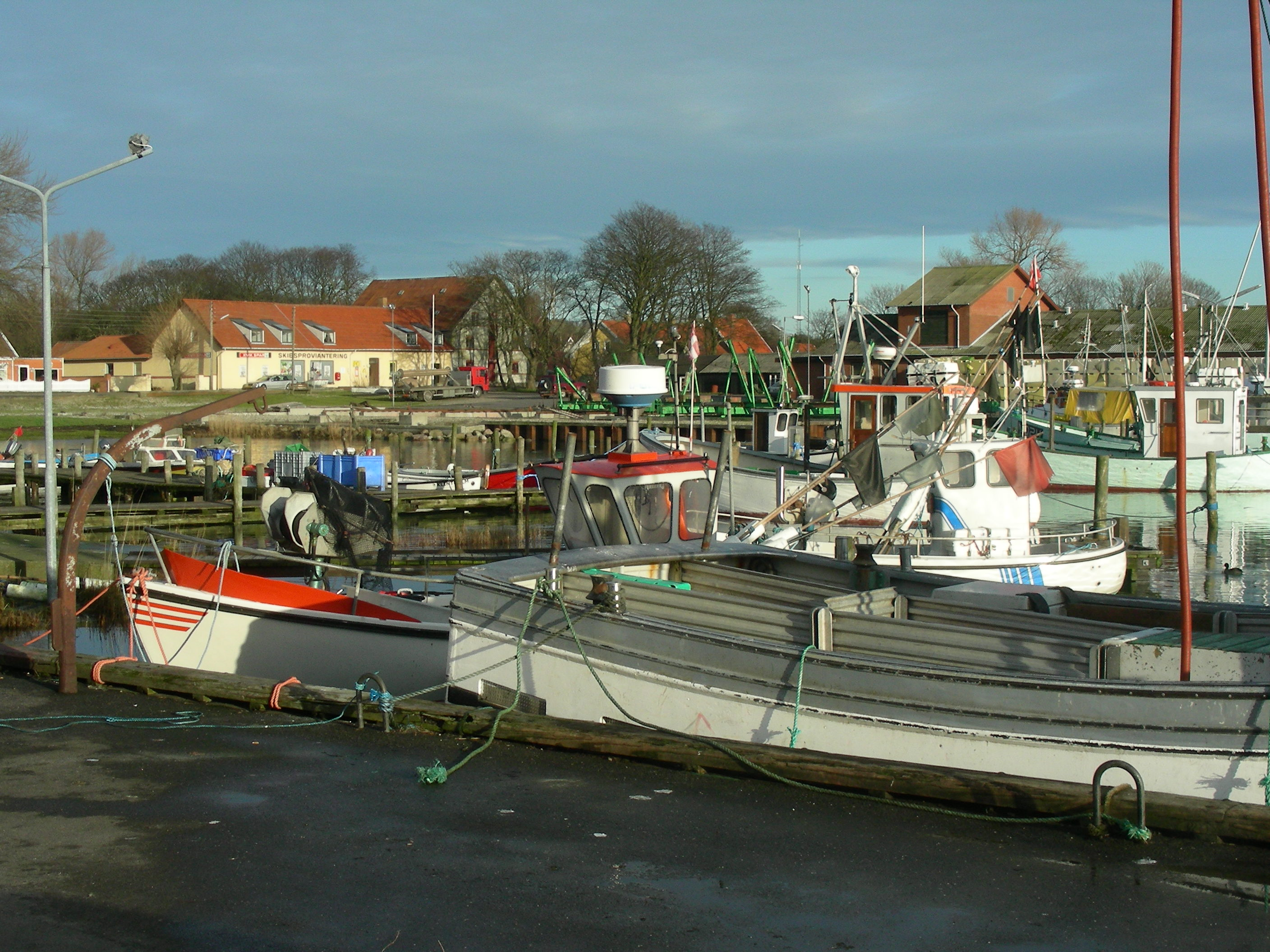
- Klintholm Havn - The fishing harbour

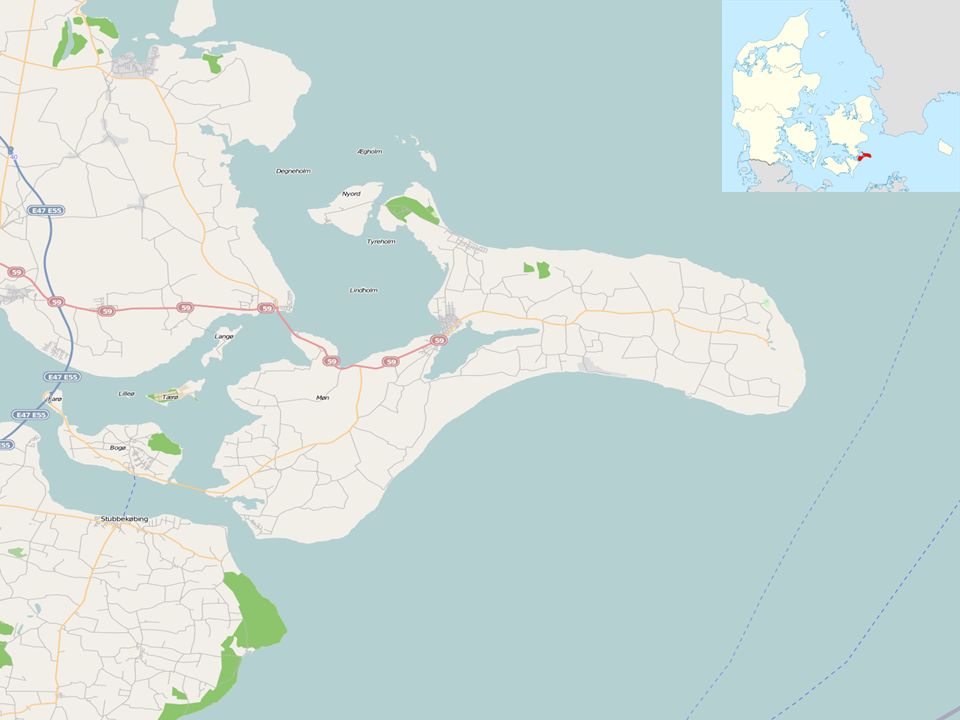
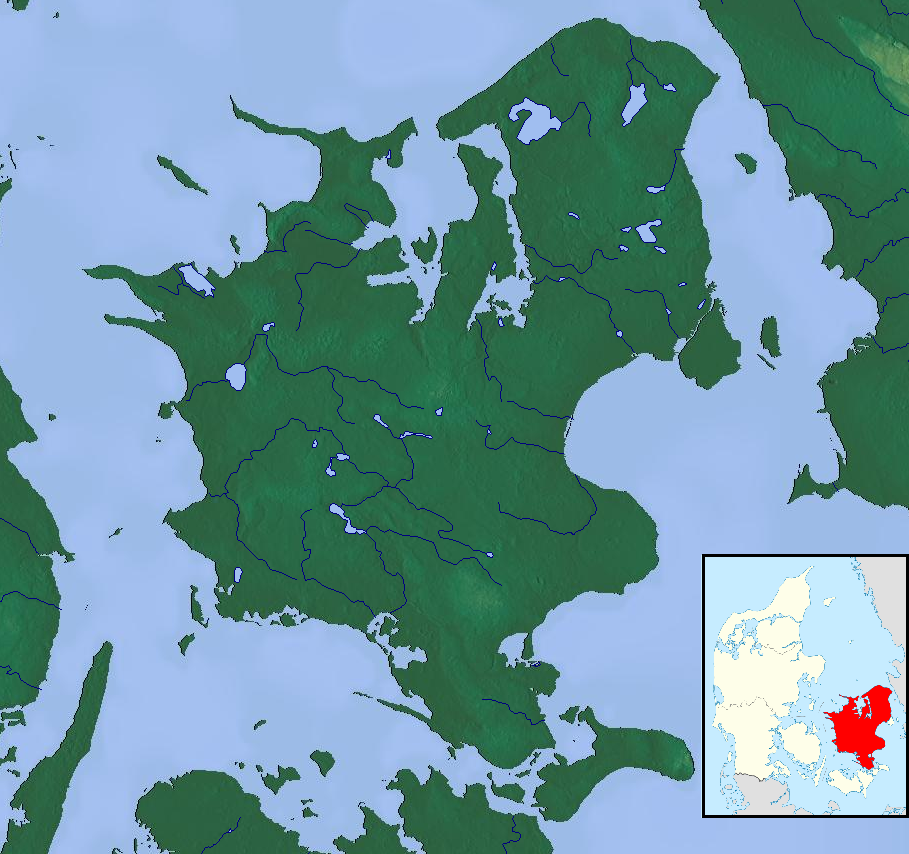
- Location within Møn Location within Zealand Location within Denmark
- Coordinates: 54°57′N 12°28′E
- Country: Denmark
- Region: Sjælland
- Kommune: Vordingborg
- Island: Møn

Population (2012)
  - Total: 201

Klintholm Havn is a fishing village and a popular tourist resort on the south coast of Møn, an island in Vordingborg Municipality, southeastern Denmark. As of 1 January 2012, the population is 201.

The harbour was built in 1878 by C.S. Scavenius, owner of the nearby Klintholm Estate, as a means of exporting local produce and chalk. The harbour is the service port for the 600 MW Kriegers Flak wind farm.

== Attractions ==
Klintholm Havn has now become an active fishing port as well as a popular tourist resort with several restaurants and art galleries. Attractions include the large marina, two sandy beaches, a supermarket and a fresh fish shop.

The marina, which has full facilities, allows boat access at all states of the tide and provides safe haven whatever the wind direction.

In the summer, there are commercial boat excursions providing excellent views of Møns Klint, a stretch of towering chalk cliffs along the eastern coast of the island.

Klinholm Havn can be reached by bus from Stege, 16 km away, which in turn has bus services to Vordingborg where there is a railway station.

== Rescue of Stutthof victims ==
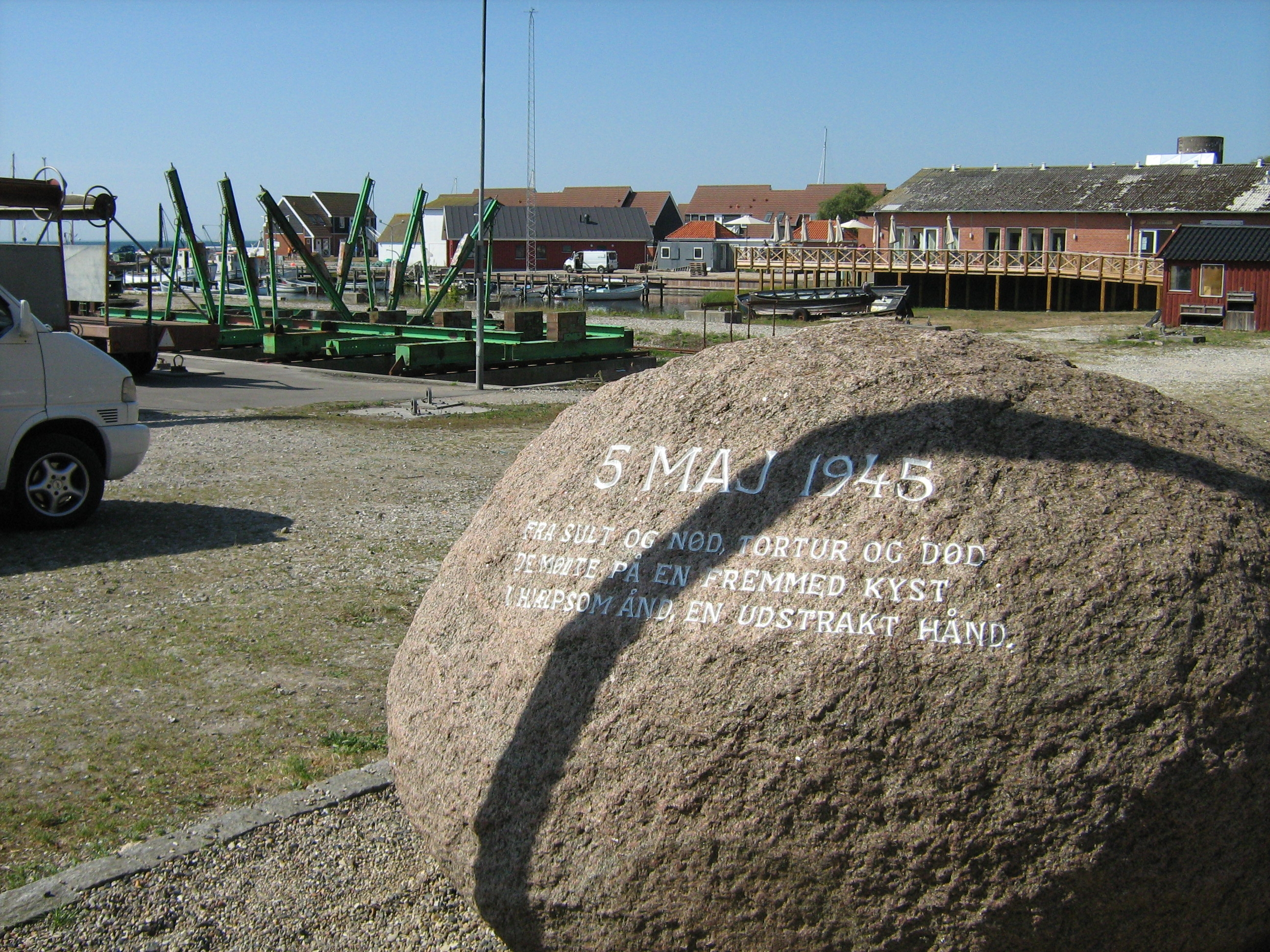
Memorial to Stutthof prisoners

On 5 May 1945, the day Denmark was liberated from German occupation during World War II, a barge with 370 starving prisoners from the Stutthof concentration camp near Danzig (now Gdansk) arrived in Klintholm Havn. Those in control of the concentration camp had forced the prisoners onto the barge and allowed them to drift across the Baltic Sea. A German tug finally brought the barge into the harbour. The local inhabitants managed to save 351 of the prisoners, after the remaining 19 died of disease during the next few days. A memorial stone now stands on the shore of Klinthom Havn at the point where the barge came ashore. It was erected on 5 May 1995, commemorating the 50th anniversary of the event.

== Environment ==
East Møn is a quiet, hilly area with mixed farming. To the east, the ground rises to the wooded natural park which leads to the chalk Cliffs of Møn. There are many varieties of land and sea birds, particularly swallows and swans, while wild deer, squirrels, hare and foxes are among the animal species you are most likely to see. See the article on Møns Klint for more information about the rarer species you can see in the area.

== Climate ==
Møn has a relatively mild climate compared to the rest of Denmark. Data from Denmark's Meteorological Institute show that average mid-summer highs range from 19 C to 26 C while winter daytime averages are around freezing point. Rainfall rarely exceeds 10 days per month.

The summer days are long and bright with about 17 hours of daylight while in the winter, the days are short and often quite dull.

In view of the shallow depth of the Baltic, the temperature of the sea can rise to about 20 C in the summer months. And during exceptionally cold winters, partly as a result of the low salinity of the Baltic, the seawater has also been known to freeze.
