= Sømarkedyssen =

Megalithic tomb in Denmark

Somarkedyssen
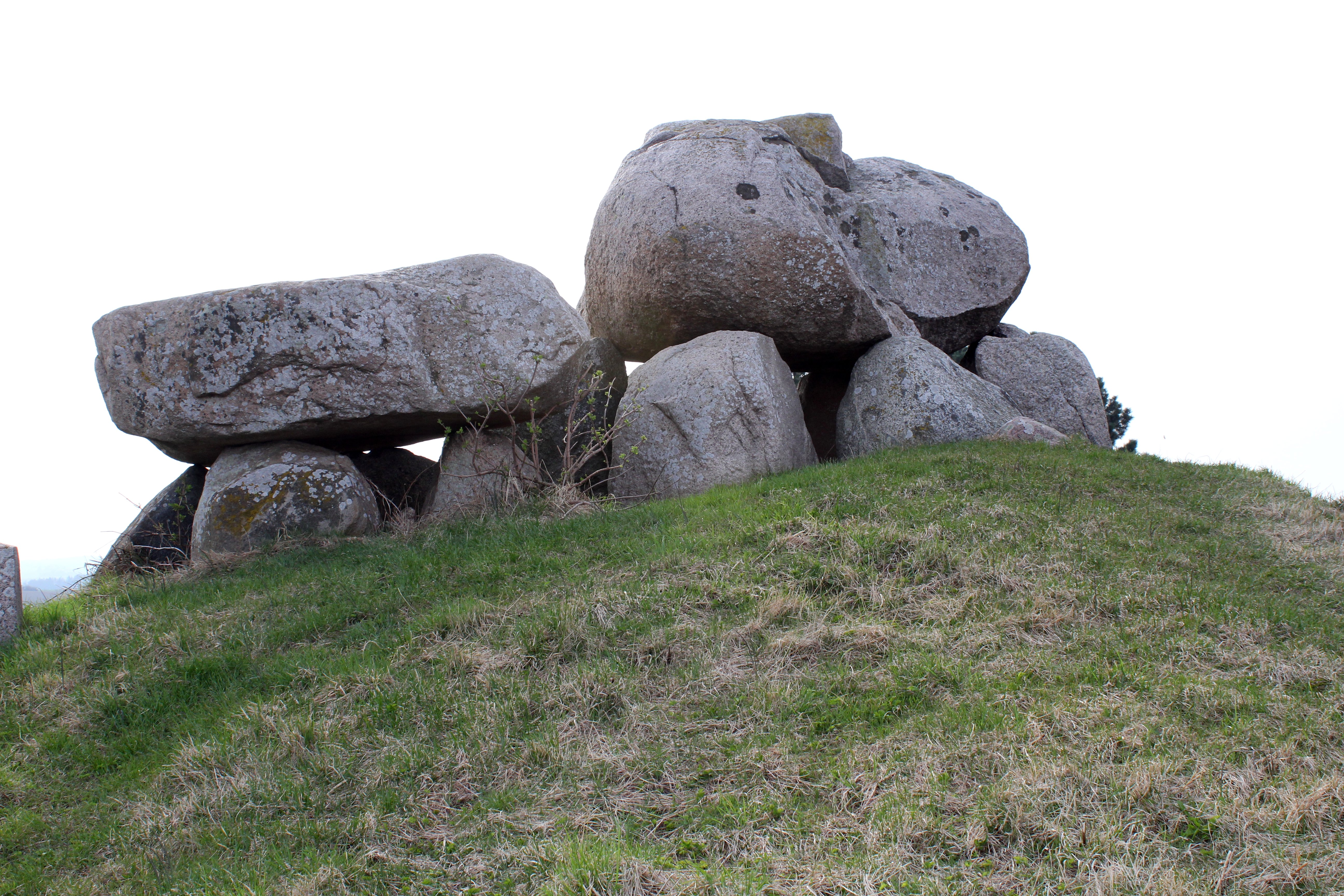
- The tomb in 2011
- Interactive map of Somarkedyssen
- 54.9904°N 12.5025°E
- Type: Tomb
- Location: Borre, Zealand, Denmark

History
- Built: c. 3400 BC

Site notes
- Material: Stone

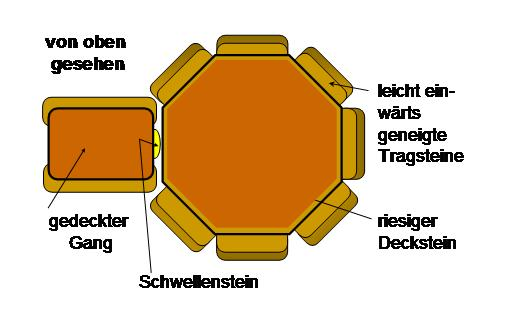
Polygonal dolmen seen from above

Sømarkedyssen is a Neolithic megalithic tomb located in Borre on the Danish island of Møn.

Dating back to around 3400 BC, the tomb consists of an octagonal chamber. A big boulder serves as a capstone, supported by seven load-bearing stones. Leading to the burial chamber, the corridor is covered with a smaller boulder, supported by four stones, whose upper surface has more than 180 bowl-shaped carvings dating from the Bronze Age.

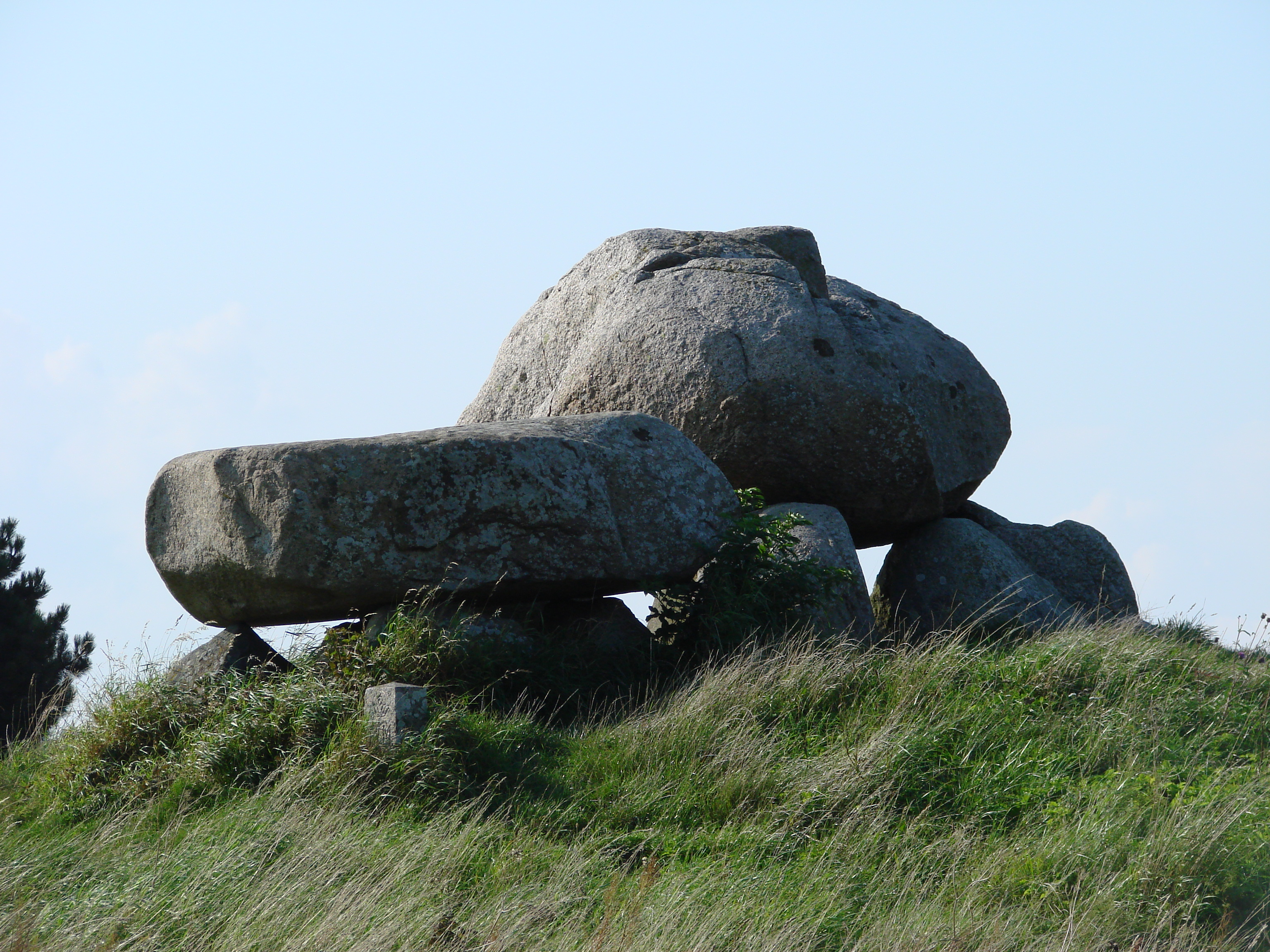
Stendysse Sømarke

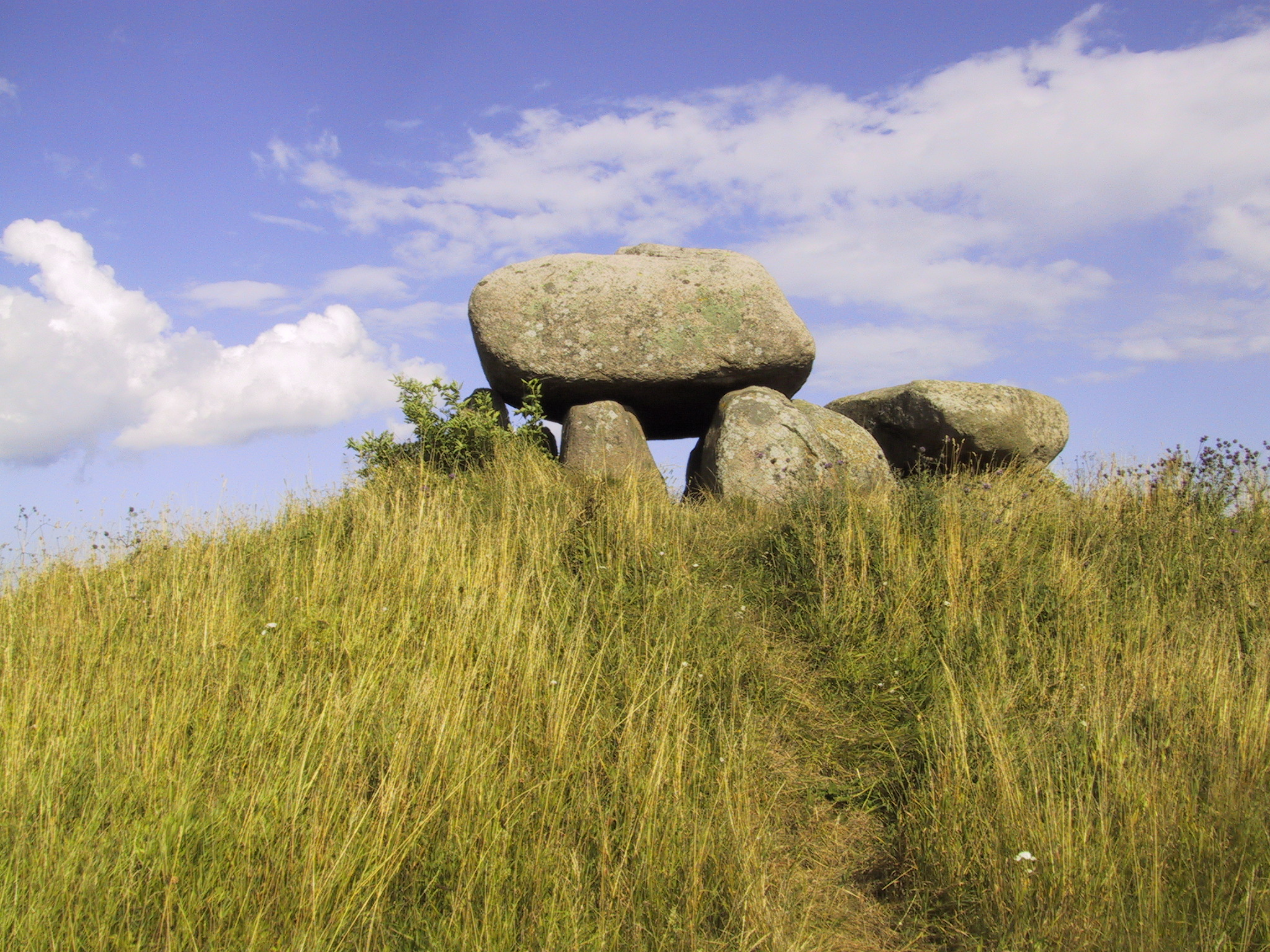
Sømarkedyssen

== Context ==
A total of 119 megalithic tombs of the Neolithic period are known on the 231 square kilometers of the Møn and Bogø islands, of which 38 have been conserved and protected, and 21 were from the Beaker culture which, like polygonal dolmens, emerged towards 3500-2800 BC.

== See also ==
- Megaliths
- Passage tomb
- Grønsalen
- Klekkende Høj

== Bibliography ==
- Karsten Kjer Michaelsen: Politikens bog om Danmarks oldtid. Politiken, Kopenhagen 2002, ISBN 8756764588, p. 217.
- Peter V. Glob: Vorzeitdenkmäler Dänemarks. Wachholtz, Neumünster 1968.
