= Hårbølle =

Coordinates: 54°53′47″N 12°10′26″E

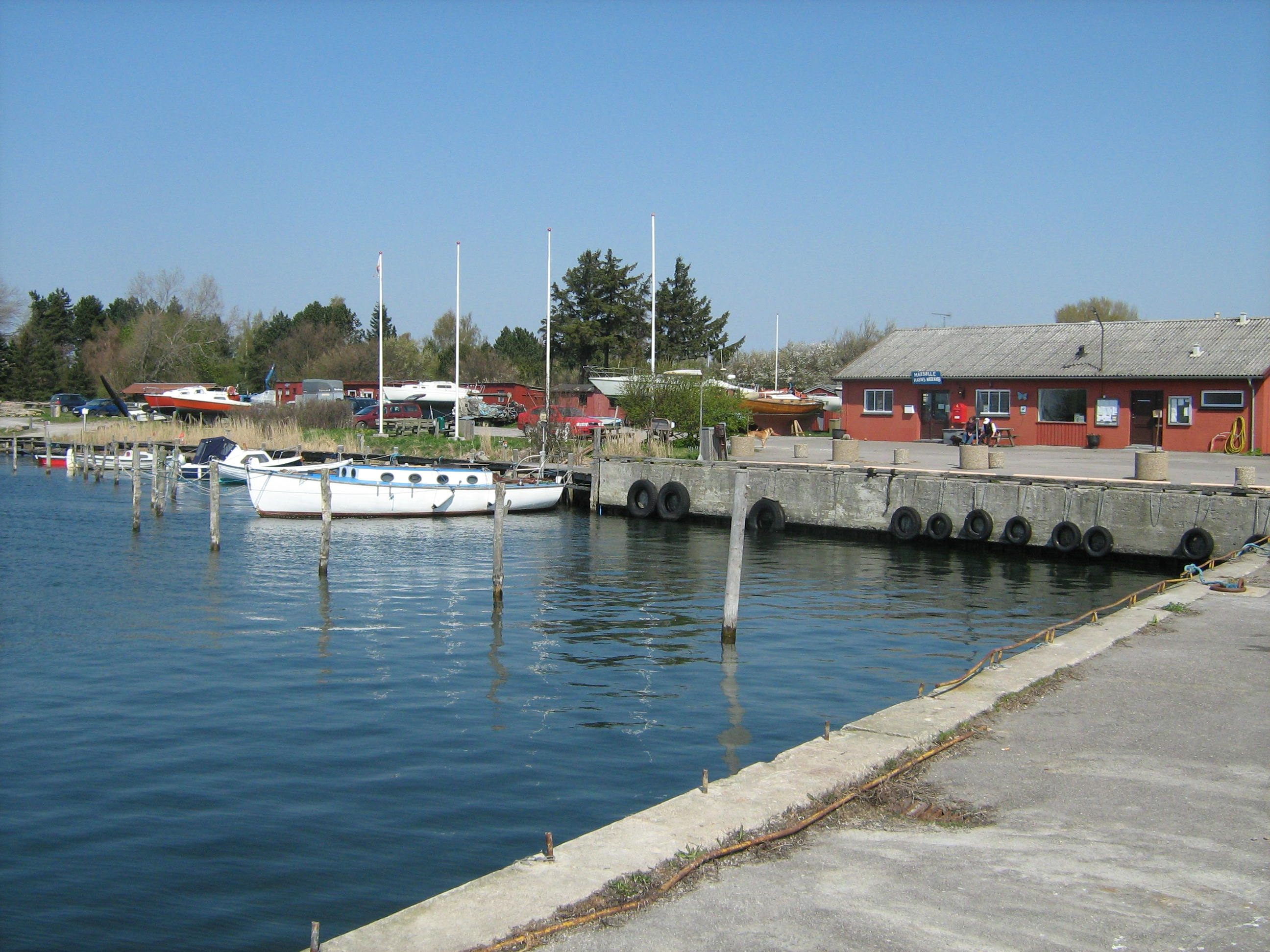
Hårbølle Havn (Hårbølle Harbour)

Hårbølle is a harbour village on the Danish island of Møn some 5 km (3 mi) south of Store Damme. It is located in the parish of Fanefjord in Vordingborg Municipality. Today it is a popular pleasure boat harbour and summer house resort.

== History ==
Hårbølle was inhabited in prehistoric times. Dating from the 16 flint daggers from the late Stone Age have been found in the area as well as a grave from the Bronze Age. The first historical reference to Hårbølle dates from the beginning of the 16th century but the locality was probably founded in the 11th century after the Wends had been overcome and the forests were cleared for new villages. The inhabitants no doubt came from Damme to raise cattle in the area or to practice forestry. In 1727, a riding school was opened and, in 1885, the local school was founded. The harbour once provided steamship connections to Bogø, Stubbekøbing and Masnedsund from where there were rail connections to Copenhagen. When the village was officially founded in 1769, there were 20 farmers and 15 other house owners. At the end of the 19th century, Hårbølle had two general stores, one of which was maintained until ca. 1960. There was also a dairy from 1909 to 1943.

== Hårbølle's stone quarry ==
Founded in 1901, Hårbølle Stenminer (Hårbølle Stone Mines), now Daneflint, is the largest local employer, providing a variety of stones quarried both from the land and the sea near the village.

== Hårbølle today ==
The little harbour is now a popular destination for pleasure boats during the summer months. Thanks to its sandy beaches, the village has also become one of Møn's summer house resorts.

A new Hårbølle Dairy was established by Per Sørup lavet in 2011. The dairy delivers handmade cheeses and other dairy products to a number of Danish Michellin-starred restaurants, including Noma, Geranium, Alchemist and Frederiksminde.

== Neighbouring attractions ==
- Fanefjord Church
- Gronsalen
