= Tonny Jensen =

Tonny Jensen may refer to:

- Tonny Jensen (basketball)
- Tonny Jensen (equestrian)

== See also ==
- Tony Jensen, Australian rugby league footballer
