= Borre, Denmark =

Island in Møn, Denmark

Coordinates: 54.99524°N 12.44322°E

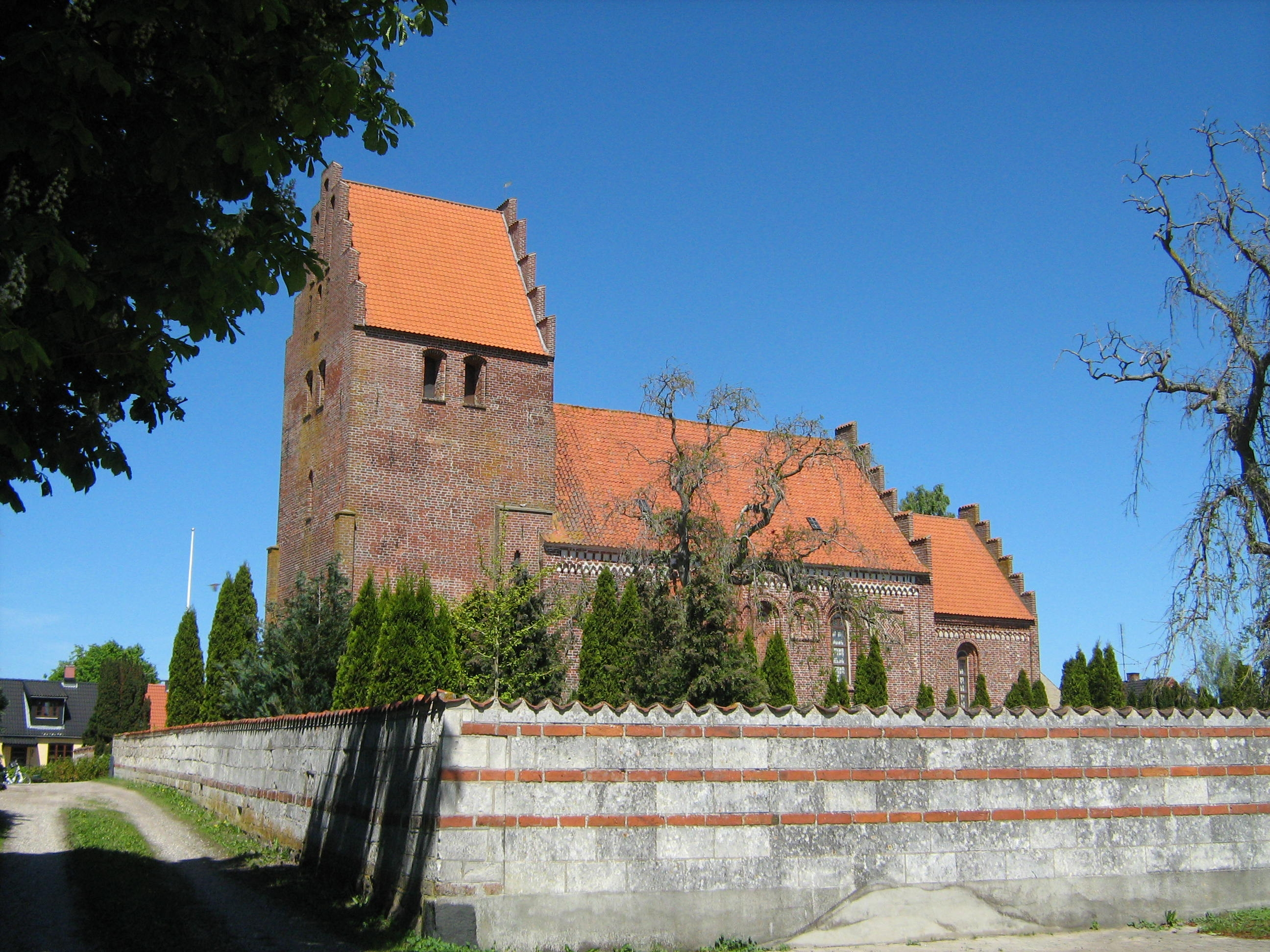
Borre Church

Borre is a village on the island of Møn in south-eastern Denmark. It is located in the eastern part of the island at the foot of a hill leading up to Møns Klint and Liselund. With a population of 229 in the village and 452 in the parish as of 1 January 2026, it is the third largest community on the island after Stege and Store Damme. Now part of Vordingborg Municipality, it belongs to Region Zealand.

In the Middle Ages, Borre was a market town which owed its prosperity to the herring fishing industry. The drained area now referred to as Borre Sømose was then a navigable inlet connected to the sea.

== History ==
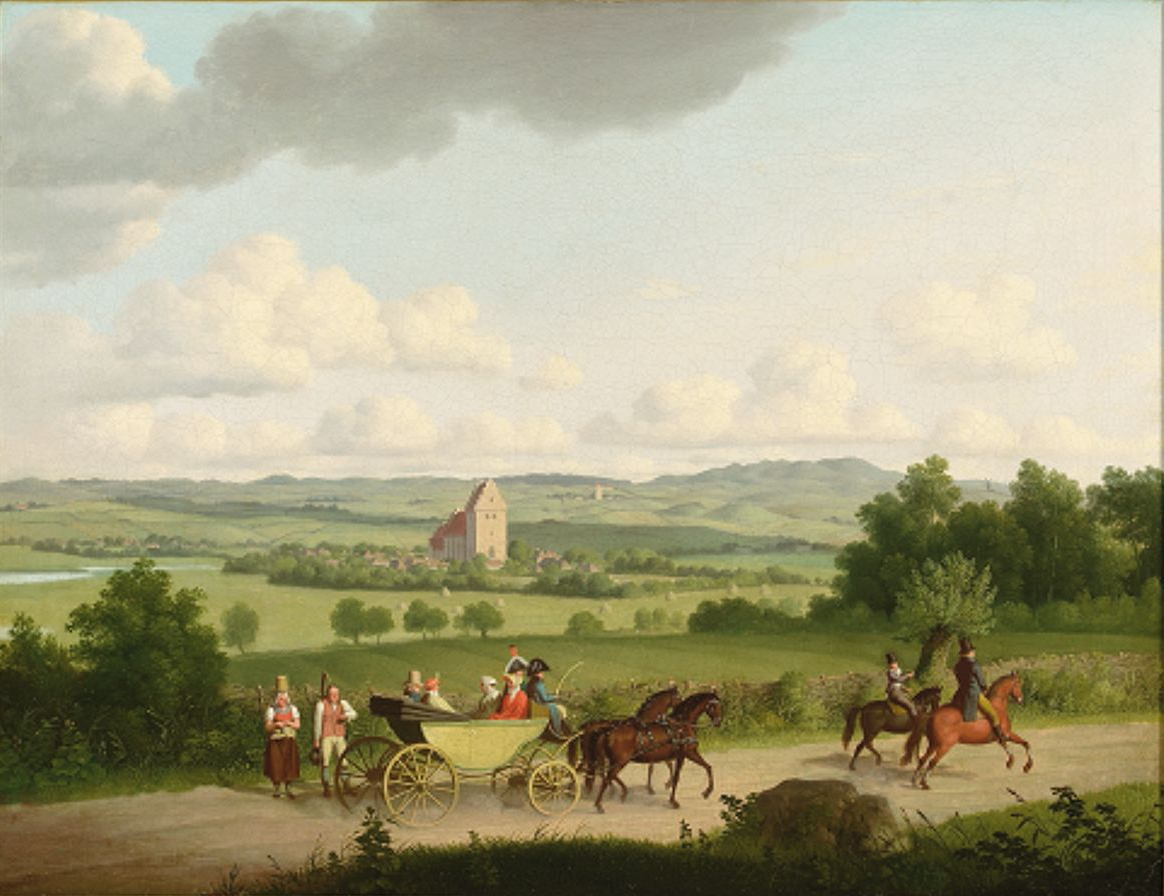
C. W. Eckersberg: Borre Church, Møn, 1810.

Borre Church was built at the beginning of the 13th century in the Romanesque style with rounded arches. It is probably one of the oldest churches on the island as parts of the nave and choir are from the first half of the 13th century. The late-Gothic tower, porch and sacristy from about 1517 are built of brick.

Borre received its privileges as a market town in 1460. They were reconfirmed in 1488 and 1514.

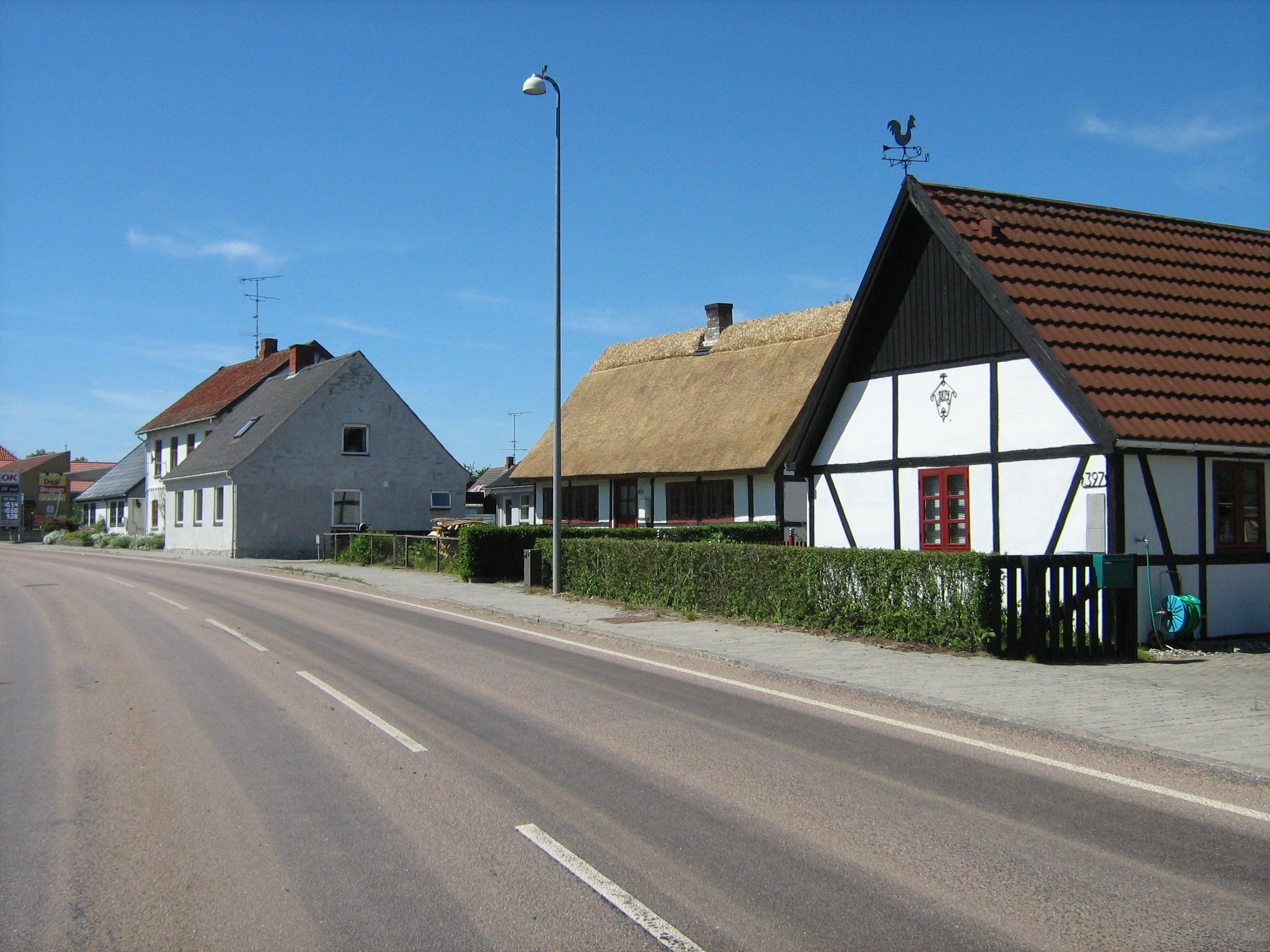
Main street in Borre

The first historical reference to Borre is from 1510 when it was plundered by the Lübeckers from northern Germany. They burnt down many of the houses and set fire to the church with the result that all its timberwork was destroyed leaving only the bare walls. In 1648, King Frederick III renewed Borre's privileges as a market town although it had already lost its importance as a trading centre. The herring fishing industry had declined as most of the fish had left the area and the fjord was filling up with sand.

Like many other villages on Møn, at the beginning of the 21st century Borre had a post office, a bank and several shops. The shops have now mostly been taken over by handicraft artists and antique dealers. In Ny Borre, or Holme as it is known locally, there used to be a sugar beet plant where the raw sugar juice was extracted and sent to the sugar factory in Stege by pipe. There was also an 11-km-long narrow-gauge railway which transported the sugar beets to Borre from the surrounding area with branches to Busemarke, Mandemarke and Råbymagle.

== Notable people ==
- Tonny Jensen (born 1941 in Borre), a Danish equestrian, competed at the 1976 Summer Olympics
