= Karen Strand =

Danish jewellery designer

Karen Strand (7 January 1924 – 10 February 2000) was a Danish goldsmith and jewellery designer. One of the first students to study at the Goldsmiths College (Guldsmedehøjskolen) in Copenhagen, she is remembered for her simplistic style, creating chains threaded with stones. After working for the jeweller A. Dragsted, she established her own business in 1962.

== Early life and education ==
Born in Kirke Hyllinge near Lejre on 1 January 1924, Karen Strand was the daughter of the car dealer Gerhardt Petersen (1898–1975) and Christine Jensen (1900–1941). As a result of her mother's poor health, she was raised in her grandparents' home, an inn in Hornsherred. She grew up in a musical environment; her mother sang and her grandfather often arranged singing evenings at the inn. Strand developed an interest in music, arts and crafts. After attending Roskilde Cathedral School, she worked as a maid in the home of the painter Sigurd Swane and his wife Agnete where she met several prominent artists. She then learnt the art of goldsmithing with Andersen & Enig in Roskilde (1941–46), with the jeweller A. Michelsen (1946–47) and with Just Andersen (1947–54). When the Goldsmiths College opened in 1951, she became the first female student, studying there until 1953.

== Career ==
Strand soon became one of Denmark's most accomplished jewellery artists, creating works of high artistic quality. In 1952, she was awarded Det tekniske Selskab's silver medal for young artists, and in 1953 and 1966 she won the first prize in the contest arranged by the Goldsmiths Council (Guldsmedefagets Fællesråd).

In 1954, she embarked on eight years employment with the jewellers A. Dragsted, first working in the shop but later becoming the leading designer and serving as the firm's director. From 1962, she ran her own workshop in Pilestræde in central Copenhagen for the next 12 years where she initially concentrated on gold pieces but later moved to silver with raw stones and pearls. One of her most successful creations was the innovative Serpentinekæede or Serpentine Chain series, in 1964, primarily for bracelets.

For many years, Strand also maintained close collaboration with furniture designers, especially in regard to integrating metal components into furniture. This culminated in the exhibition Ædelt træ og ædle stene (Noble Wood and Noble Stones) where she exhibited both raw and worked stones.

After becoming divorced from her first husband, the antique book dealer Henry Gustav Bøgelund, in 1971, she moved with her new partner Per Sæbö to Sørnes in the north of Norway where she opened a small workshop. In 1973, she returned to Karlslunde in Denmark, moved first to Jersie in 1983 and then to the little village of Hjelm on the island of Møn in 1987. In 1992, thanks to her support, the Danish Jewellery Museum (Danmarks Smykkemuseum) was inaugurated in Store Damme.

== Personal life ==
Karen Strand died in Copenhagen on 10 February 2000.
