= Fanefjord Church =

Church in Mon, Denmark

Coordinates: 54°54′4.7″N 12°9′3.5″E

- Fanefjord Kirke
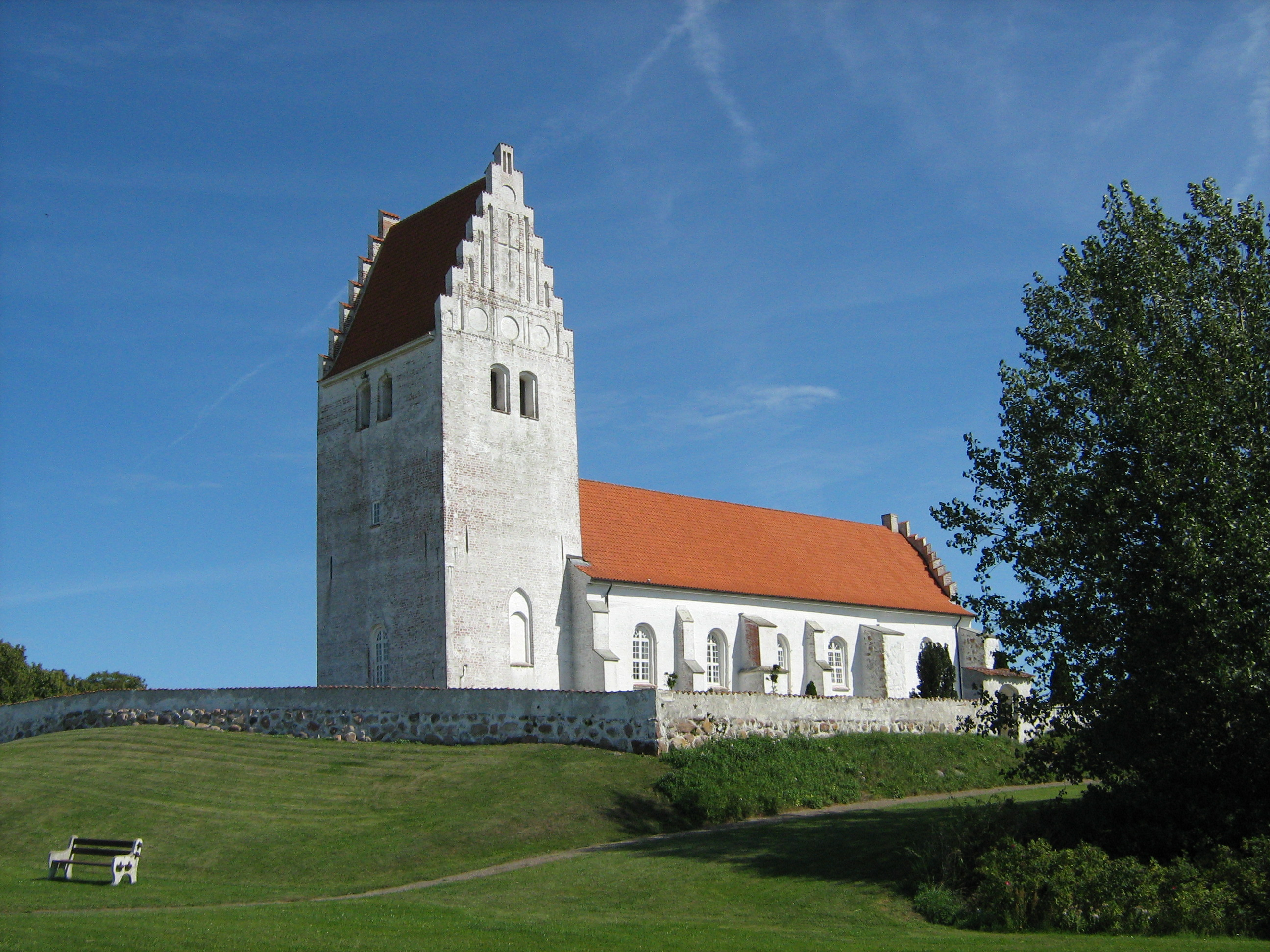
- Fanefjord Church
- Location: Møn
- Country: Denmark
- Denomination: Church of Denmark

Architecture
- Years built: 13th century

Administration
- Diocese: Diocese of Roskilde
- Deanery: Stege-Vordingborg Provsti
- Parish: Fanefjord Sogn

Fanefjord Church (Fanefjord kirke) is on the Danish island of Møn. It is located in an open setting overlooking the Baltic Sea inlet of Fanefjord between Store Damme and Hårbølle. Standing on the top of a small hill, the church's red-tiled roof and whitewashed walls can be seen from considerable distances, whatever the direction. The interior is of particular historical interest, in view of the many frescos dating back to the 13th and 16th centuries and Fanefjord Church is considered the most famous attraction on Møn.

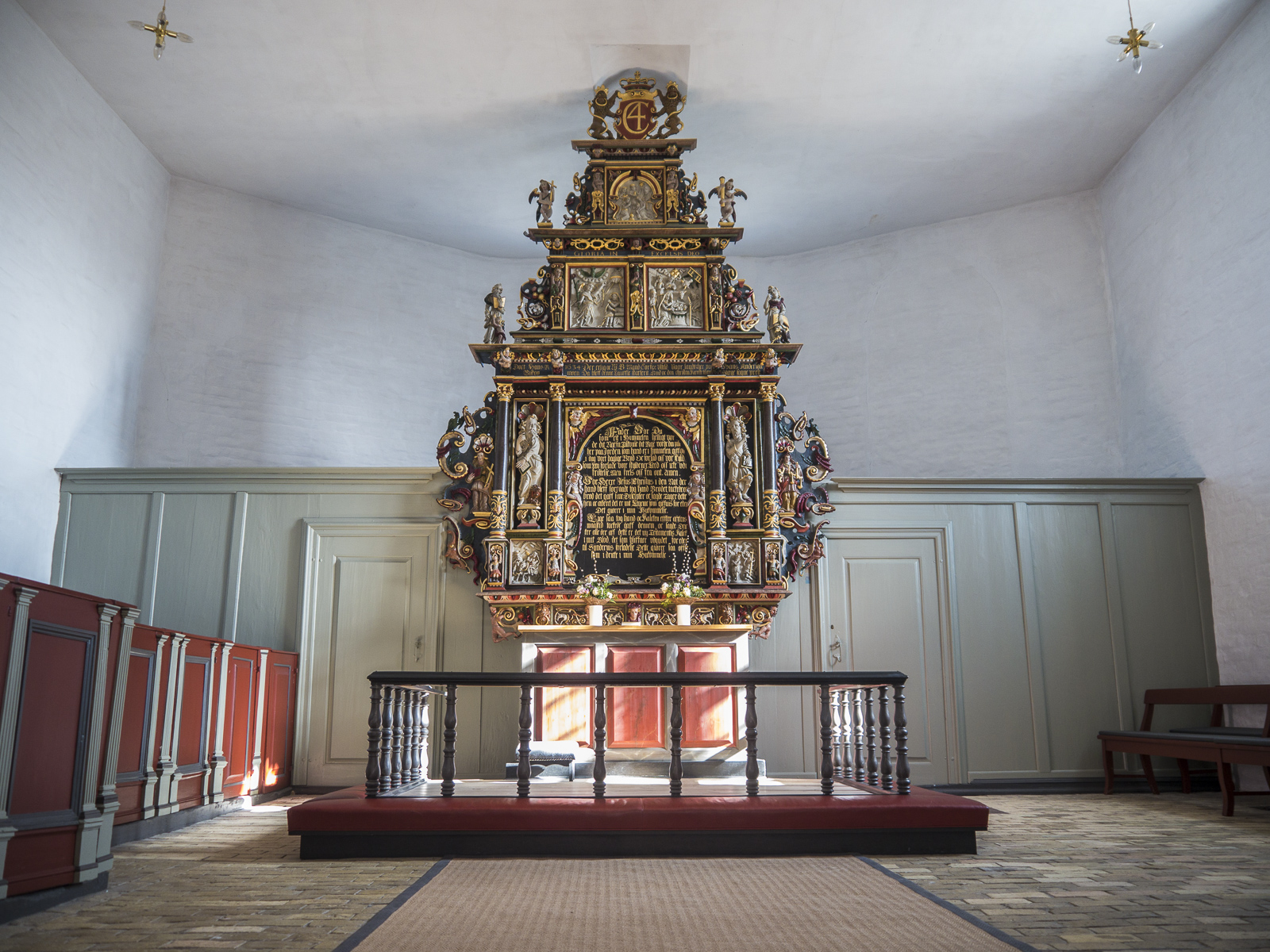
Fanefjord Church altar

== History ==
The site itself is of considerable historic interest. A few hundred meters to the south of the church there is a particularly long barrow, Grønsalen, the supposed burial ground of queen Fane and her husband king Grøn Jæger who according to local folklore, lived some 4,000 years ago.

The church's original 7 m high nave dates back to the second half of the 13th century. The cross vaults in the nave were added around 1300. In about 1500, the porch and tower were completed and the choir was built around 1660. In 1825, the church was bought by the Klintholm Estate which maintained ownership for almost 100 years.

It may appear surprising that such a large church was built at a time (ca. 1250 AD) when the parish only had about 300 inhabitants. One explanation may be that there was considerable trade through the fjord with ports of the Hanseatic League. The traders may well have contributed to the construction, both financially and by helping with the construction.

== Frescos ==
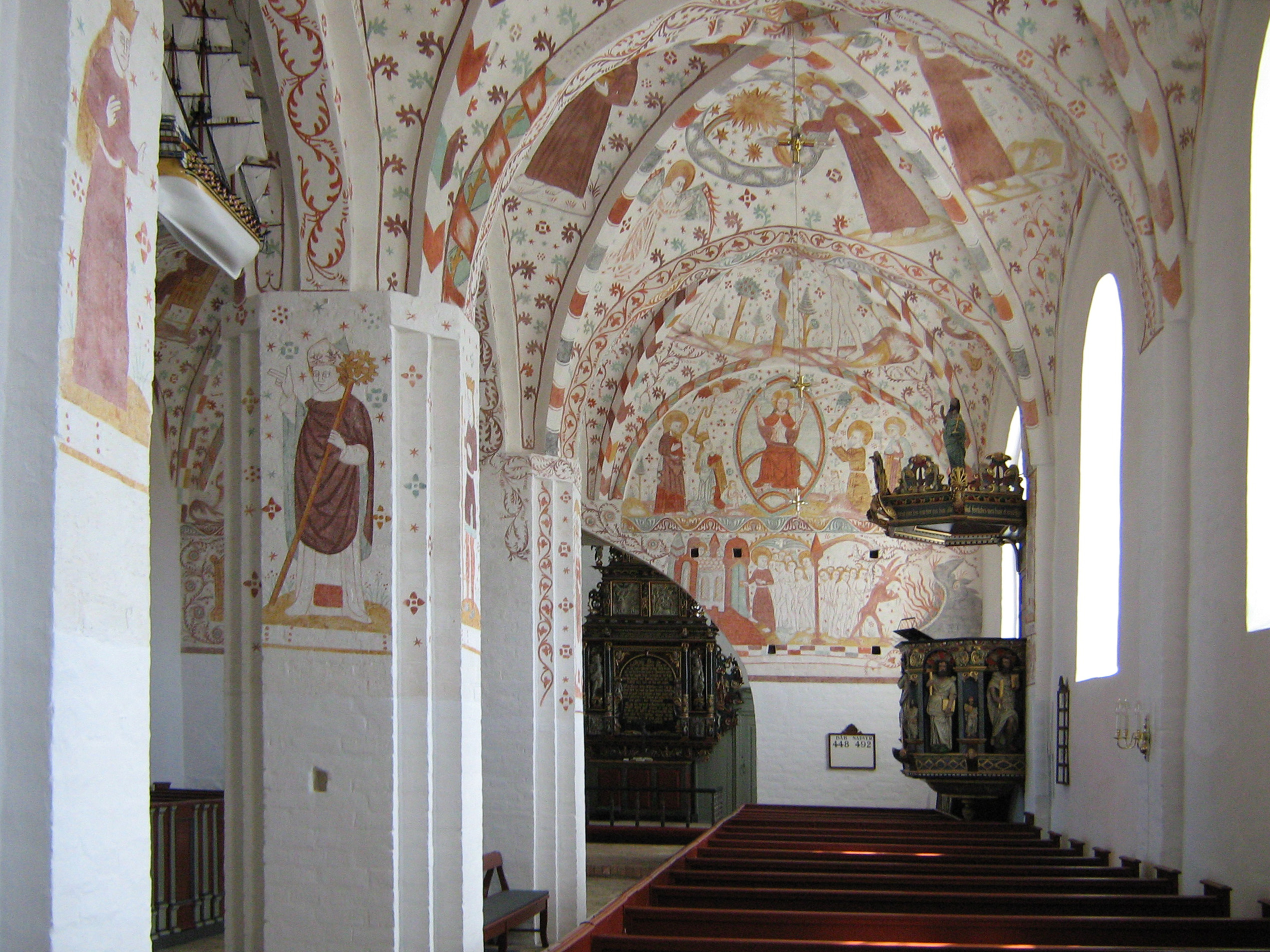
Church's interior after restoration

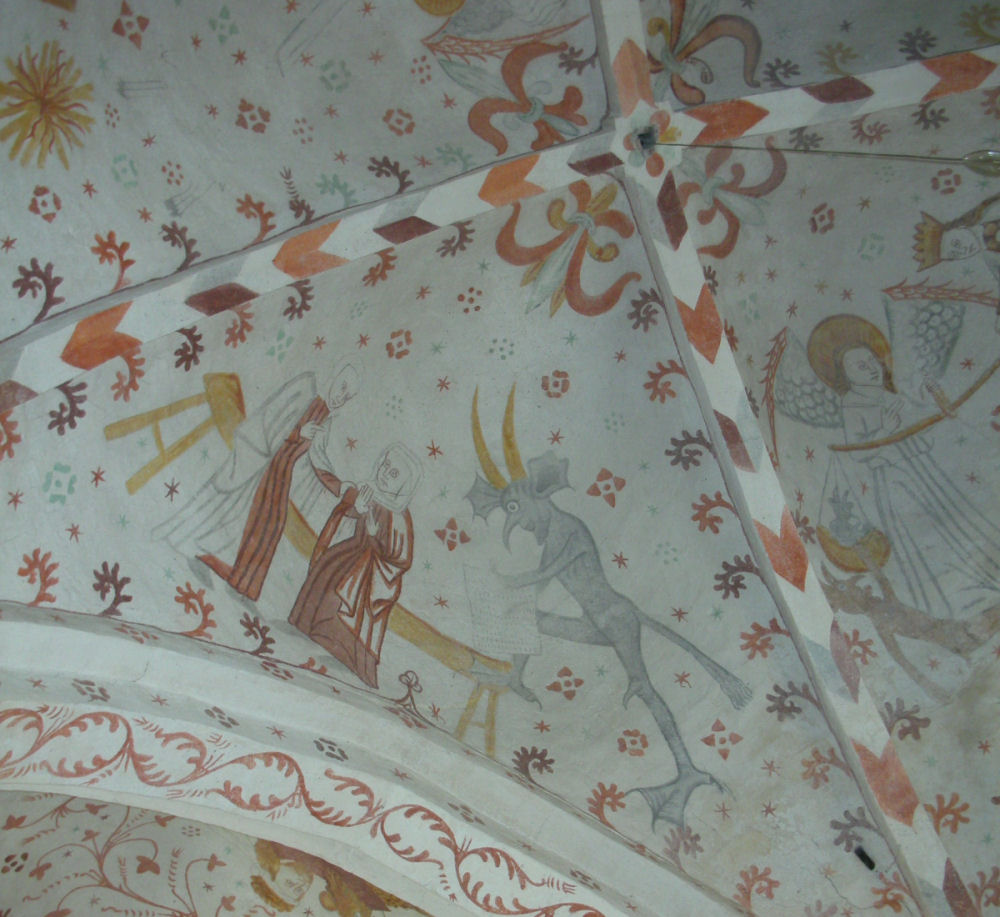
Frescoes in the church's nave

For many generations, Fanefjord's Church frescos were hidden under a covering of plaster. After frescos had been discovered at the end of the 19th century in Møn's Elmelunde Church, those in Fanefjord were painstakingly uncovered from 1932 to 1934 under the guidance of the National Museum. In 2009, major restoration work was completed on the frescos, revealing their original colours and impact.

The earliest frescos, on the triumphal arch, were painted around 1350. They depict the four evangelists, as well as St Christopher and St George. The most famous frescos are however those dating back to about 1500 which cover large areas of the church's ceiling and upper walls. In the so-called Biblia pauperum style, they present many of the most popular stories from the Old and New Testaments.

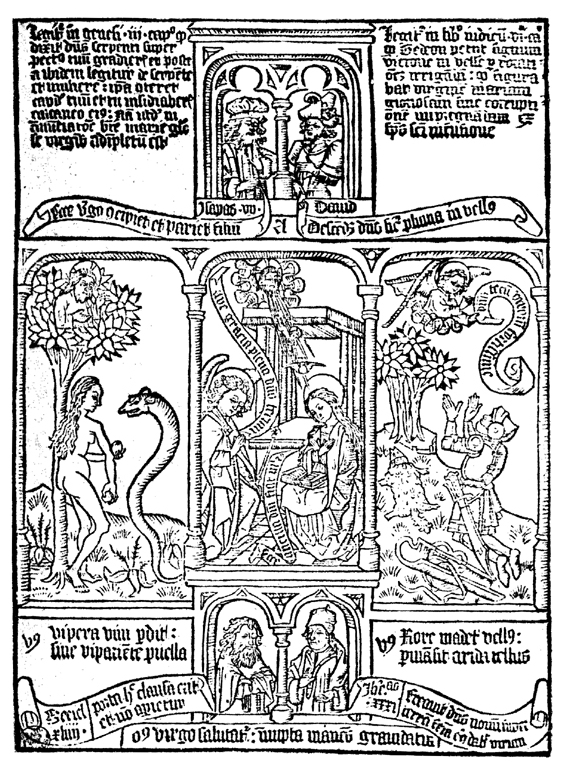
Biblia Pauperum

=== Elmelunde Master ===
The artist, who can be identified by the emblem he included in the decorations, is known simply as the Elmelunde Master (Elmelundemesteren), as it was he and his team who also painted the frescos in Elmelunde Church as well as Keldby Church. It is probable that there were several artists in the Elmelunde workshop who collaborated in decorating churches in the area as other emblems and various in style have been observed.

The warm colours ranging from dark red and russet to yellow, green, grey and black are distinctive. Another typical feature is the expressionless faces of the sleepy-eyed people, turned to the left or right while their bodies face the front. All the images, including the surrounding stonework, are decorated with ornaments such as stars, plants and trees. The images themselves appear to have been inspired partly from block-prints from a Dutch or German Biblia Pauperum, a book containing some 40 pages of drawings depicting stories from the Bible.

Other sources probably included the Bible itself, legends, apocryphal writings and other illustrations. Initially, the wall paintings appear to have covered the entire church including the lower parts of the walls which are now whitewashed. Traces of work in these areas have been found but the images were not sufficiently clear to warrant restoration.

== Other features ==
The church contains a number of other interesting features:

=== The choir ===
The choir, which was renovated in the 17th century in a different, but compatible style, consists of an impressive altarpiece, the original candlesticks and a new altar.

=== The pulpit ===
The ornate pulpit is from about 1645 and bears King Christian IV's emblem. Among the carved figures are Christ, Jacob, St Peter and one of the apostles.

=== The organ ===
A new organ built by Frobenius & Sønner with 10 stops, two keyboards and a pedalboard, was installed in 1998.

== Graveyard ==
Notable people buried in the graveyard include:

- Johan Paludan (1756-1821), author, journalist, editor and priest
- Bent Barfoed (1920-2007), film director, film producer and animator
- Eva Gredal (1927-1995), politician
- Henning Christiansen (1932-2008), composer and professor and artist
- Kaj Otto Gredal (1925-1992), civil servant

== Gallery ==
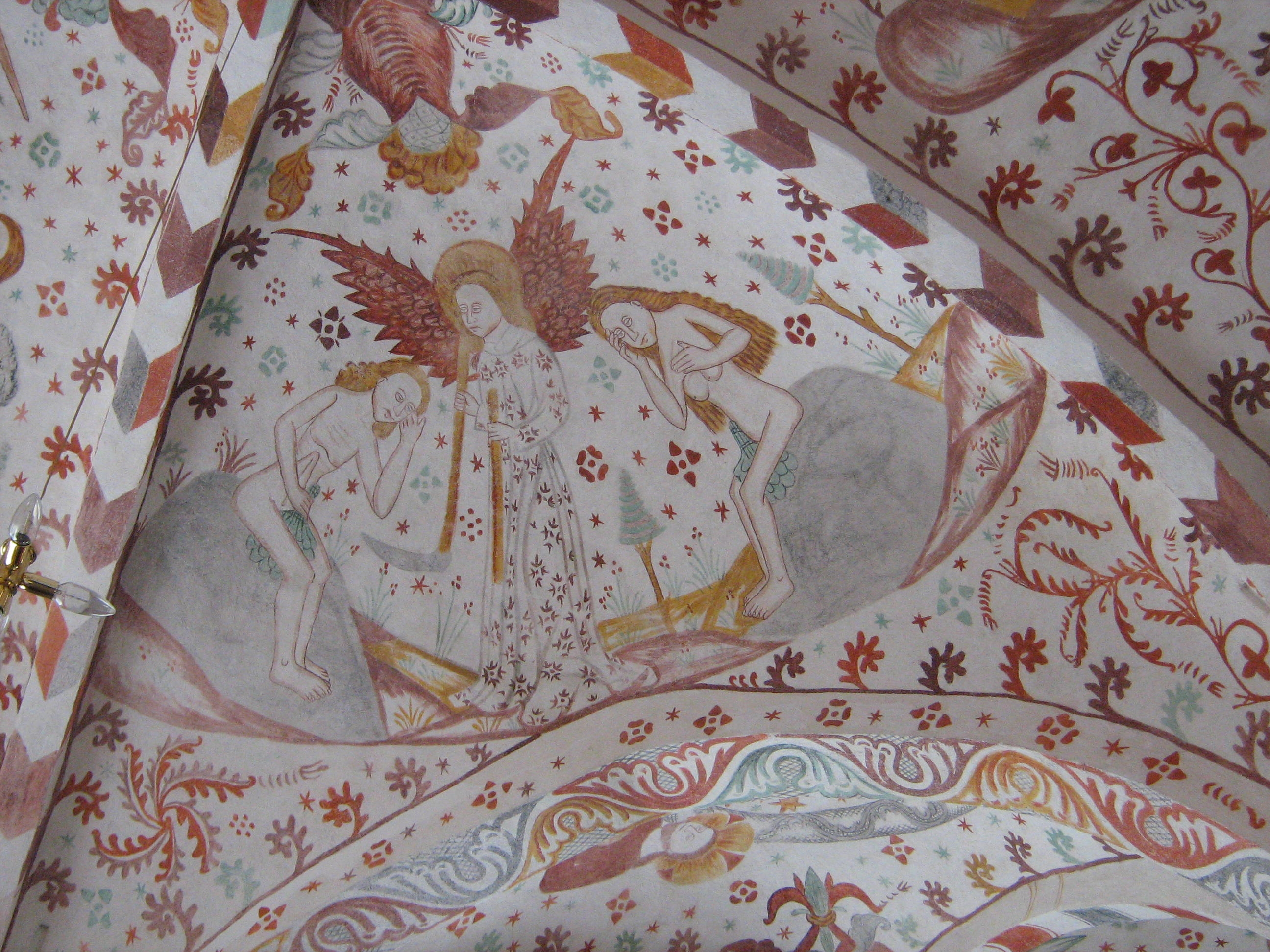
Fresco: Adam and Eve

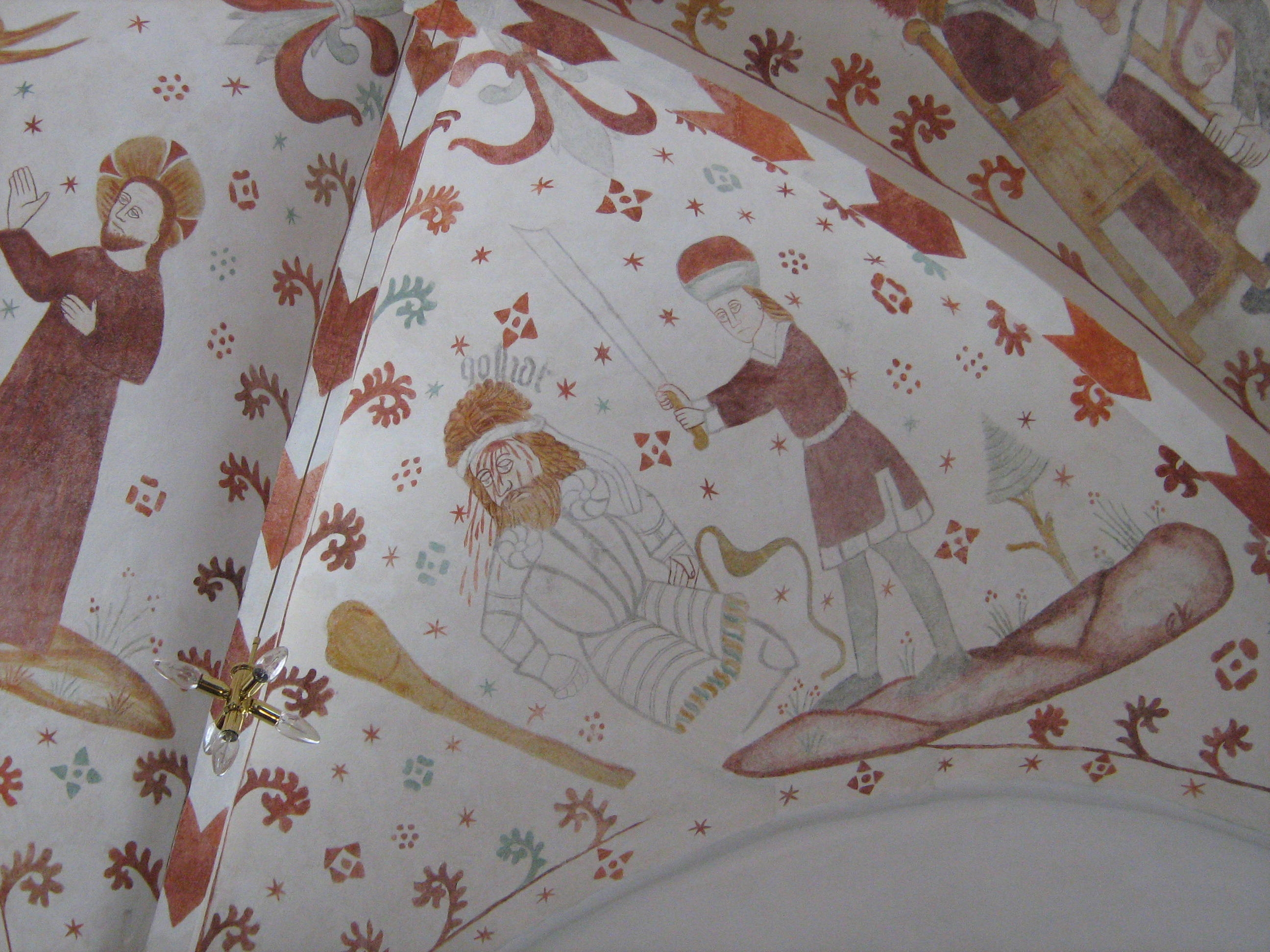
Fresco: David and Goliath

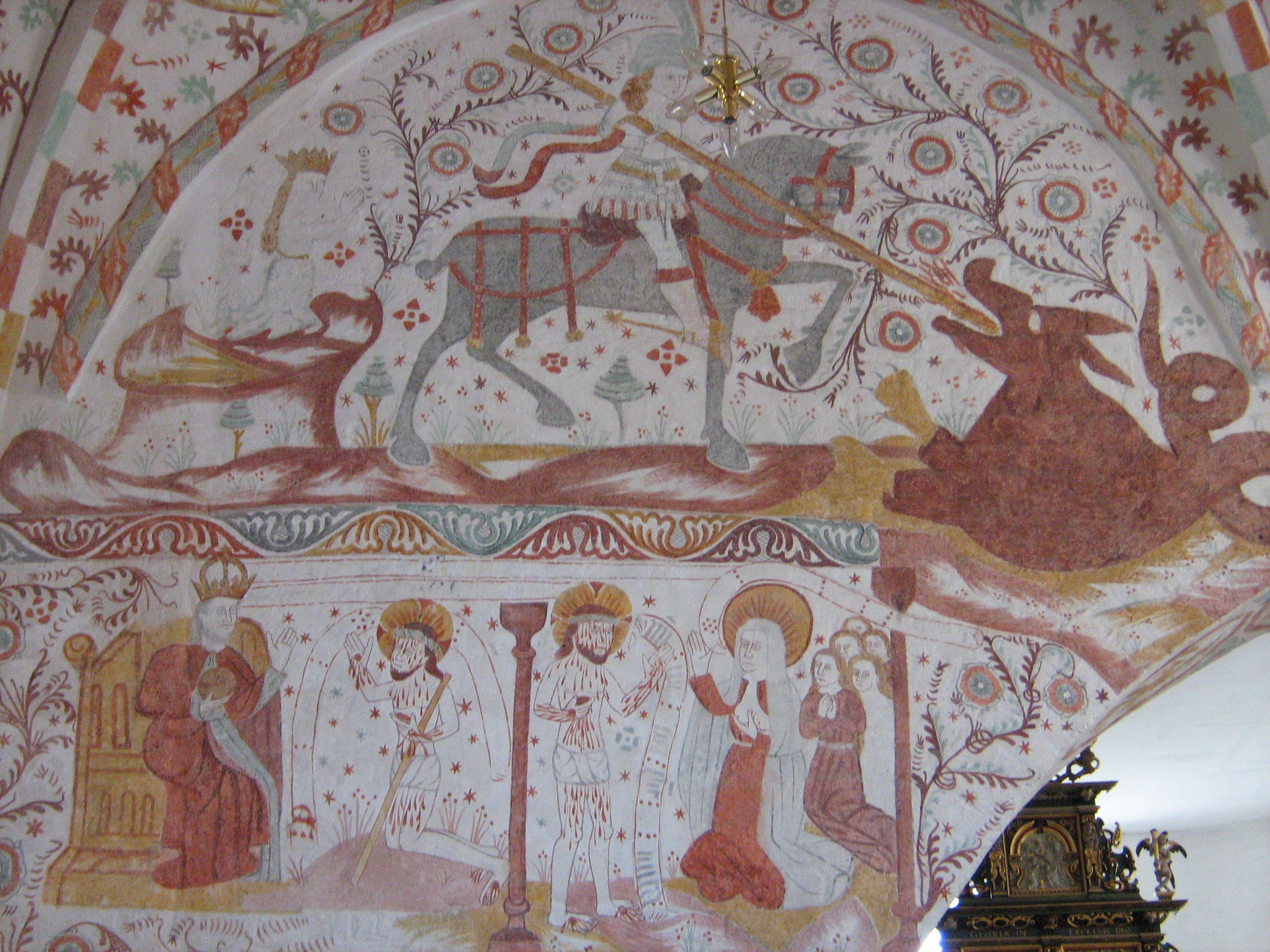
Fresco: George and the dragon

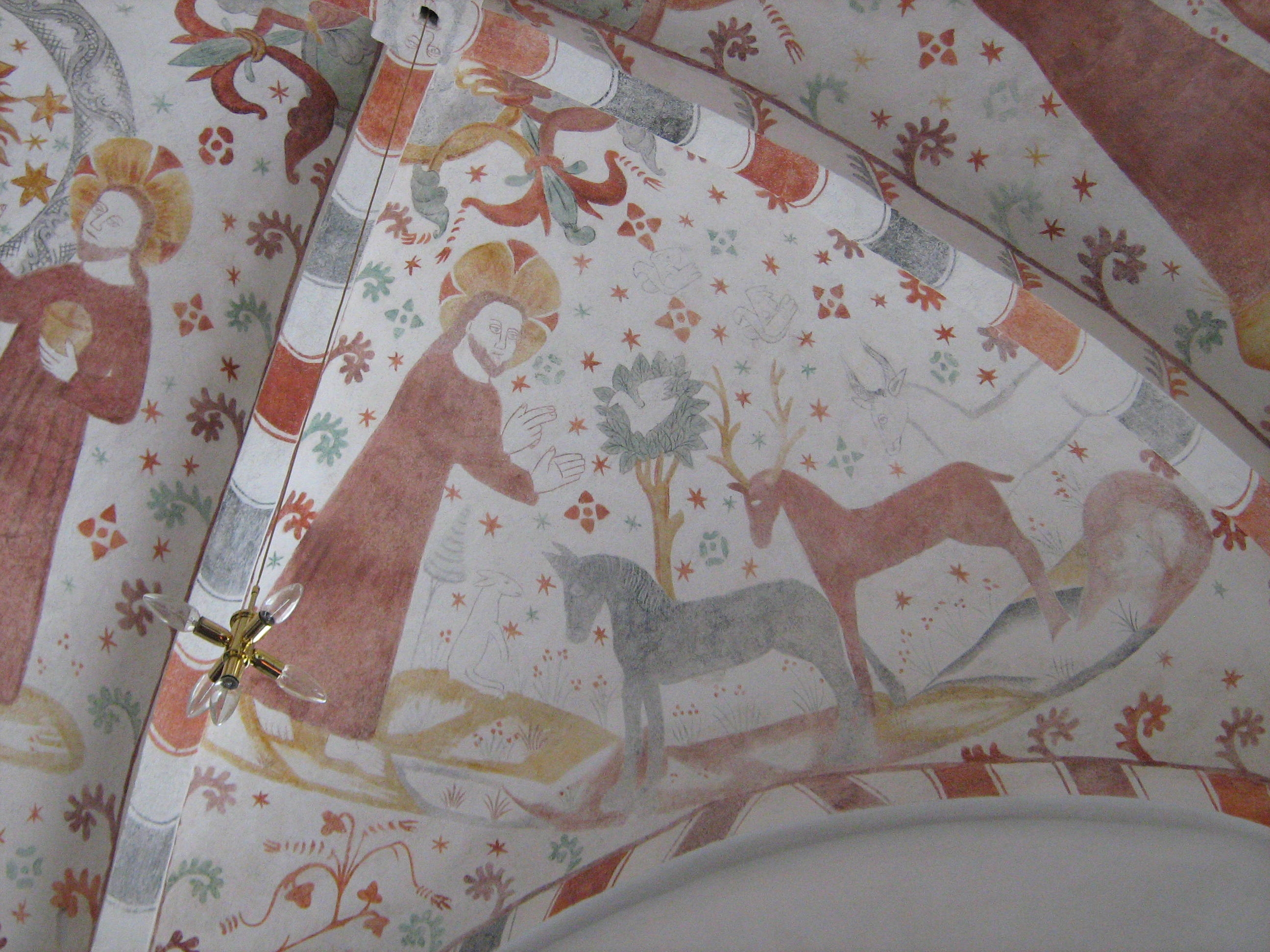
Fresco: God creating beasts

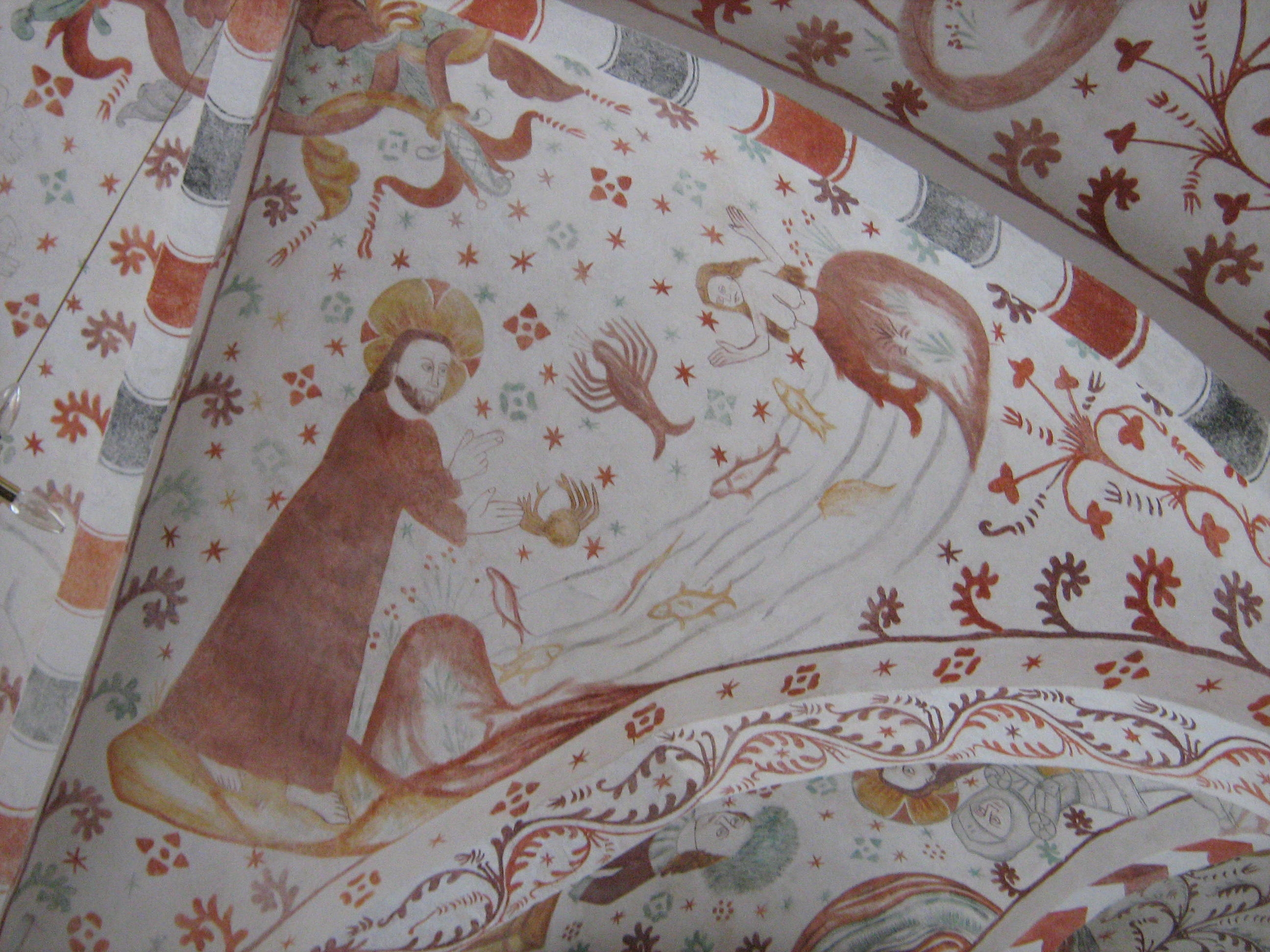
Fresco: God creating sea creatures

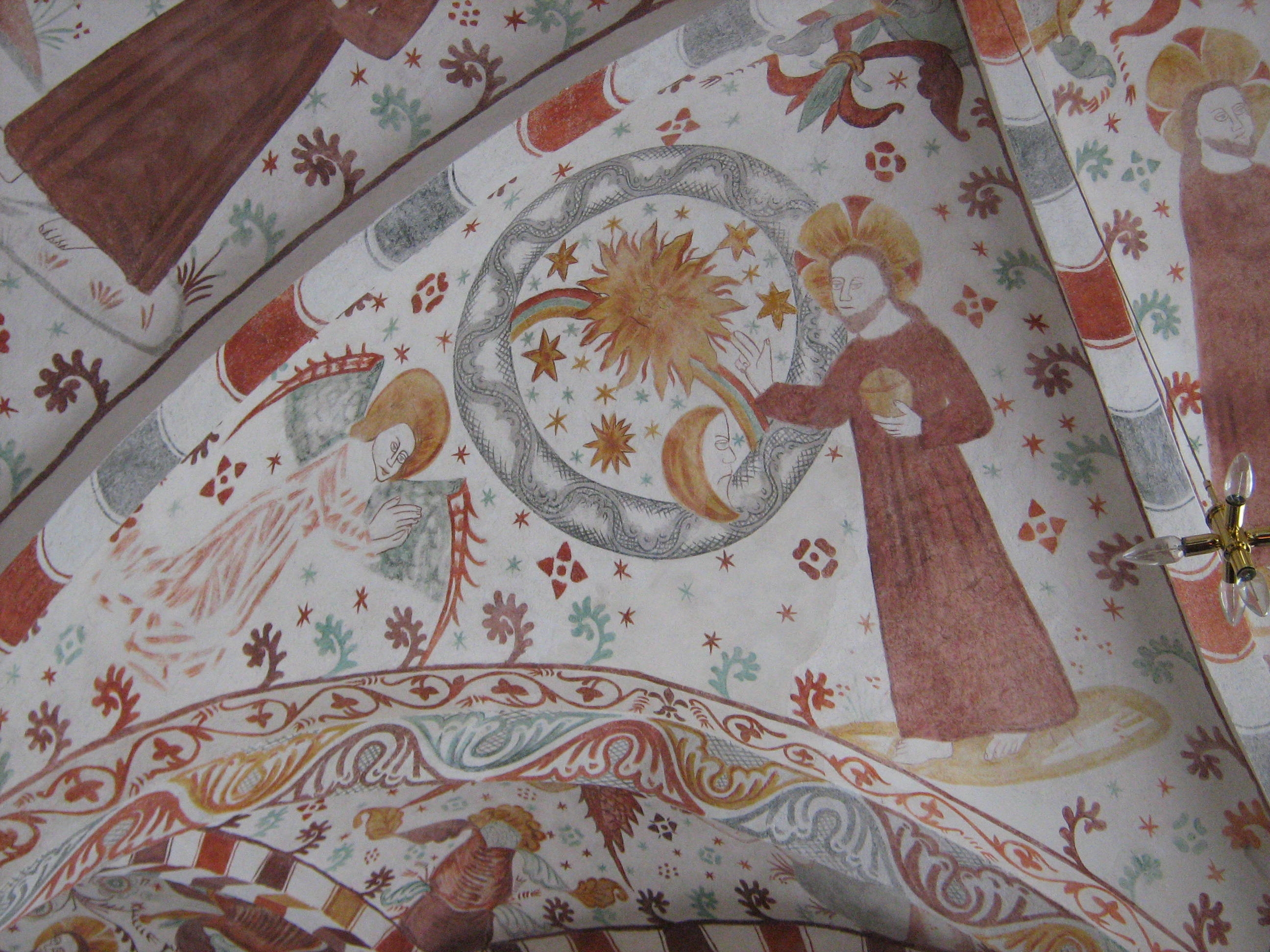
Fresco: God creating sun, moon, stars

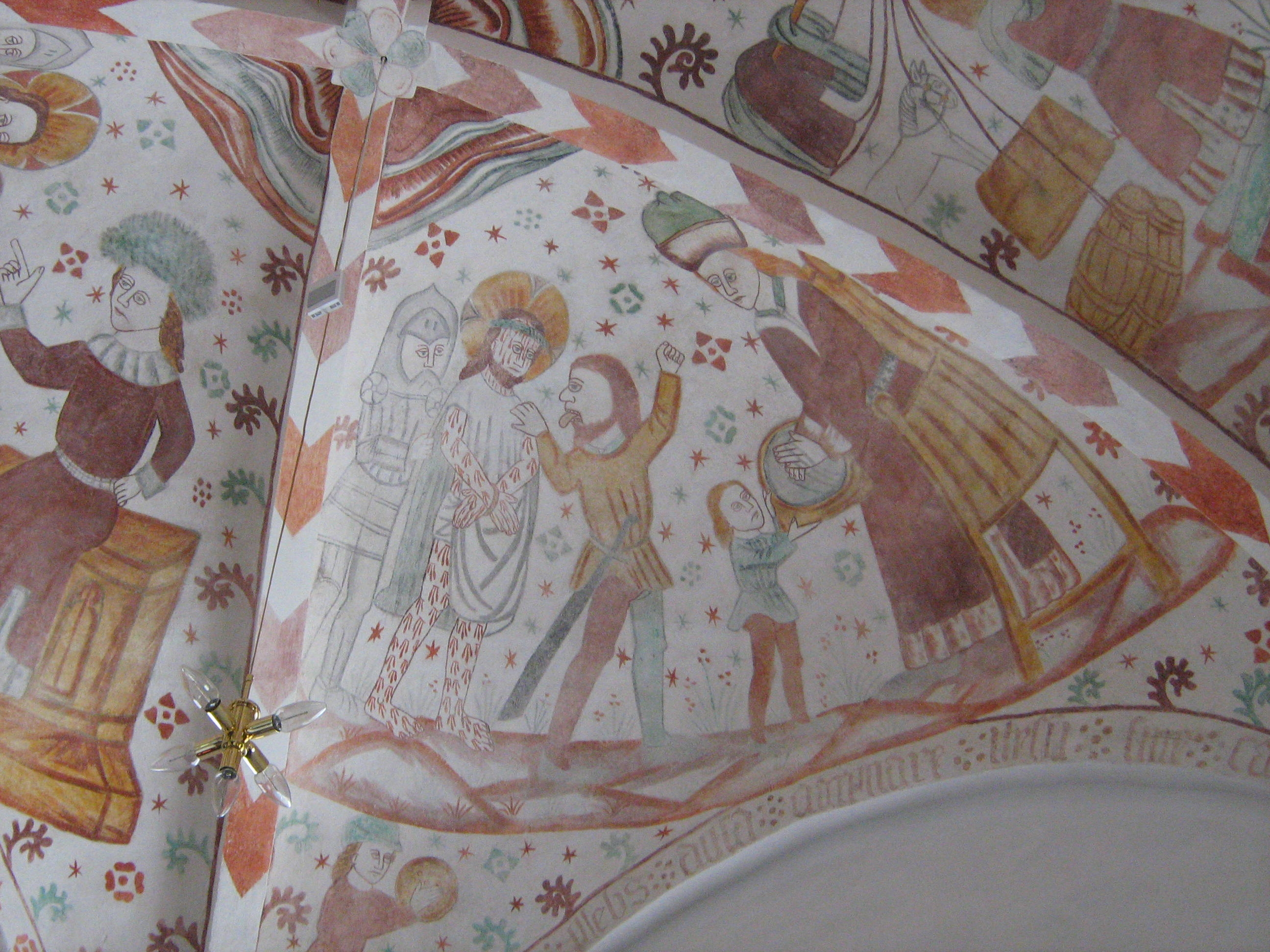
Fresco: Jesus before Pilate

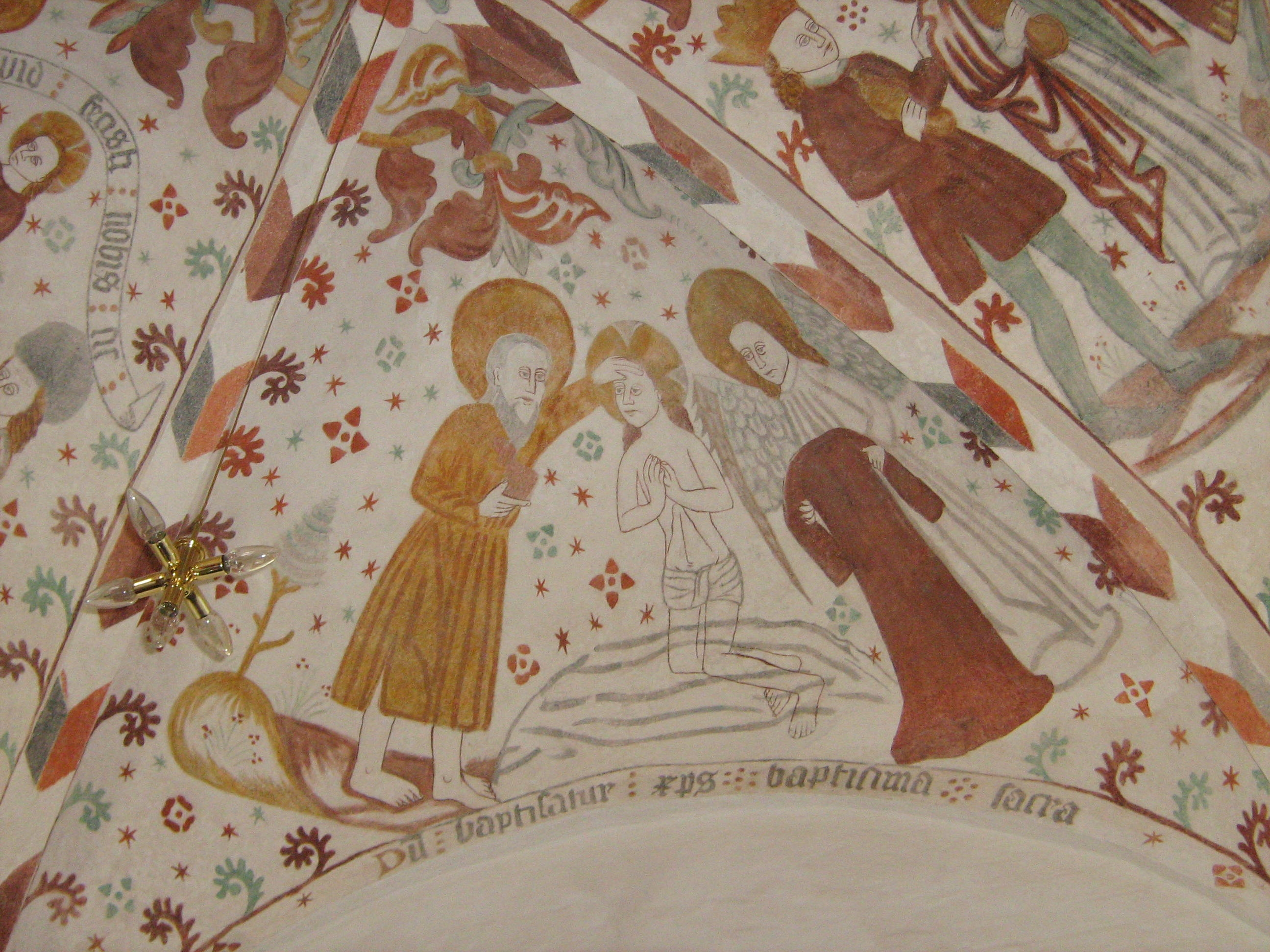
Fresco: Jesus' baptism

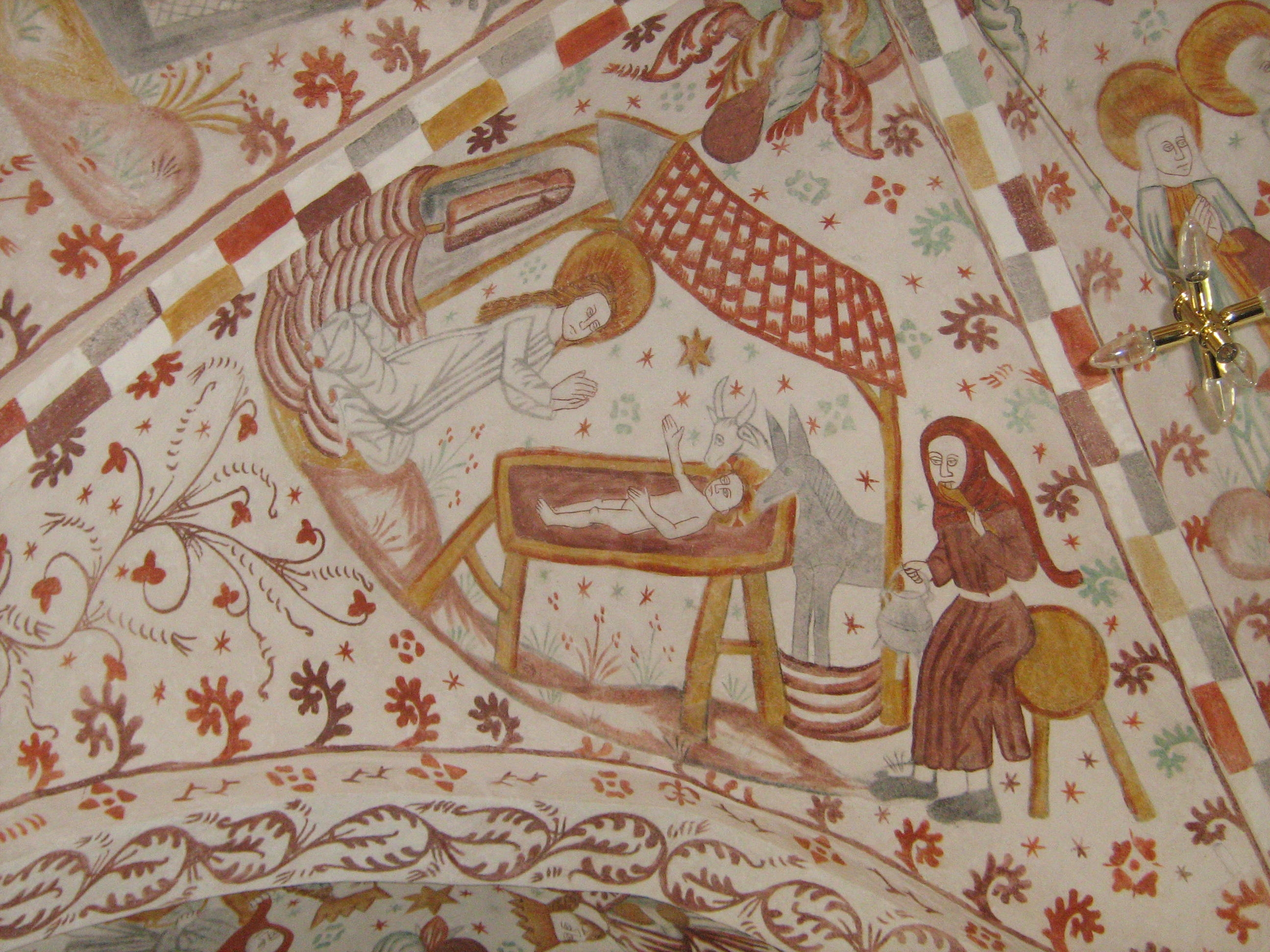
Fresco: Jesus' birth

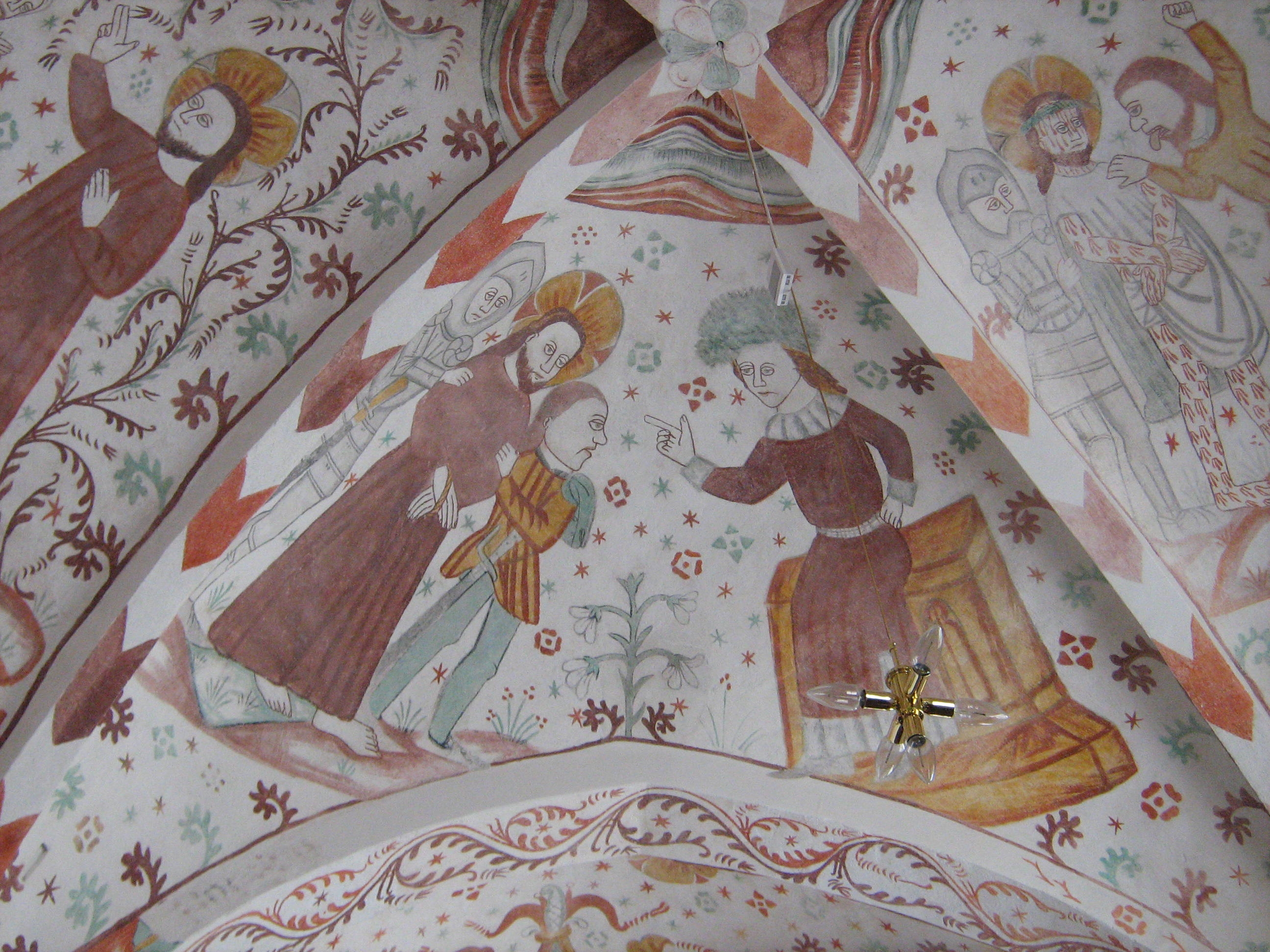
Fresco: Jesus before high priest

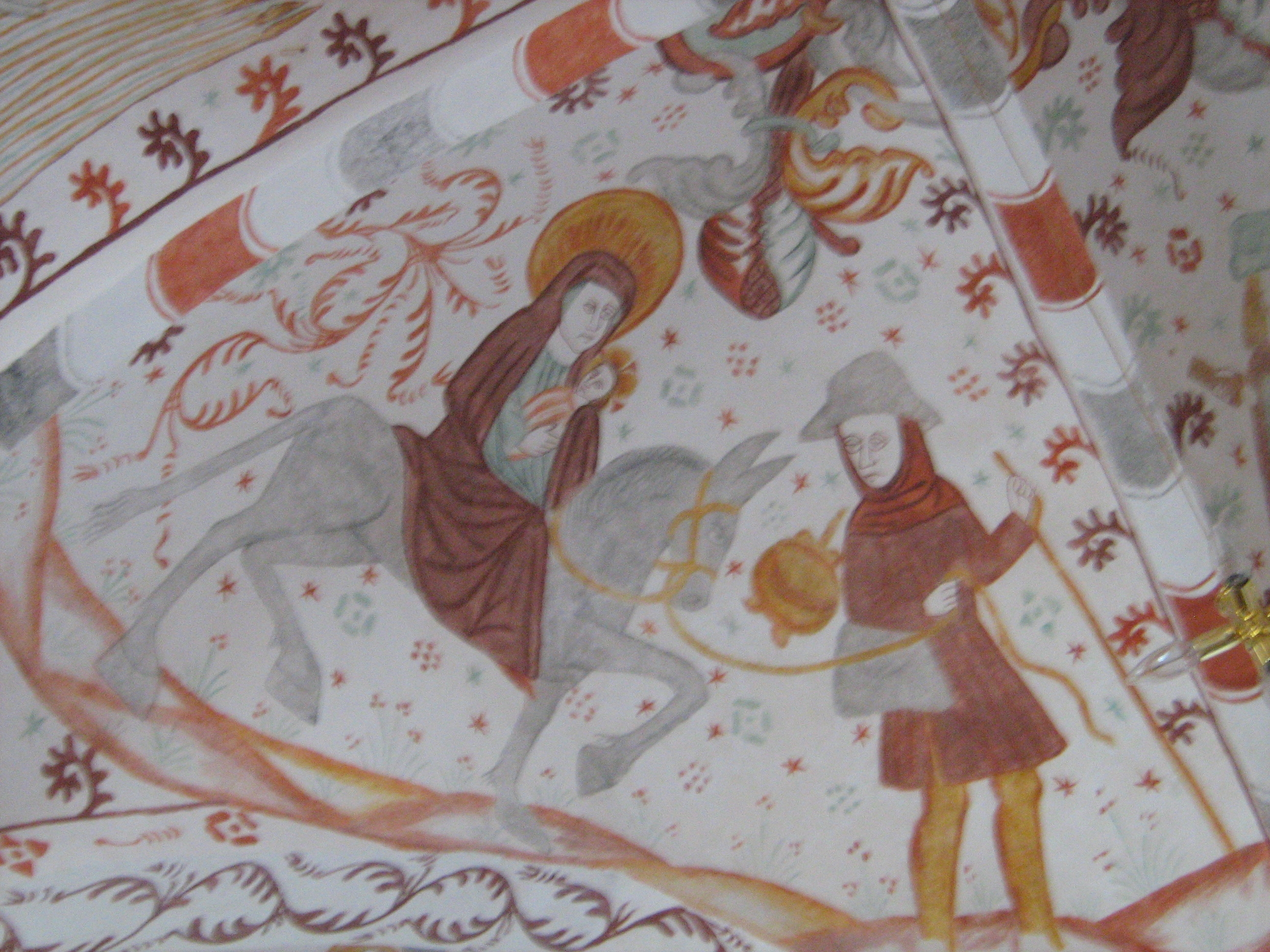
Fresco: The Flight to Egypt

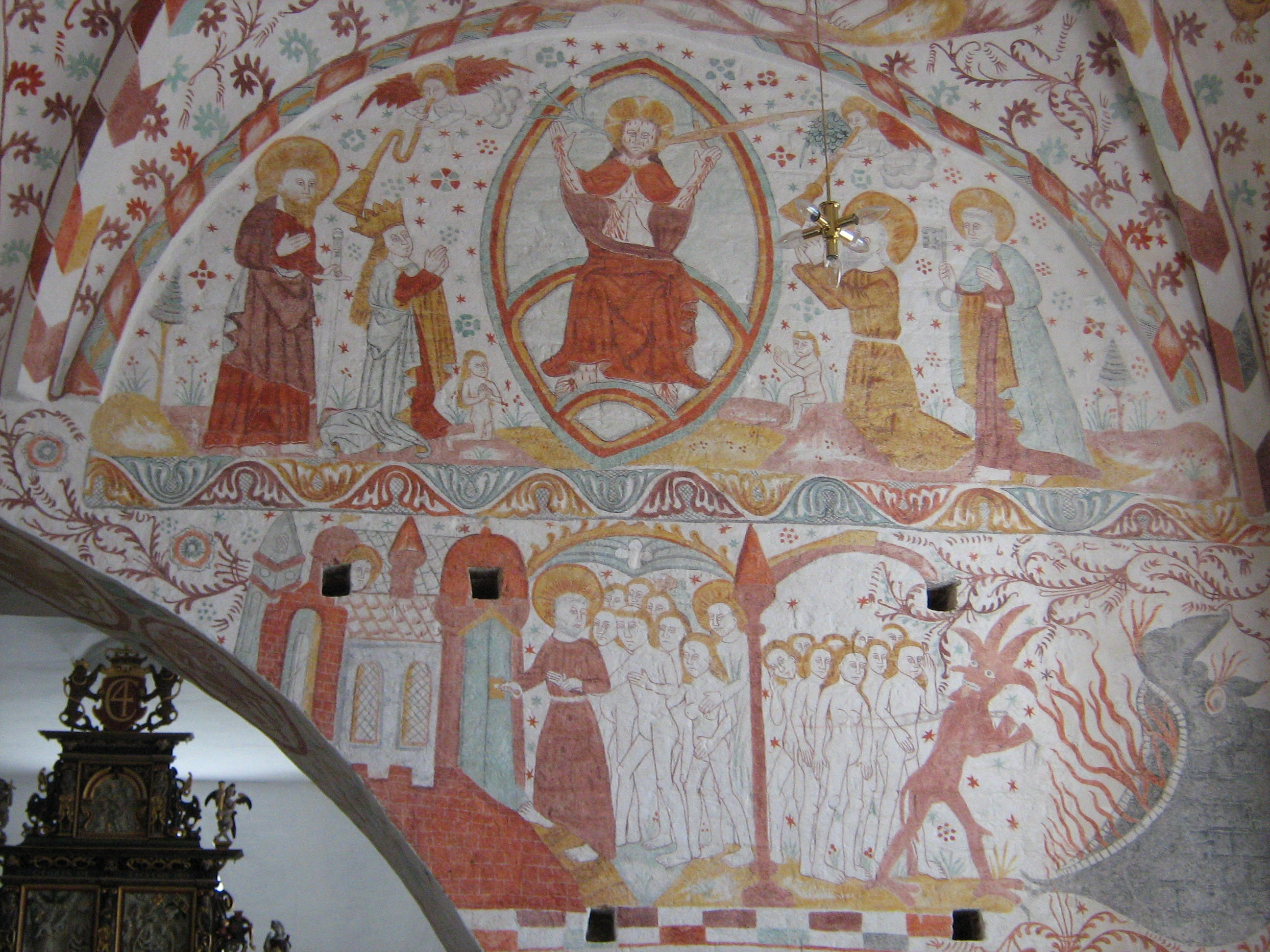
Fresco: The Day of Judgment

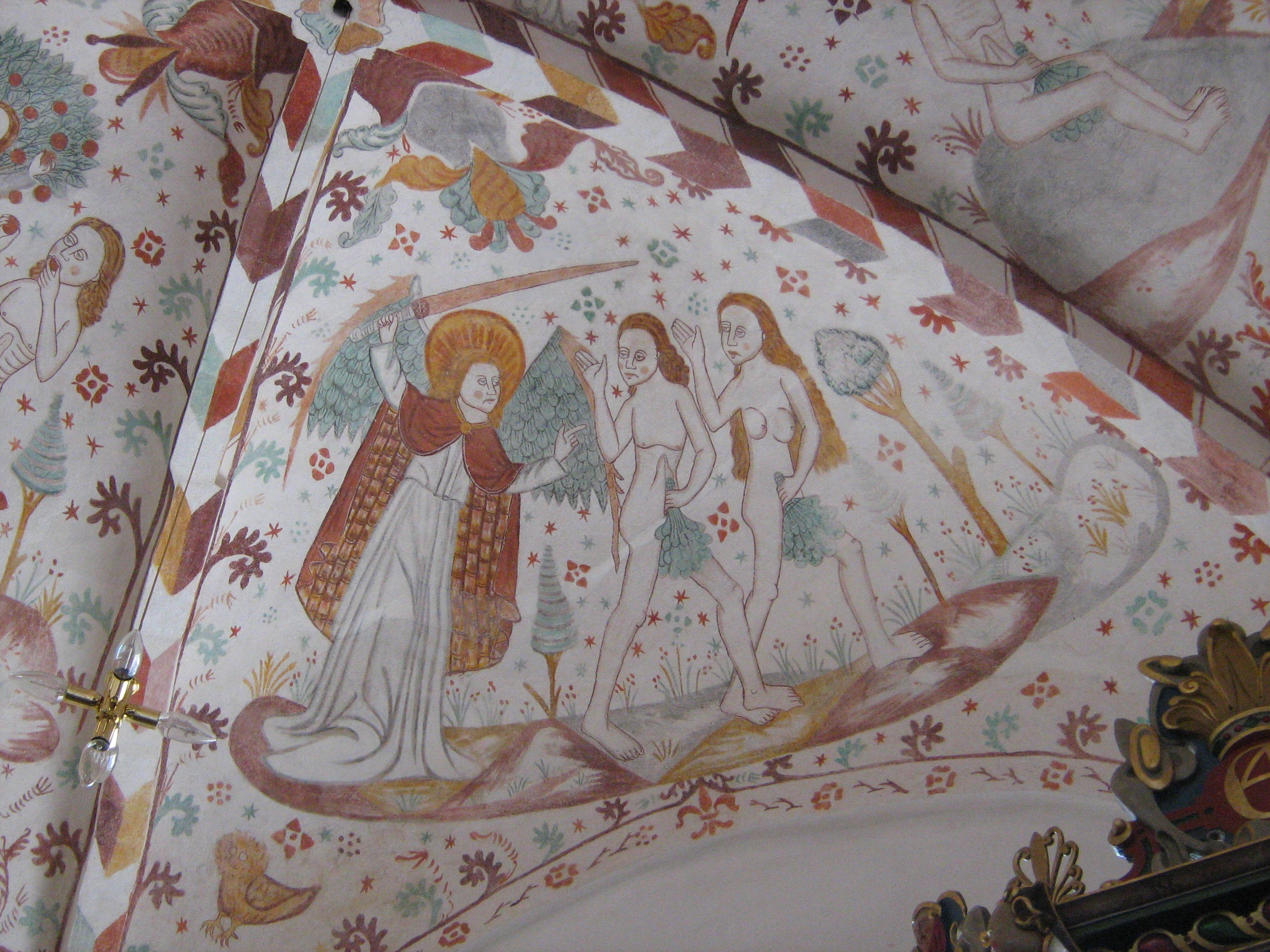
Fresco:Expulsion from Eden

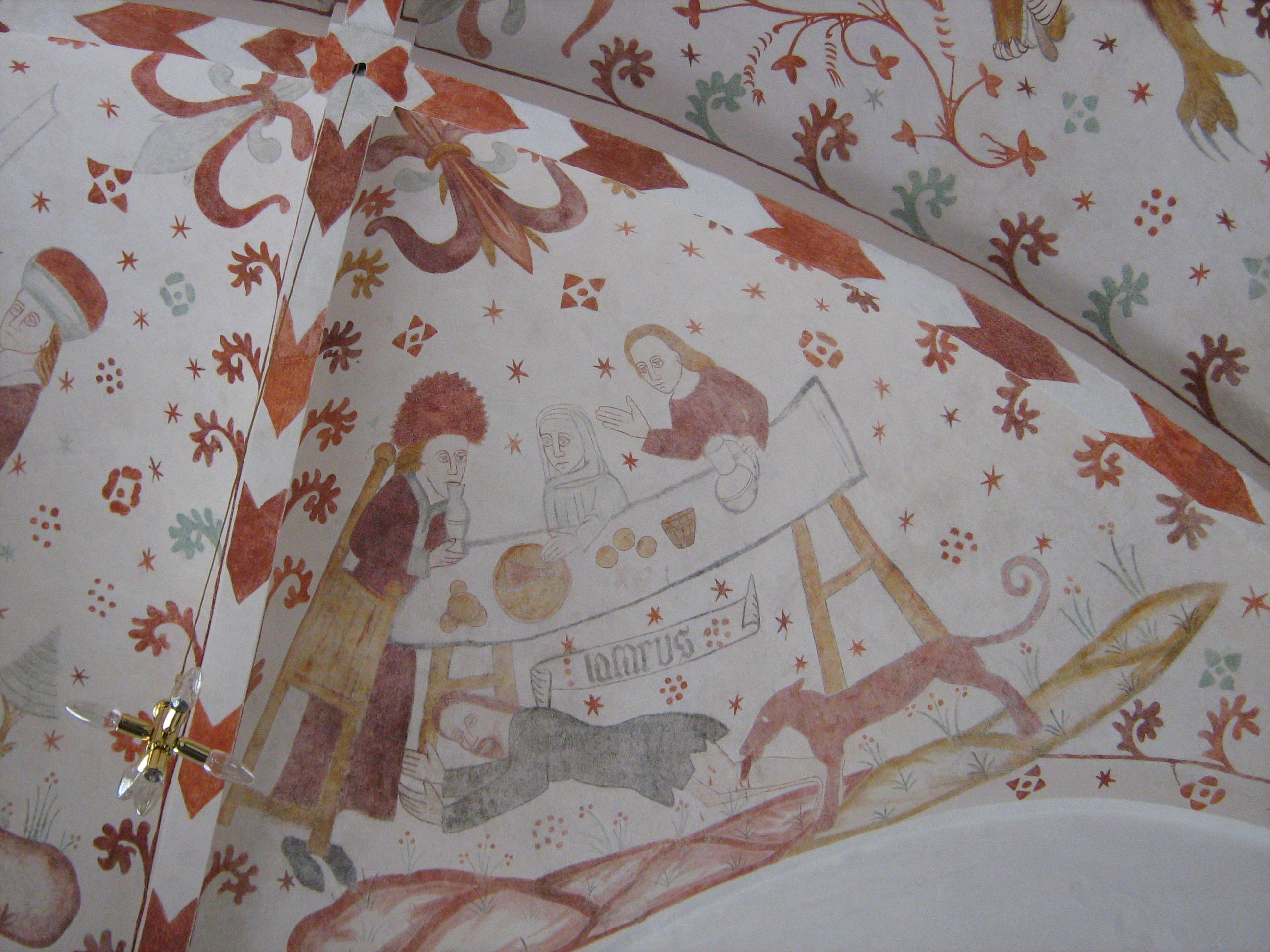
Fresco: The rich man and Lazarus

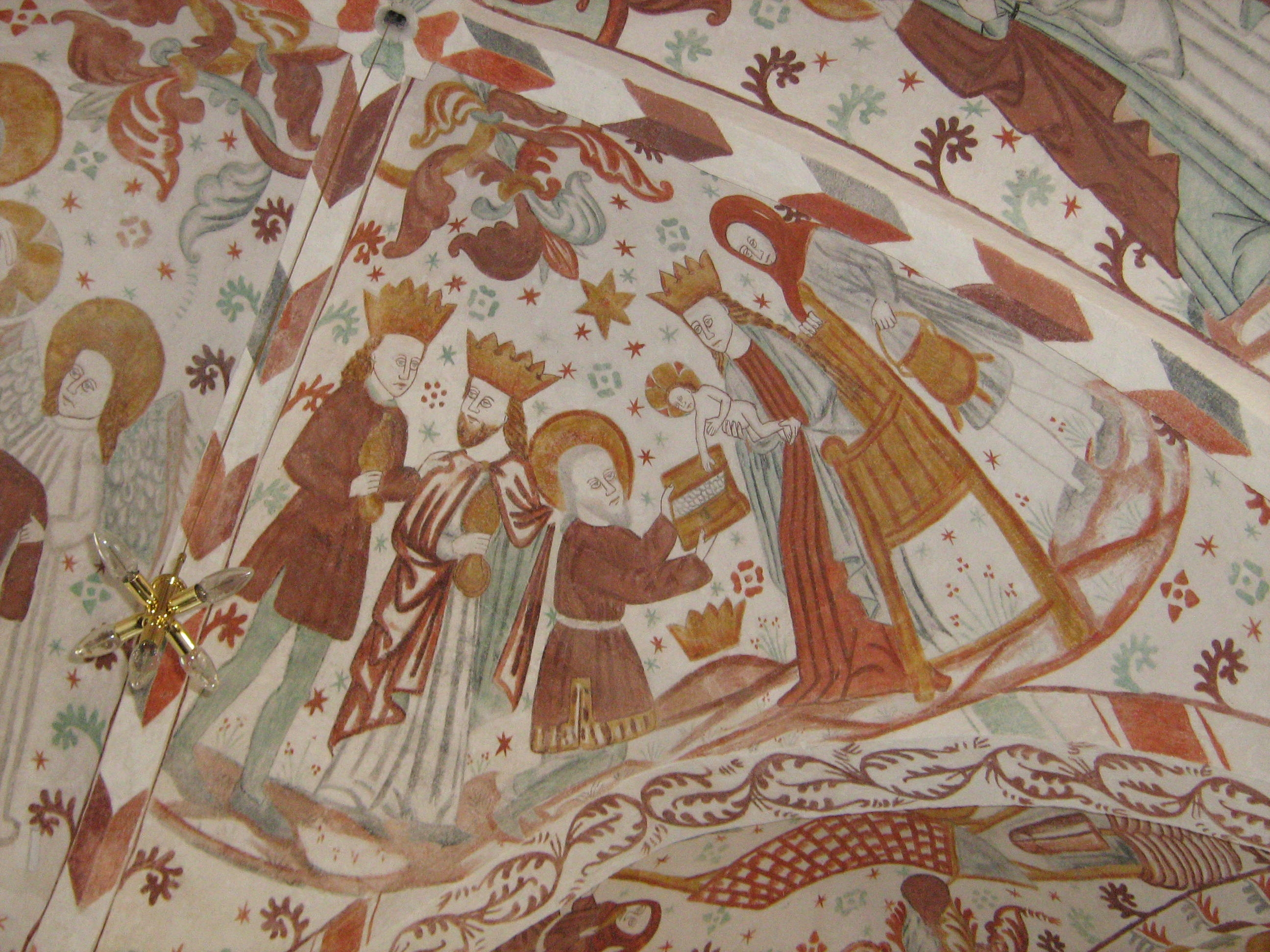
Fresco: The Three Kings

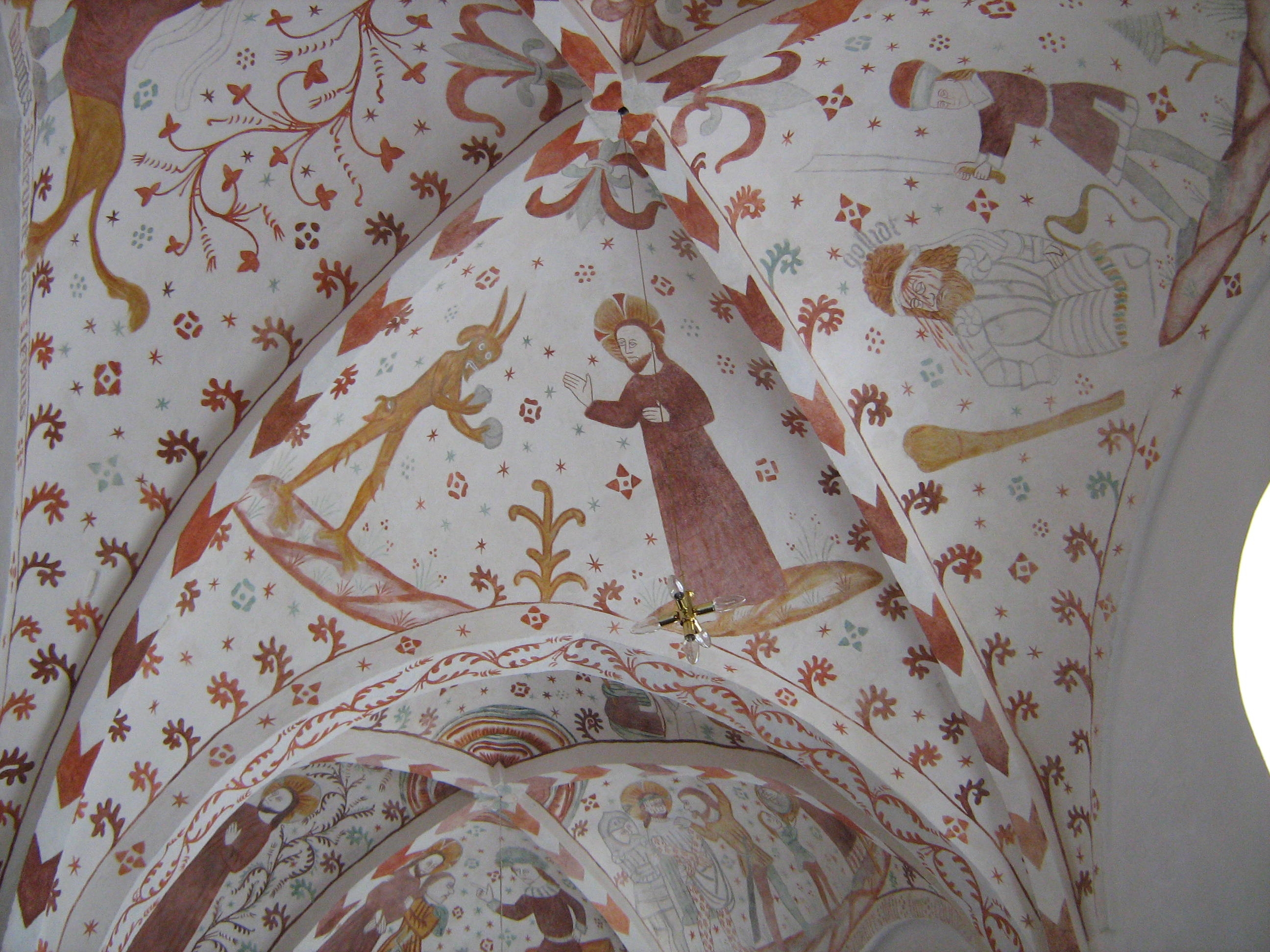
Fresco: Stones for Bread

== See also ==
- Church frescos in Denmark
- Keldby Church

== Other solurces ==
- Pastor Helge Buus: Fanefjord Kirke, Fanefjord menighedsråd, Askeby, 1978, Fanefjord menighedsråd, 19 p.
- Birgit Als Hansen: De Mønske Kirker, Møns Turistforening, Stege, 1967, 11 p. (translated 1976 as The churches of Møn)
- Annett Scavenius: Elmelundemestern i Fanefjord Kirke, Forlaget Vandkunsten, 2010, 121 p. ISBN 978-87-7695-123-8.
