= Hotel Frederiksminde =

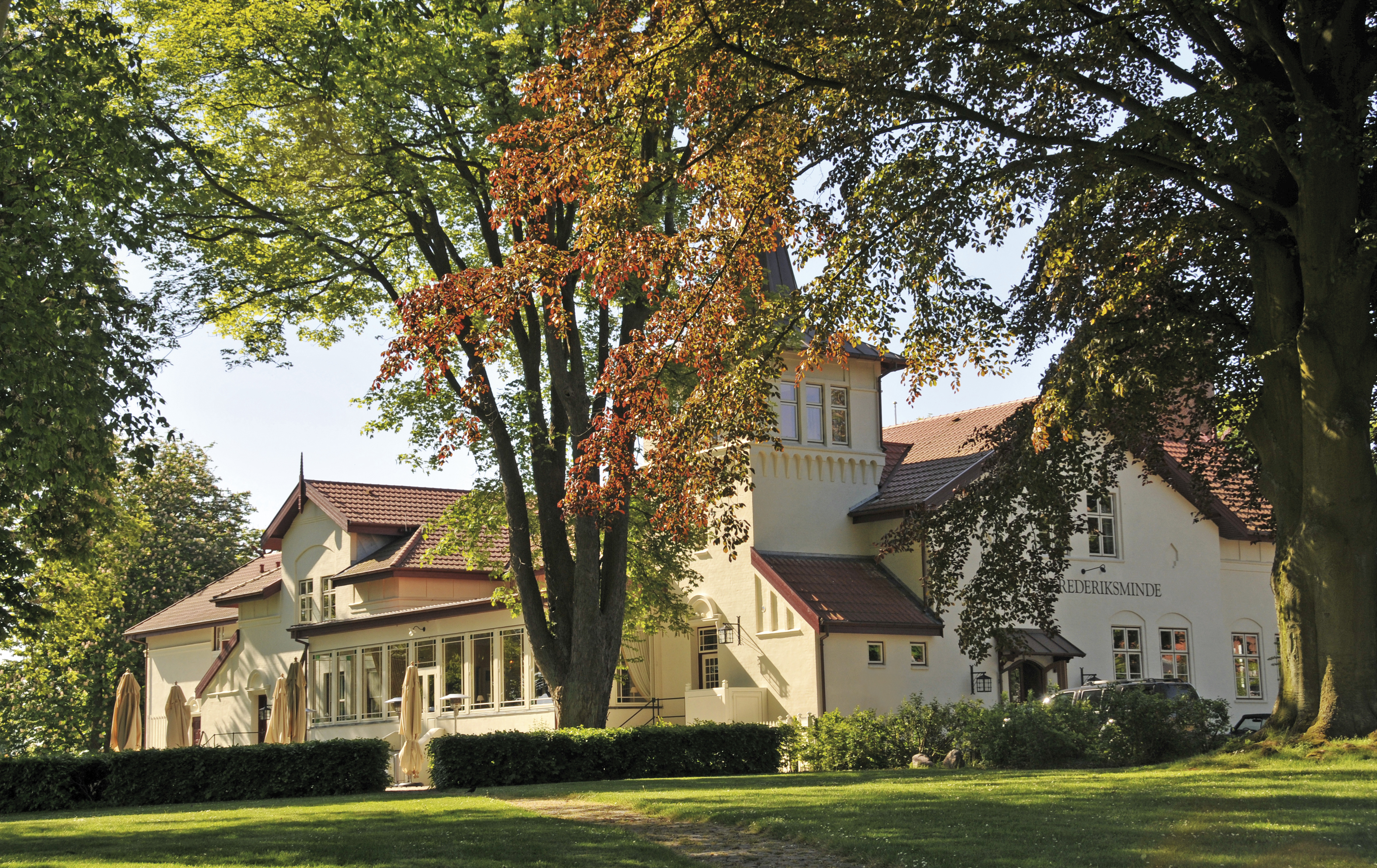
- Hotel Frederiksminde
- Interactive map of the Hotel Frederiksminde area

General information
- Type: Hotel and restaurant
- Location: Præstø, Denmark
- Coordinates: 55°07′27″N 12°02′56″E

Hotel Frederiksminde is a hotel and restaurant located in a parkland setting in Præstø, Vordingborg Municipality, Denmark. The restaurant has been awarded one star in the Michelin Guide since 2016.

== History ==
Am Anthonian priory was established at the site in 1470. It was confiscated by the crown during the reformation and the buildings were demolished in 1563.

The area remained undeveloped and was mostly used as farmland. A military installation was established at the site in the beginning of the 18th century. A building for the officers was located approximately where the hotel stands today while barracks and stables for around 100-150 dragoons and their horses were located at the site of present-day Præstø Private School. The army left the site towards the end of the century.

In the middle of the 19th century, Klosterhaven was increasingly used as a recreational area. It was planted with 1,500 plants from the royal nurseries in Hørsholm and Petersgård. It was also proposed to create a pavilion which could both be used as an entertainment venue and an assembly building. In 1868, instigated by the Craftsmen's Guld (Håndværkerforeningen), the town began to sell 5 rigsdaler shares in support of the project. The new building was inaugurated on 2 May 1870. A bust of Frederick VII had been installed in the park back in 1868 and it was therefore decided to name the building Frederiksminde (Frederik's Memorial). Already from its opening the new venue struggled economically and was after five years sold in auction to the Craftsmen's Guild.

The park was later refurbished by the town and the building was expanded in 1901. The main hall was lengthened in 1926 and could from then on seat 200 people as well as another 60 people on the balcony.

The building was later converted into a hotel and changed hands several times. In 2003 it was acquired by Hans Michael Jepsen, a Hong Kong-based businessman with a history of purchasing and refurbishing historic buildings in provincial Denmark. He leased it to Silje Brenna. Hotel Frederiksminde reopened after a comprehensive make-over in 2007.

== Restaurant ==
In January 2026, Mulla Yalcin took over the position as head chef of the restaurant from Jonas Mikkelsen, who was engaged as head chef in 2010. In February 2016, Hotel Frederiksminde received a star in the first Michelin Guide to dining in the Nordic countries. Since then, the restaurant has kept the one star and has now also acquired the Michelin Guide Green Star for its work with sustainability.
