= Tonny Jensen (equestrian) =

Danish equestrian

Personal information
- Nationality: Danish
- Born: 9 April 1941 (age 83); Borre, Denmark

Sport
- Sport: Equestrian

Tonny Jensen (born 9 April 1941) is a Danish equestrian. He competed in the individual dressage event at the 1976 Summer Olympics.
