= Klekkende Høj =

Klekkende Hoj
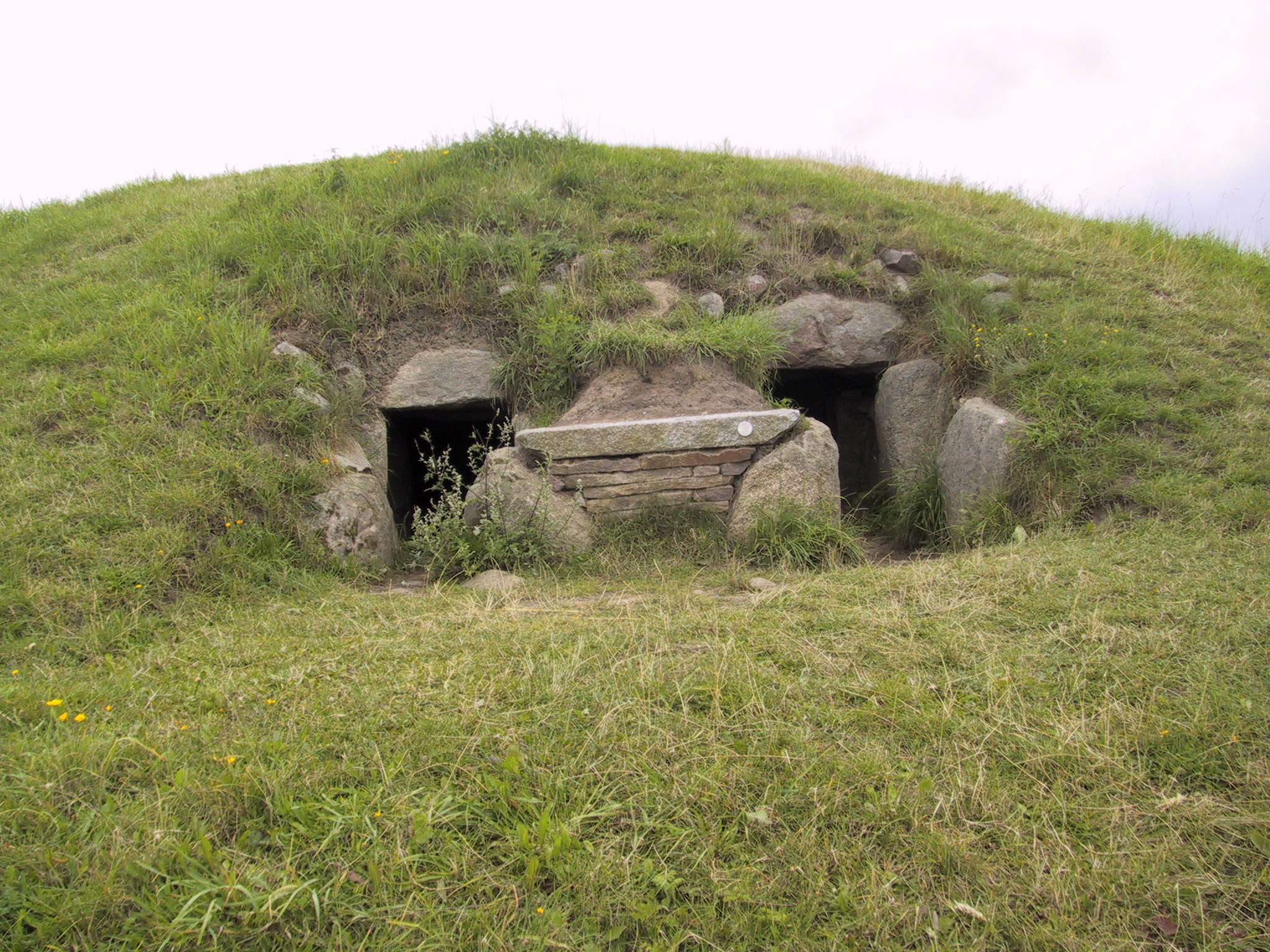
- The tomb in 2005
- Interactive map of Klekkende Hoj
- 54.9362°N 12.1642°E
- Type: Tomb
- Location: Zealand, Denmark

History
- Built: c. 3150 BC

Site notes
- Material: Stone
- Discovered: 1797 by Gerard Calmette

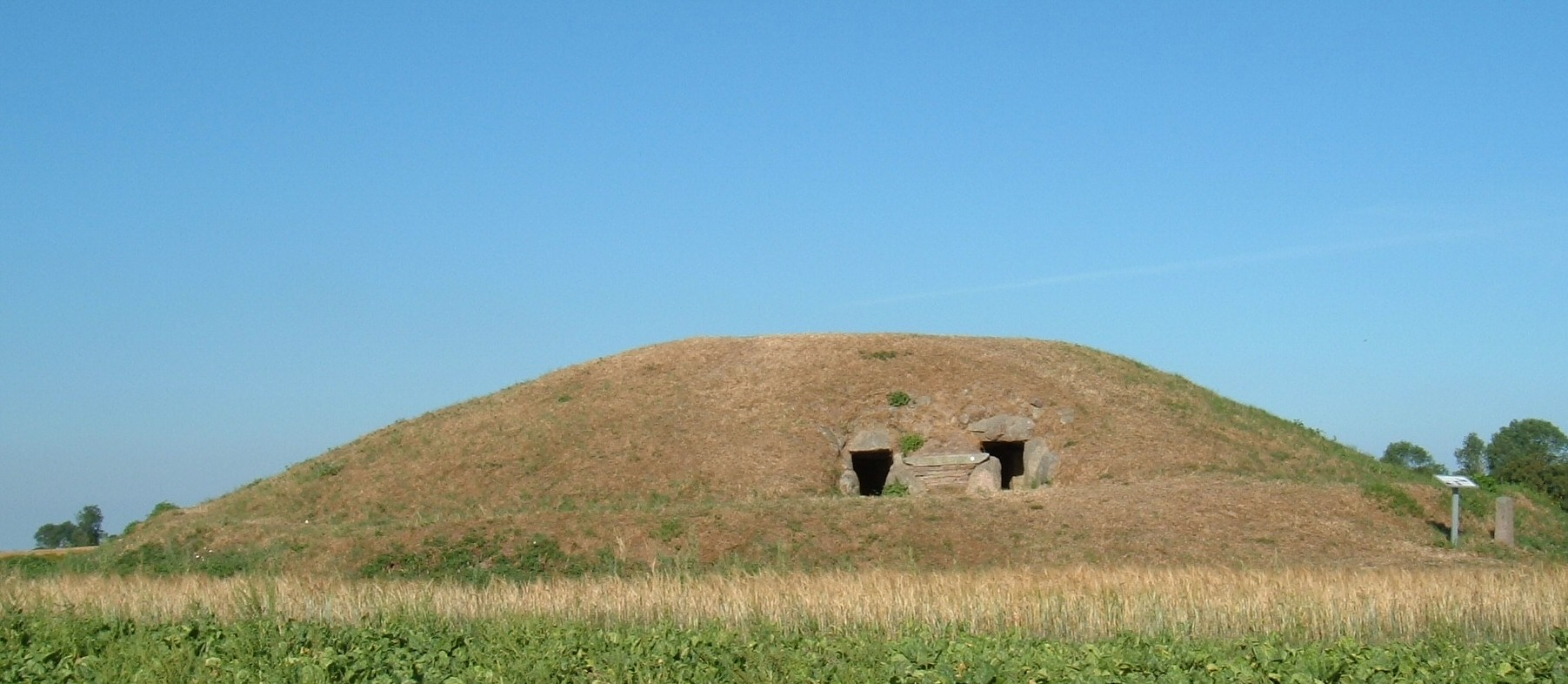
Klekkende Høj barrow entrance shows dual passageways

Klekkende Høj is a megalithic tomb on the island of Møn in Denmark. It takes its name from its location near the village of Klekkende. "Høj" stems from the Old Norse word haugr (Swedish "hög"), meaning hill, mound or barrow.

== Burial mound ==
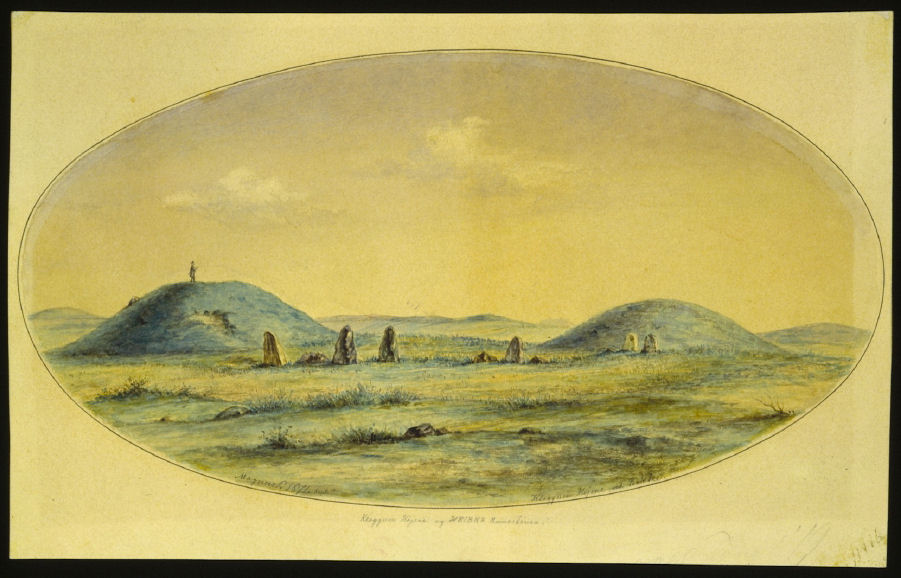
Klekkendehøj on a watercolour by Magnus Petersen, 1871

The tomb is believed to date from the Neolithic Age, ca. 3500-2800 BC, and is one of the best preserved of more than 100 burial mounds on the island. It is situated a short distance from the road between Tostenæs and Røddinge. The tomb is a passage grave, which means that the central chamber within the mound is reached by a connecting passage. Klekkende Høj is unusual in that there are two entrance passages running approximately parallel to each other, facing east. Within the mound is a central space running approximately north-south, which is divided through the centre by two large stones. One passage enters each half of the tomb. The entrance passages are approximately 7 metres long and sufficiently large for a crouching man. The central chambers are each approximately 4.5 metres long and larger, but not large enough for a man to stand. The chambers and passages are constructed from large stones set on edge, which support capstones laid flat across their tops. The whole was then covered by an earth mound.

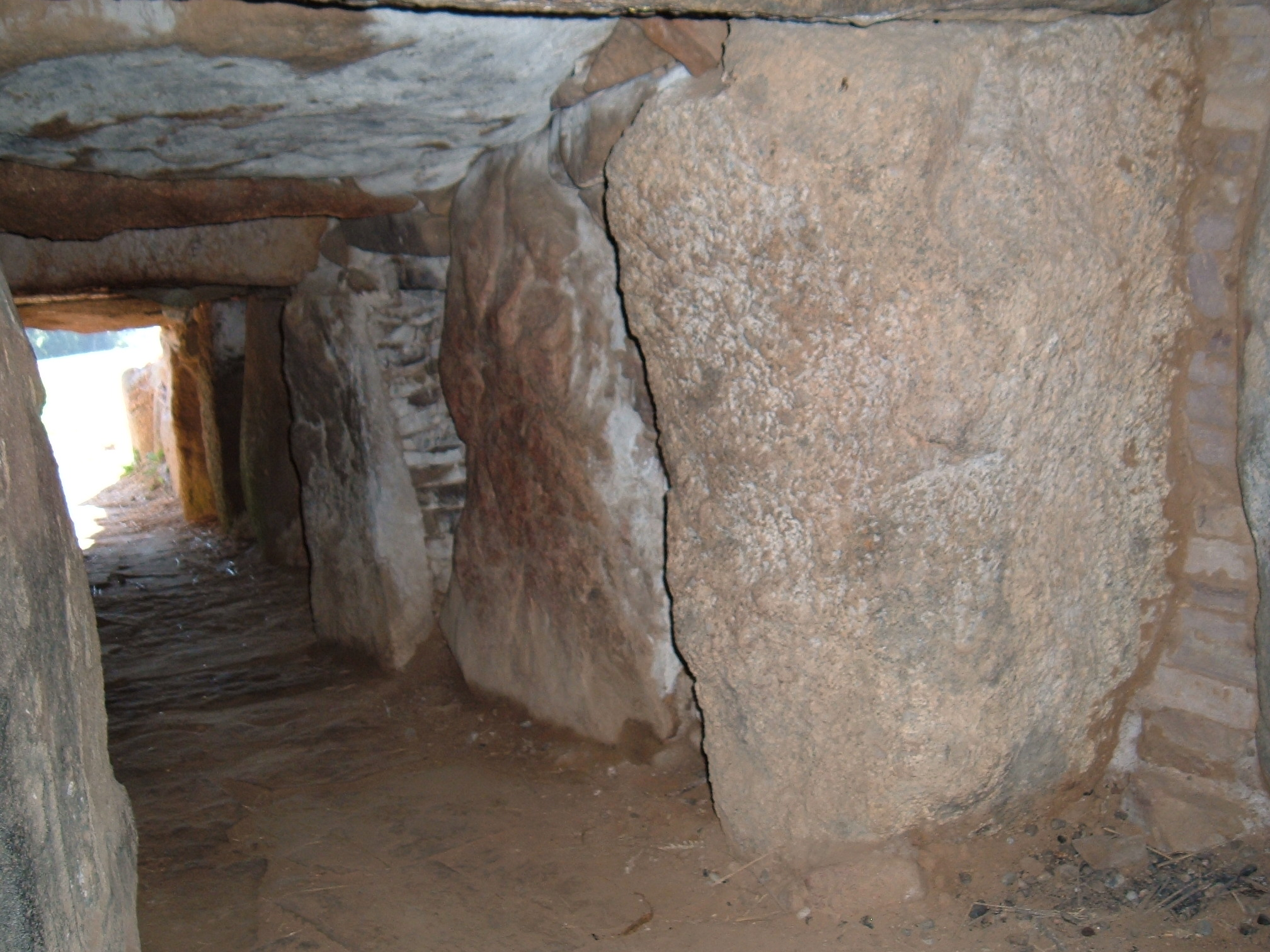
View along south entrance passage

== Excavation ==
The tomb was excavated in 1797 by Antoine de Bosc de la Calmette, who was governor of the island. Fifteen men worked for a week to dig down into the tomb and remove some of the capstones so that the contents could be removed. Inside were a considerable number of human remains, flint weapons, clay vessels and amber jewellery. These were sent to the National Museum of Denmark in Copenhagen. The tomb was then re-sealed.

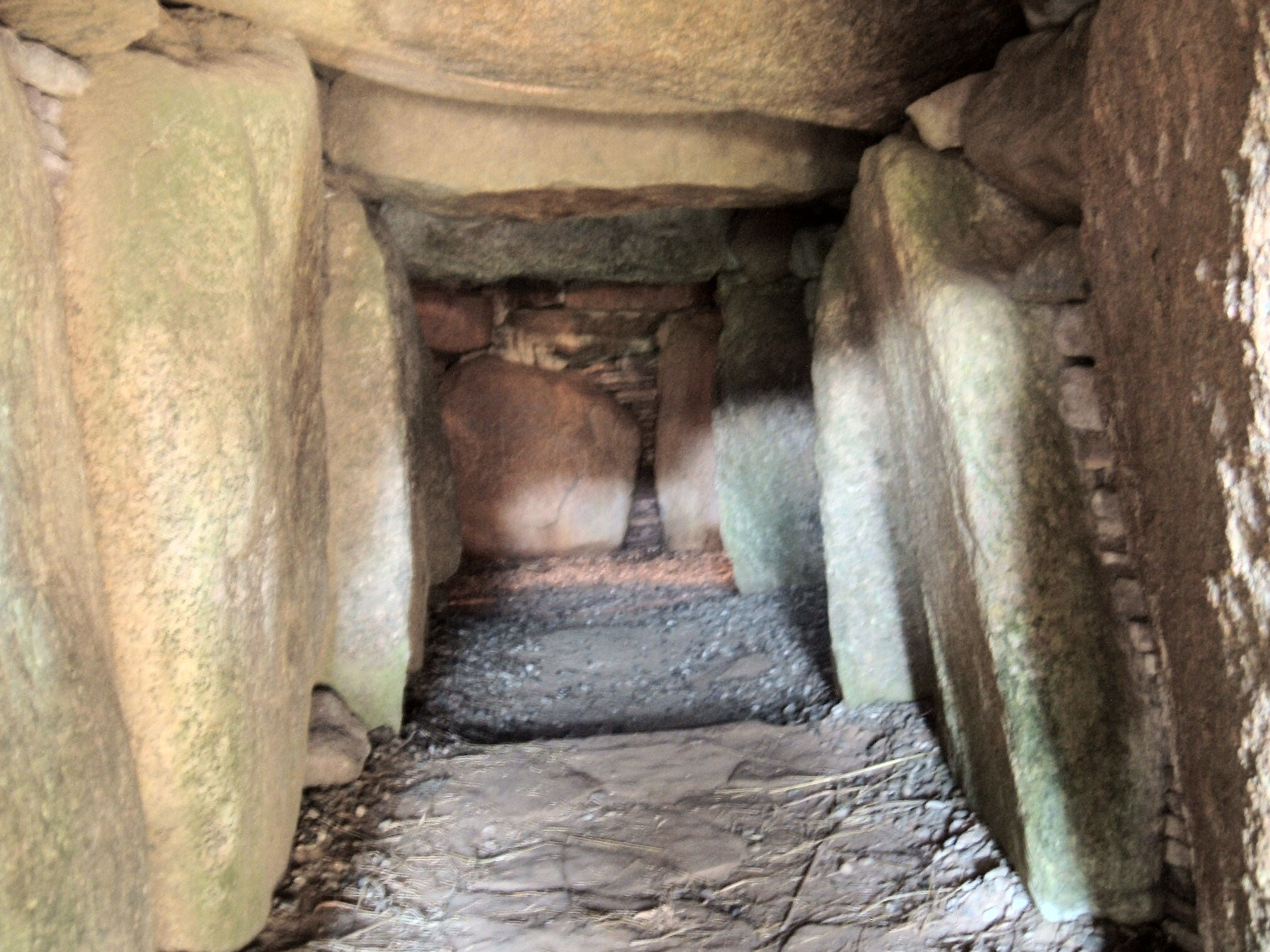
View looking north from southern end of tomb

The tomb has since been entered again and is now open to the public via the passage entrances. The southern chamber was restored in 1987 to make it safe. At that time, the northern chamber was considered to be sound, but it was later found that the capstones were in danger of slipping off their supports. This was restored in 2002, and electric lights were also installed for the benefit of visitors.

== Bibliography ==
- Kjer Michaelsen, Karsten: Politikens bog om Danmarks oldtid (Copenhagen. 2002)
