= Store Damme =

- Village
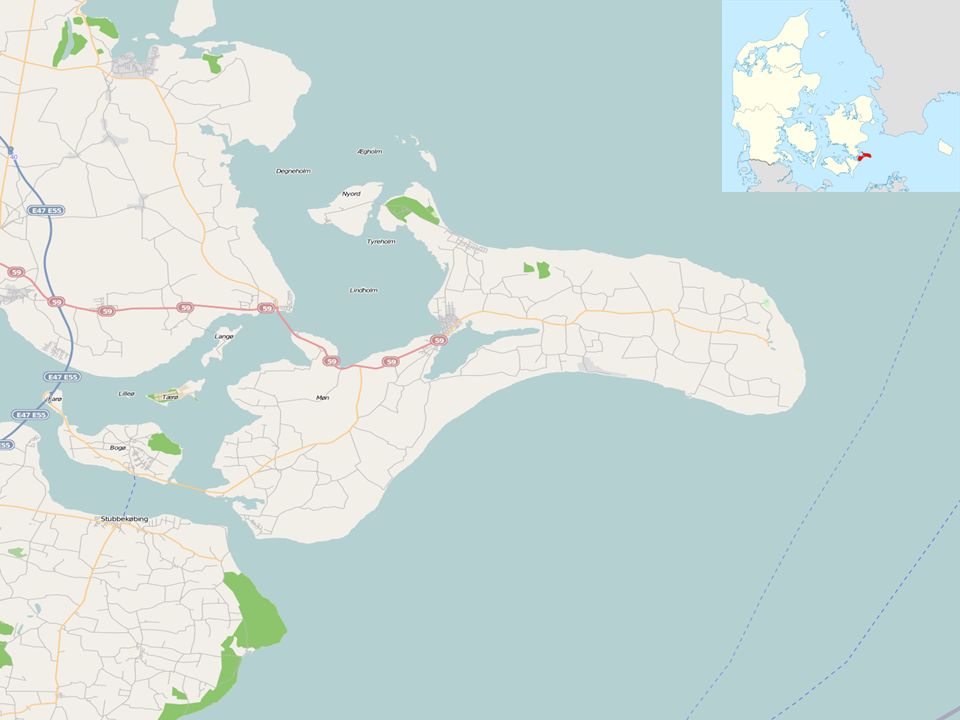
- Location on Møn Store Damme (Denmark Region Zealand) Store Damme (Denmark)
- Coordinates: 54.91554°N 12.16110°E
- Country: Denmark
- Region: Region Zealand
- Municipality: Vordingborg

Population (2026)
  - Total: 545
- Time zone: UTC+1 (CET)
  - Summer (DST): UTC+2 (CEST)

Store Damme is a village in Fanefjord Parish on the western part of the Danish island of Møn, Vordingborg Municipality. With a population of 545 (1 January 2026) it is the second largest community on the island after Stege.

The village was the site of a rytterskole (English: rider school) from 1726.

Fanefjord Church is located about 2 kilometres south of Store Damme close to the inlet Fanefjord.

In 1992, thanks to the support of Karen Strand (1924–2000), the Danish Jewellery Museum (Danmarks Smykkemuseum) was inaugurated in Store Damme
