= Grønsalen =

Dolmen

Listoghil
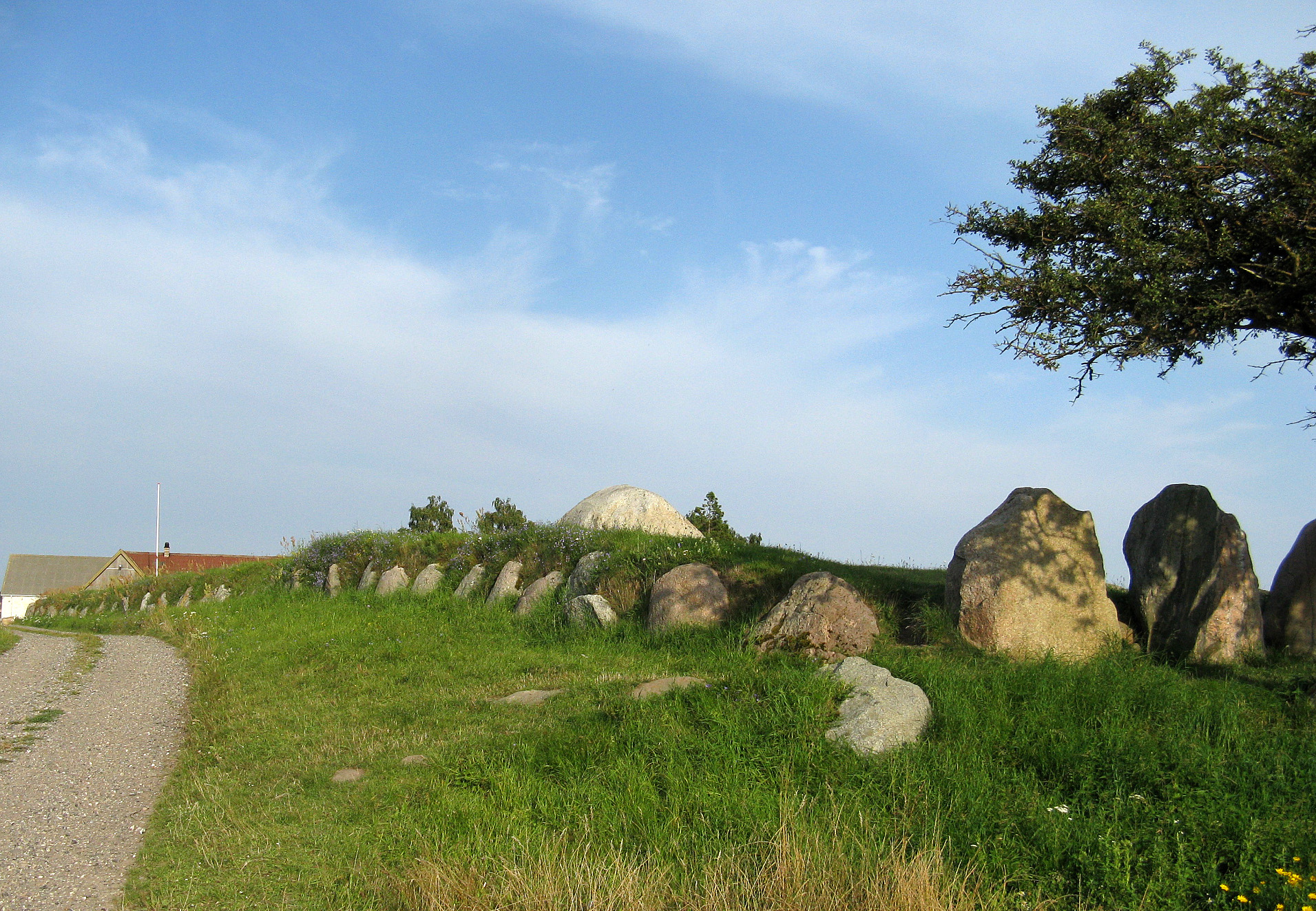
- The long barrow in 2009

- Location in Denmark

General information
- Location: Zealand, Denmark
- Coordinates: 54°53′47″N 12°09′06″E
- Years built: c. 3500 BC

Technical details
- Material: Stone

Grønsalen or Grønjægers Høj is located near Fanefjord Church on the Danish island of Møn. Some 100 metres long and 10 metres wide, it is Denmark's largest long barrow and is widely recognised as one of Europe's outstanding ancient monuments.

== Grønsalen Barrow ==
The barrow, rising over a metre above the surrounding area, is encircled by 134 large stones. The grave, at the centre, is covered with earth and contains three burial chambers, two of which are open. It is not known when they were first opened or what was found inside. The long barrow was examined in 1810 by Bishop Münter and was protected by law after that. On the basis of its shape, the barrow has been dated as Neolithic, approximately 3500 BC.

The first historical reference to the site was c. 1186 when it was called Grónesund.

== Grøn Jæger ==
Grønjægers Høj means "the mound of Grøn Jæger". Høj, from the Old Norse word haugr means hill, mound or barrow. Grøn Jæger (lit.: Green Hunter) refers to a legendary hunter and king. He is said to have ruled this western part of Møn, just as Jøing Opsal (sometimes called Klintekongen or the King of the Cliff) ruled over the eastern part. According to local folklore, Grøn Jæger and his wife Fane were buried in the barrow. Queen Fane also lent her name to the nearby inlet of Fanefjorden (lit.: The fjord of Fane).

== Bibliography ==
- Kjer Michaelsen, Karsten: Politikens bog om Danmarks oldtid. Copenhagen 2002. 311p. ISBN 87-567-6458-8
