= Listed buildings in Vordingborg Municipality =

This is a list of listed buildings in Vordingborg Municipality, Denmark.

== Listed buildings ==
Note: This list is incomplete. A complete list of listed buildings in Vordingborg Municipality can be found on Danish Wikipedia.

=== 4720 Præstø ===
Listing name	Image	Location	Coordinates	Description	
Adelgade 77		Adelgade 77, 4720 Præstø	55°7′20.88″N 12°2′35.91″E	Townhouse from the middle of the 18th century which was extended with six bays in c. 1800 and expanded with an extra floor in 1842 and rebuilt in brick in the 1899s	
Beldringe		Hastrupvej 1, 4720 Præstø	55°6′21.77″N 11°59′31.51″E	Main building from 1561	
Beldringe		Hastrupvej 1, 4720 Præstø	55°6′21.77″N 11°59′31.51″E	Half-timbered barn from 1716	
Borgmestergården		Grønnegade 1, 4720 Præstø	55°7′23.32″N 12°2′30.68″E	Former residence of the local mayor from 1723 with later changes and side and rear wings from 1826	
Christinelund		Christinelundsvej 36, 4720 Præstø	55°7′29.57″N 12°4′29.57″E	Main building from 1859 to 1860 designed by Ferdinand Meldahl	
Christinelund		Christinelundsvej 38, 4720 Præstø	55°7′8.56″N 12°4′29.57″E		
Den Borgerlige Velgørenheds Stiftelse		Jomfrustræde 8, 4720 Præstø	55°7′25.97″N 12°2′45.64″E	Building fronting the street from 1869 and wall on Klosternakken	
Den Borgerlige Velgørenheds Stiftelse		Jomfrustræde 8, 4720 Præstø	55°7′25.97″N 12°2′45.64″E	Side wing from 1870 and wall on Klosternakken	
Grundtvig House		Torvestræde 7A, 4720 Præstø	55°7′22.84″N 12°2′29.27″E	Long, one-storey house with a three-bay wall dormer above the gate	
Grundtvig House		Torvestræde 7D, 4720 Præstø	55°7′22.94″N 12°2′29.27″E	Rear wing from 1821	
Grundtvig House		Torvestræde 7, 4720 Præstø	55°7′22.48″N 12°2′29.27″E	Side wing from 1826	
Grønnegade 9		Grønnegade 9, 4720 Præstø	55°7′24.03″N 12°2′33.17″E	Townhouse from 1859	
Grønnegade 11		Grønnegade 11, 4720 Præstø	55°7′24.18″N 12°2′33.78″E	Townhouse from 1859, the eastern side wing from 1859 and the western side wing from 1871	
Grønnegade 12		Grønnegade 12, 4720 Præstø	55°7′23.58″N 12°2′33.75″E	A former wood workshop from 1855 converted into a townhouse in 1874	
H.C. Olsens Pakhus		Havnepladsen 8, 4720 Præstø	55°7′26.87″N 12°2′31.39″E	Warehouse from 1898	
Havnestræde 2, 4 B-C		Havnestræde 2, 4720 Præstø	55°7′17.05″N 12°2′21.24″E	Side wing along Havnestræde from 1856	
Havnepladsen 12		Havnepladsen 12, 4720 Præstø	55°7′28.11″N 12°2′34.47″E	Warehouse from 1842	
Klosternakken 1		Klosternakken 1, 4720 Præstø	55°7′26.88″N 12°2′44.72″E	Townhouse with side wing from 1857	
Klosternakken 3		Klosternakken 3, 4720 Præstø	55°7′27.05″N 12°2′45.5″E	Townhouse from 1857 by M. S. Miede	
Klosternakken 5		Klosternakken 3, 4720 Præstø	55°7′27.16″N 12°2′46.09″E	Townhouse from 1857 by M. S. Miede	
Nysø Manor		Nysøvej 3, 4720 Præstø	| Gate wing	Ref	
Nysø Manor		Nysøvej 1, 4720 Præstø	1673	Stables (eastern)	Ref
Nysø Manor		Nysøvej 1, 4720 Præstø	1673	Stables (western)	Ref
Nysø Manor		Nysøvej 3, 4720 Præstø	1839	Pavillon	Ref
Nysø Manor		Nysøvej 1, 4720 Præstø	1910	Barn	
Oremandsgårds Husflidsskole		Kragevigvej 13, 4720 Præstø	55°4′22.14″N 12°5′51.61″E	School building from 1872	
Præstø Technical School		Jomfrustræde 4, 4720 Præstø	55°7′24.15″N 12°2′46.57″E	School building from 1781 designed by Frederik Wilsbech	
Rødeled Pottery		Rødeledvej 1, 4720 Præstø	55°7′10.78″N 12°1′32.49″E	Pottery from 1897	
Rødeled Pottery		Rødeledvej 1, 4720 Præstø	55°7′10.78″N 12°1′32.49″E	Pottery from 1897	
Rødeled Pottery		Rødeledvej 1, 4720 Præstø	55°7′10.78″N 12°1′32.49″E	Pottery from 1897	
Rødeled Pottery		Rødeledvej 1, 4720 Præstø	55°7′10.78″N 12°1′32.49″E	Pottery from 1897	
Sølyst		Havnevej 15, 4720 Præstø	55°7′24.19″N 12°2′26.06″E	Building from 1858	
Torvet 5		Torvet 5, 4720 Præstø	55°7′25.01″N 12°2′36.1″E	Building from 1854	
Torvet 7		Torvet 7, 4720 Præstø	55°7′25.18″N 12°2′36.73″E	Building from 1819 whose facade and one of the gables were rebuilt in brick in 1846	
Torvet 9		Torvet 9, 4720 Præstø	55°7′25.49″N 12°2′37.75″E	Building from before 1738 which was rebuilt in brick in the 19th century and side wing from 1885	
Præstø Town Hall and Jailhouse		Torvet 10, 4720 Præstø	55°7′24.62″N 12°2′38.32″E	Former town hall built in 1823 to a design from c. 1803 by Willads Stilling and Christian Frederik Hansen which was later expanded and altered in 1868 as well as the jailhouse from 1850	
Skovly		Kragevigvej 17, 4720 Præstø			
Skovly	Kragevigvej 17, 4720 Præstø				
Skovly	Kragevigvej 17, 4720 Præstø				
Skovly	Kragevigvej 17, 4720 Præstø				
Torvet 11		Torvet 11, 4720 Præstø	55°7′25.6″N 12°2′38.39″E	Building from 1845	
Torvet 12		Torvet 12, 4720 Præstø	55°7′24.7″N 12°2′39.96″E	Townhouse from 1854 and side wing from 1856 which was heightened in 1867	
Torvet 19		Torvet 19, 4720 Præstø			
Torvet 20		Torvet 20, 4720 Præstø	55°7′25.34″N 12°2′42.94″E	Townhouse from 1744 which was altered in 1832	
Torvet 21		Torvet 21, 4720 Præstø			
Torvet 23		Torvet 23, 4720 Præstø	55°7′26.71″N 12°2′43.9″E	Townhouse from c. 1853 by M.S. Miede and side wing from c. 1900	
Torvet 24		Torvet 24, 4720 Præstø	55°7′25.55″N 12°2′43.74″E	Building from 1913	

=== 4735 Mern ===
Listing name	Image	Location	Coordinates	Description
Øster Egesborg Kirkelade		Øster Egesborgvej 6, 4735 Mern		

=== 4750 Lundby ===
Listing name	Image	Location	Coordinates	Description
Gammel Øbjerggård		Bygaden 27, 4750 Lundby	55°6′35.14″N 11°49′32.42″E	Main building from c. 1780
Køng Hospital		Bygaden 16, 4750 Lundby	55°6′35.29″N 11°49′38.59″E	Hospital building from 1793
Lundbygård		Lundbygårdsvej 100, 4750 Lundby	55°7′33.48″N 11°53′45.79″E	Three-winged main building from 1806
Spindeskolen, Køng		Bygaden 22, 4750 Lundby	55°6′37.7″N 11°49′32.65″E	School building from 1780
Udby Rectory		Spangsvej 174, 4750 Lundby	55°4′33.29″N 11°55′54.83″E	
Udby Rectory		Spangsvej 174, 4750 Lundby	55°4′33.29″N 11°55′54.83″E	
Udby Rectory		Spangsvej 174, 4750 Lundby	55°4′33.29″N 11°55′54.83″E	
Udby Rectory		Spangsvej 174, 4750 Lundby	55°4′33.29″N 11°55′54.83″E	

=== 4760 Vordingborg ===
Listing name	Image	Location	Coordinates	Description
Det gamle Sprøjtehus		Slotstorvet 5, 4760 Vordingborg	55°0′27.67″N 11°54′36.84″E	Fire station from 1854
Gåsetårnet		Slotstorvet 9, 4760 Vordingborg	55°00′25.27″N 11°54′39.23″E	
Oringe Psychiatric Hospital		Færgegaardsvej 15, 4760 Vordingborg	55°0′0.37″N 11°54′39.98″E	Hospital complex from 1854 to 1857 by Gottlieb Bindesbøll
Oringe Psychiatric Hospital		Færgegaardsvej 15, 4760 Vordingborg	55°0′0.37″N 11°54′39.98″E	Hospital complex from 1854 to 1857 by Gottlieb Bindesbøll
Oringe Psychiatric Hospital		Færgegaardsvej 15, 4760 Vordingborg	55°0′0.37″N 11°54′39.98″E	Hospital complex from 1854 to 1857 by Gottlieb Bindesbøll
Oringe Psychiatric Hospital		Færgegaardsvej 15, 4760 Vordingborg	55°0′0.37″N 11°54′39.98″E	Hospital complex from 1854 to 1857 by Gottlieb Bindesbøll
Oringe Psychiatric Hospital		Færgegaardsvej 15, 4760 Vordingborg	55°0′0.37″N 11°54′39.98″E	Hospital complex from 1854 to 1857 by Gottlieb Bindesbøll
Oringe Psychiatric Hospital		Færgegaardsvej 15, 4760 Vordingborg	55°0′0.37″N 11°54′39.98″E	Hospital complex from 1854 to 1857 by Gottlieb Bindesbøll
Oringe Psychiatric Hospital		Færgegaardsvej 15, 4760 Vordingborg	55°0′0.37″N 11°54′39.98″E	Hospital complex from 1854 to 1857 by Gottlieb Bindesbøll
Oringe Psychiatric Hospital		Færgegaardsvej 15, 4760 Vordingborg	55°0′0.37″N 11°54′39.98″E	Hospital complex from 1854 to 1857 by Gottlieb Bindesbøll
Oringe Psychiatric Hospital		Færgegaardsvej 15, 4760 Vordingborg	55°0′0.37″N 11°54′39.98″E	Hospital complex from 1854 to 1857 by Gottlieb Bindesbøll
Oringe Psychiatric Hospital		Færgegaardsvej 15, 4760 Vordingborg	55°0′0.37″N 11°54′39.98″E	Hospital complex from 1854 to 1857 by Gottlieb Bindesbøll
Oringe Psychiatric Hospital		Færgegaardsvej 15, 4760 Vordingborg	55°0′0.37″N 11°54′39.98″E	Hospital complex from 1854 to 1857 by Gottlieb Bindesbøll
Rosenfeldt Manor		Rosenfeldt 1, 4760 Vordingborg	55°1′0.59″N 11°52′34.4″E	Main building from 1868 to 1870 by Henrik Steffens Sibbern
Rosenfeldt Manor		Rosenfeldt 1, 4760 Vordingborg	55°1′0.59″N 11°52′34.4″E	Barn from 1776 to 1777 by Christian Joseph Zuber on the north side of the octagonal courtyard
Rosenfeldt Manor		Rosenfeldt 1, 4760 Vordingborg	55°1′0.59″N 11°52′34.4″E	Stables from 1776 to 1777 by Christian Joseph Zuber on the north side of the octagonal courtyard
Rosenfeldt Manor		Rosenfeldt 1, 4760 Vordingborg	55°1′0.59″N 11°52′34.4″E	Farm building from 1776 to 1777 by Christian Joseph Zuber on the northwest side of the octagonal courtyard
Rosenfeldt Manor		Rosenfeldt 1, 4760 Vordingborg	55°1′0.59″N 11°52′34.4″E	Dairy from 1776 to 1777 by Christian Joseph Zuber on the north side of the octagonal courtyard
Rosenfeldt Manor		Rosenfeldt 2, 4760 Vordingborg	55°1′1.9″N 11°52′34.4″E	Residential building from 1776 to 1777 by Christian Joseph Zuber on the south side of the octagonal courtyard
Rosenfeldt Manor		Rosenfeldt 3, 4760 Vordingborg	55°1′4.48″N 11°52′34.4″E	Residential building from 1776 to 1777 by Christian Joseph Zuber on the northeastern side of the octagonal courtyard
Snertingegård		Fæbyvej 121, 4760 Vordingborg	55°3′50.35″N 11°55′9.83″E	Main building from 1857 by Ferdinand Meldahl
Snertingegård		Fæbyvej 121, 4760 Vordingborg	55°3′50.35″N 11°55′9.83″E	
Snertingegård		Fæbyvej 123, 4760 Vordingborg	55°3′51.41″N 11°55′9.83″E	
Vordingborg Town Hall		Algade 97, 4760 Vordingborg		
Ørslev Kirkelade		Ørslevvej 134, 4760 Vordingborg		

=== 4772 Langebæk ===
Listing name	Image	Location	Coordinates	Description
Ore Lighthouse		Petersværft 4, 4772 Langebæk	55°0′24.7″N 11°52′11.3″E	
Petersgaard		Petersgaard Alle 3, 4772 Langebæk	55°0′10.88″N 12°6′10.94″E	Lighthouse from 1895 by Theodor Wedén
Petersværft 2: Skovfogedstedet		Petersværft 2, 4772 Langebæk	54°58′14.21″N 12°4′28.61″E	One-storey, thatched house from 1905 which was extended in 1916, probably by Viggo Dahl
Petersværft 2: Skovfogedstedet		Petersværft 2, 4772 Langebæk	54°58′14.21″N 12°4′28.61″E	One-storey, thatched outbuilding
Petersværft 3: Skovridergården		Petersværft 2, 4772 Langebæk	54°58′15.38″N 12°4′33.63″E	One-storey, L-shaped brick building with tile roof from c. 1800 which was adapted in 1928
Petersværft 3: Skovridergården		Petersværft 2, 4772 Langebæk	54°58′15.38″N 12°4′33.63″E	L-shaped, half-timbered, thatched barn from c. 1800
Petersværft 4: Officershuset		Petersværft 4, 4772 Langebæk	54°58′19.31″N 12°4′41.87″E	One-storey, L-shaped brick building with half hipped red tile roof over high cellar from 1807 which was expanded in 1885 and again in 1903
Petersværft 5: Skovkuskeboligen og Den gl. Forpagterbolig, Petersværft		Petersværft 5A, 4772 Langebæk	54°58′15.7″N 12°4′34.91″E	One-storey, thatched house with half-timbered gables from the late 18th century

=== 4791 Borre ===
Listing name	Image	Location	Coordinates	Description
Magleby Rectory		Klintevej 502, 4791 Borre	54°59′2.26″N 12°29′5.57″E	Residential wing from 1849
Magleby Rectory		Klintevej 502, 4791 Borre	54°59′2.26″N 12°29′5.57″E	Attached outbuilding from 1849
Magleby Rectory		Klintevej 502, 4791 Borre	54°59′2.26″N 12°29′5.57″E	Attached outbuilding from 1849

=== 4780 Stege ===
Listing name	Image	Location	Coordinates	Description	
Hage House		Storegade 4A, 4780 Stege	54°58′57.82″N 12°16′59.92″E	Building on Storegade with side wing on Billedhuggerstræde, dating from 1816 except for the four easternmost bays which are from 1845	
Hage House: Billedhuggerstræde 2		Billedhuggerstræde 2, 4780 Stege	54°58′58″N 12°17′1.76″E	Building on Storegade with side wing on Billedhuggerstræde, dating from 1816 except for the four easternmost bays which are from 1845	
Liselund		Langebjergvej 4, 4791 Borre	1792	Liselund House	1
Liselund		Langebjergvej 4, 4791 Borre	1790	Chinese pavilion	390-7746-5
Liselund		Langebjergvej 4, 4791 Borre	1790	Norwegian House	390-7746-4
Liselund		Langebjergvej 4, 4791 Borre	1790	Swiss Cottage	390-7746-2
Liselund		Langebjergvej 6, 4791 Borre	1887	Liselund Ny Slot	390-11318-1
Liselund		Langebjergvej 8, 4791 Borre	1790		390-10934-6
Liselund		Langebjergvej 8, 4791 Borre	1790		390-10934-8
Liselund		Langebjergvej 8, 4791 Borre	1790		390-10934-8
Kammerrådgården		Storegade 35A, 4780 Stege	54°59′5.59″N 12°17′5.83″E	Building on Storegade from c. 1770 whose facade was altered in c. 1800	
Kammerrådgården		Storegade 35D, 4780 Stege	54°59′6.05″N 12°17′5.83″E	Rear wing with exposed timber framing	
Kammerrådgården		Storegade 35K, 4780 Stege	54°59′6.69″N 12°17′5.83″E	Warehouse	
Kammerrådgården		Storegade 35L, 4780 Stege	54°59′6.05″N 12°17′5.83″E	Stables	
Klintholm Manor		Klintholm Alle 1A, 4791 Borre	54°58′43.45″N 12°30′12.59″E		
Mølleporten		Storegade 75A, 4780 Stege	54°59′13.95″N 12°17′21.44″E	Gate tower from c. 1480-1500	
Møns Museum		Storegade 75, 4780 Stege	54°59′13.52″N 12°17′20.31″E	Four-winged complex from 1813 and two half-timbered buildings	
Møns Museum		Storegade 75, 4780 Stege	54°59′13.52″N 12°17′20.31″E	Four-winged complex from 1813 and two half-timbered buildings	
Møns Museum		Storegade 75, 4780 Stege	54°59′13.52″N 12°17′20.31″E	Four-winged complex from 1813 and two half-timbered buildings	
Møns Museum		Storegade 75, 4780 Stege	54°59′13.52″N 12°17′20.31″E	Four-winged complex from 1813 and two half-timbered buildings	
Møns Museum		Storegade 75, 4780 Stege	54°59′13.52″N 12°17′20.31″E	Four-winged complex from 1813 and two half-timbered buildings	
Museumsgården ved Keldbylille		Skullebjergvej 15, 4780 Stege		Part of the residential wing.	
Museumsgården ved Keldbylille		Skullebjergvej 15, 4780 Stege		Oart of the residential wing.	
Museumsgården ved Keldbylille		Skullebjergvej 15, 4780 Stege			
Museumsgården ved Keldbylille		Skullebjergvej 15, 4780 Stege			
Museumsgården ved Keldbylille		Skullebjergvej 15, 4780 Stege			
Museumsgården ved Keldbylille		Skullebjergvej 15, 4780 Stege		Stable.	
Museumsgården ved Keldbylille		Skullebjergvej 15, 4780 Stege			
Museumsgården ved Keldbylille		Skullebjergvej 15, 4780 Stege			
Nordfeld		Nordfeldvej 48, 4780 Stege	55°1′9.55″N 12°23′40.3″E	The residential north wing of avlsgård	
Nordfeld		Nordfeldvej 48A, 4780 Stege		Part of the east wing of avlsgård with stables	
Nordfeld		Nordfeldvej 50, 4780 Stege	55°1′19.21″N 12°23′40.3″E		
Nordfeld		Nordfeldvej 50, 4780 Stege	55°1′19.21″N 12°23′40.3″E		
Nordfeld		Nordfeldvej 50, 4780 Stege	55°1′19.21″N 12°23′40.3″E		
Nordfeld		Nordfeldvej 50, 4780 Stege	55°1′19.21″N 12°23′40.3″E		
Nordfeld		Nordfeldvej 50, 4780 Stege	55°1′19.21″N 12°23′40.3″E		
Nordfeld		Nordfeldvej 50, 4780 Stege	55°1′19.21″N 12°23′40.3″E		
Nordfeld		Nordfeldvej 52, 4780 Stege	55°1′19.21″N 12°23′40.3″E	Rwo-storey brick house	
Nordfeld		Nordfeldvej 54, 4780 Stege	55°1′19.63″N 12°23′40.3″E	One-storey thatched brick house	
Nordfeld		Nordfeldvej 56, 4780 Stege	55°1′20.67″N 12°23′40.3″E	Thatched outbuilding with exposed timber framing	
Nybøllegård		Grønsundvej 50, 4780 Stege	54°58′17.83″N 12°15′26.74″E	Country house from 1856 by Gottlieb Bindesbøll	
Nyord: Nordgade 7		Nordgade 7, 4780 Stege	55°2′30.68″N 12°11′45.22″E	Three-wined farm from the 18th century	
Nyord: Nordgade 9		Nordgade 7, 4780 Stege	55°2′29.98″N 12°11′45.5″E	Half-rimbered building from the 19th century	
Nyord: Østergade 7 and Nordgade 11, Nyord		Østergade 7, 4780 Stege	55°2′29.91″N 12°11′47.3″E	Half-timbered house from the 19th century	
Nyord: Østergade 7 and Nordgade 11, Nyord		Nordgade 11, 4780 Stege	55°2′29.93″N 12°11′47.3″E	Half-timbered house from the 19th century	
Østergade 9		Østergade 9, 4780 Stege			
Østergade 9		Østergade 9, 4780 Stege			
Østergade 9		Østergade 9, 4780 Stege			
Østergade 9		Østergade 9, 4780 Stege			
Østergade 9		Østergade 9, 4780 Stege			
Rødkilde Højskole		Rødkildevej 42A, 4780 Stege	54°58′6.52″N 12°16′10.15″E	Octagonal assembly building from 1878 bu Povlsen Nørbjerg	
Rødkilde Højskole		Rødkildevej 42D, 4780 Stege	54°58′8.9″N 12°16′10.15″E	Main building from 1866 by Ludvig Fenger	
Rødkilde Højskole		Rødkildevej 42E, 4780 Stege	54°58′6.05″N 12°16′10.15″E	Residential quarters for students from 1866 by Ludvig Fenger	
Stege Latin School		Provstestræde 2, 4780 Stege	54°59′1.82″N 12°17′1.04″E	L-shaped building from the Late Middle Ages	
Stege Latin School		Provstestræde 2, 4780 Stege	54°59′1.82″N 12°17′1.04″E	Outbuilding from c. 1830	
Stege Pharmacy		Storegade 48, 4780 Stege	54°59′6.42″N 12°17′10.04″E	The building on the street from 1688, a side wing from 1889 and the cobbled courtyard	
Stege Rampart		Møllebrøndstræde 0, 4780 Stege			
Stege Rectory		Dybsbrostræde 1, 4780 Steg			
Stege Town Hall		Storegade 39, 4780 Stege	54°58′57.82″N 12°16′59.92″E	Former town hall from 1853 to 1854 by Gottlieb Bindesbøll	
Storegade 88		Storegade 88C, 4780 Stege			

=== 4793 Bogø By ===
Listing name	Image	Location	Coordinates	Description
Bogø Windmill		Bogø Hovedgade 36, 4793 Bogø By	54°55′8.26″N 12°3′0.15″E	Smock mill from 1852
Bogø Møllegård		Bogø Hovedgade 36, 4793 Bogø By	54°55′11.93″N 12°2′56.63″E	Miller's house from c. 1790

== Delisted buildings ==
Listing name	Image	Location	Coordinates	Description
Bogø Navigation School		Bogø Hovedgade 140A, 4793 Bogø By	54°55′45.27″N 12°2′53.53″E	School building from c. 1885
Klosterly		Adelgade 119, 4720 Præstø	55°7′23.15″N 12°2′48.5″E	Building from 1882
Klosterly		Adelgade 119B, 4720 Præstø	55°7′24.25″N 12°2′48.5″E	Rear wing from 1882
Stege Nursing Home		Langgade 59A, 4780 Stege	54°59′16.09″N 12°16′56.36″E	Wing on Langgade built as a navigation school in 1703
Torvet 19		Torvet 19, 4720 Præstø	55°7′26.4″N 12°2′42.43″E	Townhouse from 1853 by M.S. Miede
Torbet 21		Torvet 21, 4720 Præstø	55°7′26.58″N 12°2′43.22″E	House from 1853 by M.S. Miede

== See also ==
- List of protected areas of Vordingborg Municipality
