= Mølleporten =

Listed building in Denmark

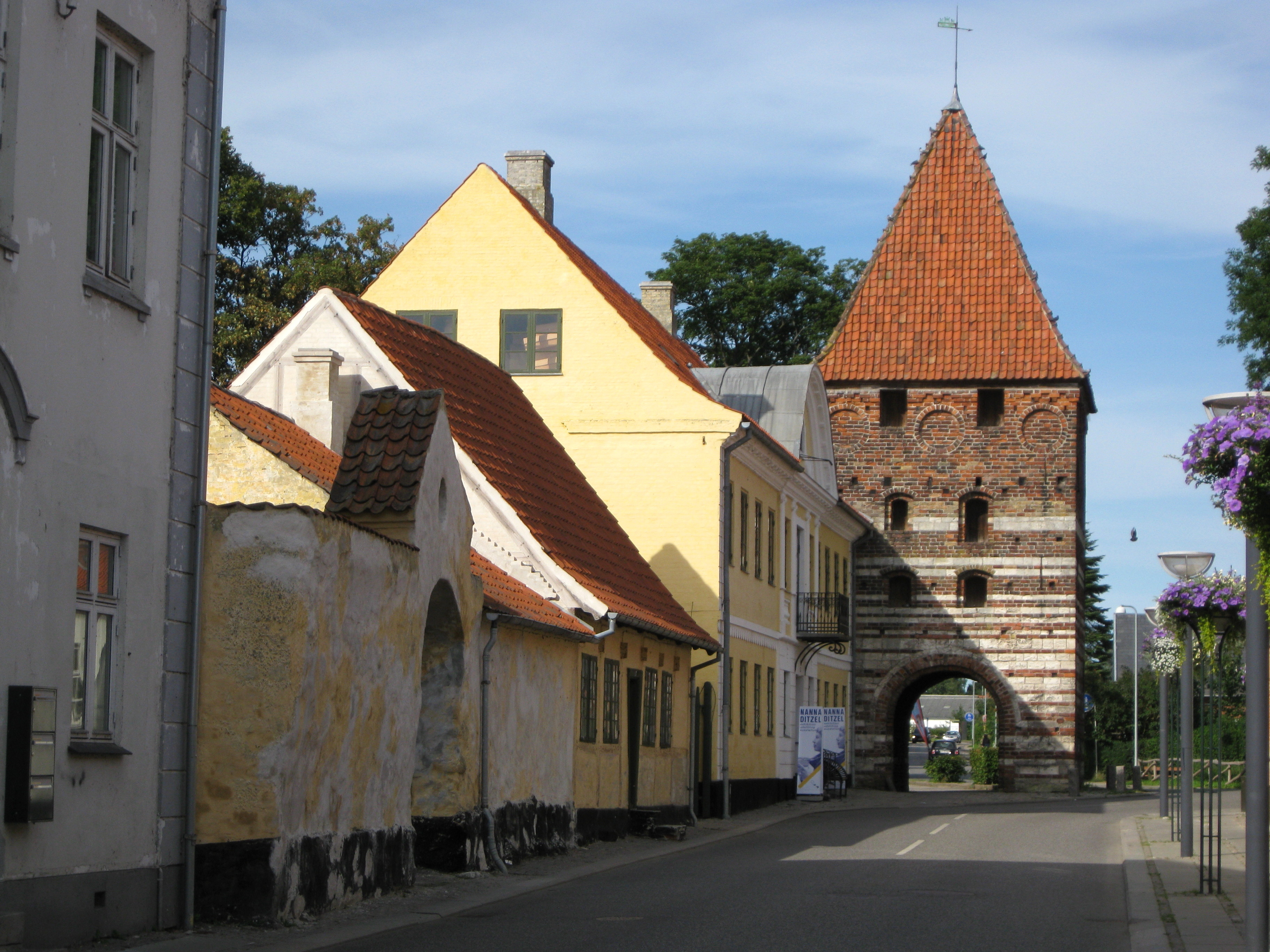
- Interactive map of the Mølleporten area

General information
- Location: Storegade 75A, 4780 Stege, Denmark
- Coordinates: 54°59′13.96″N 12°17′21.44″E
- Completed: 15th century

Mølleporten (lit. "The Mill Gate") is the former eastern town gate of Stege on Møn in southeastern Denmark. The building was listed on the Danish register of protected buildings and places in 1918. It is one of only two surviving Medieval town gates in Denmark, the other being Vesterport (Western Gate) in Faaborg. The four-storey gatehouse is located just inside Stege Town Rampart (Danish: Stege Byvold), a somewhat reduced earth rampart which runs from Stege Bay in the west to Stege Nor in the east. The building was restored with economic support from Realdania in 2019–2022. Its upper floor provides fine views of Stege's historic town centre.

== History ==
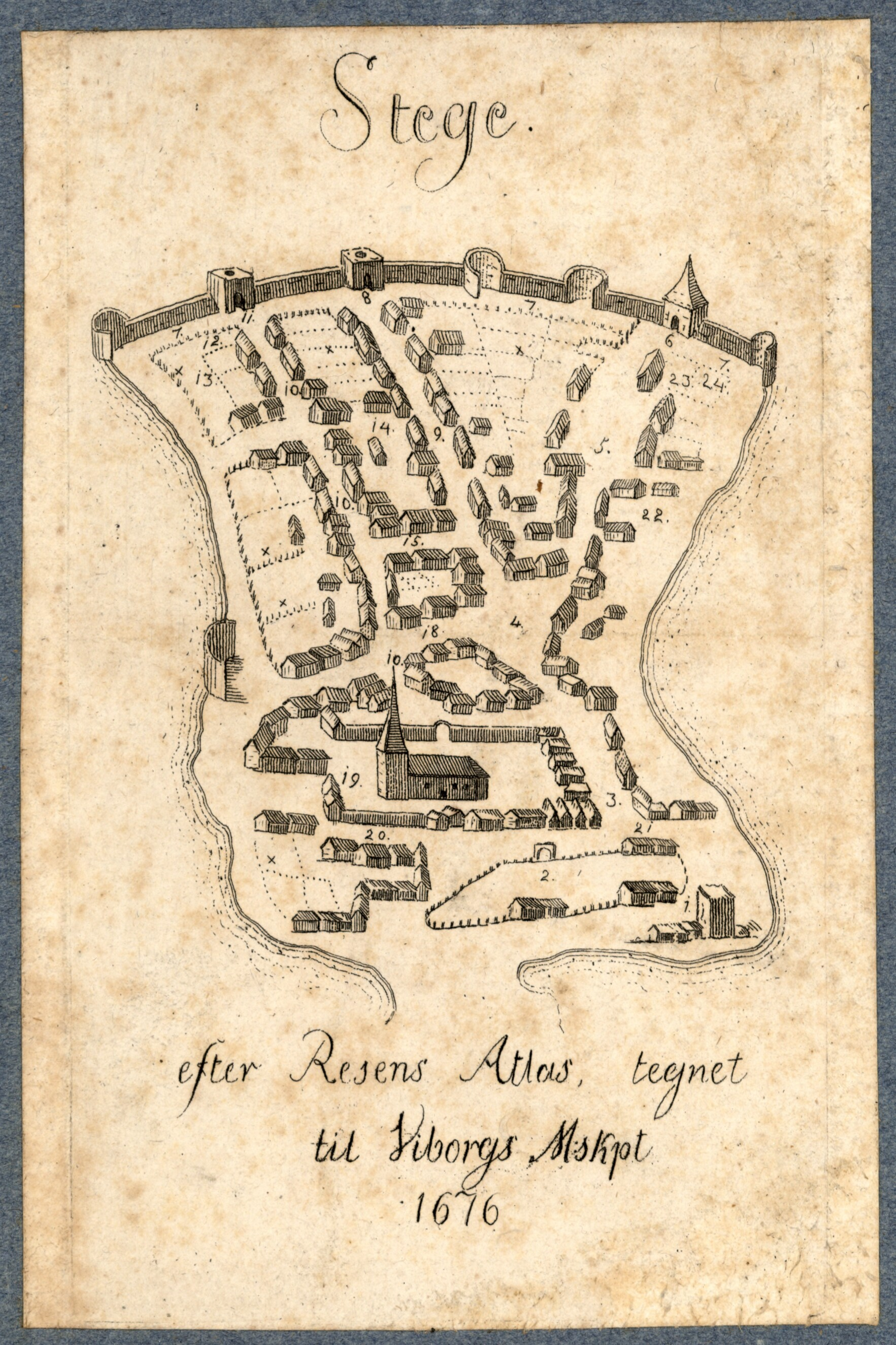
Stege Rampart visible in a town plan from 1676. The Mølleporten is seen in the upper right corner, complete with the pyramidical roof.

Around 1430, Stege Byvold was constructed along the northern edge of the town. The structure consisted of a wall built on top of an earth rampart with a moat in front of it. Three gate towers were constructed towards the end of the century, one on each of the three roads which passed through the rampart. Mølleporten was the eastern of these town gates. The name refers to its location at the end of the no longer existing street Møllestræde (Mill Street). Most of Stege's windmills were located on Møllemarken outside the gate.

The first reference to the building in written records is in Stege Bysbog from 1531. The inscription of the year "1674" on a limestone ashlar indicates that the building was subject to a major renovation in that year.

Mølleporten in Illustreret Tidende.

In 1685, it was decided to station one half of the Royal Horse Guards on Møn. At the same time, Samuel Christoph von Plessen, their commander, was appointed county governor (Amtmand) of the island. He chose to demolish much of the town wall and two of the town's three town gates to provide building materials for a new main building on the Nygård estate, leaving only Mølleporten intact. He installed a prison cell on the first floor of the Mølleporten building. Plessen was known for his brutal treatment of local farmers and general misuse of power, something that earned him the nickname "The Evil Pless" ("Sen Onde Pless" among the local residents of the island. In 1708. he was finally put on trial and sentenced to prison for his conduct.

An attached guardhouse was constructed on the south side of the tower in the 18th century. It was used for the collection of Octroi on goods brought into the town for consumption. It was demolished in 1796.

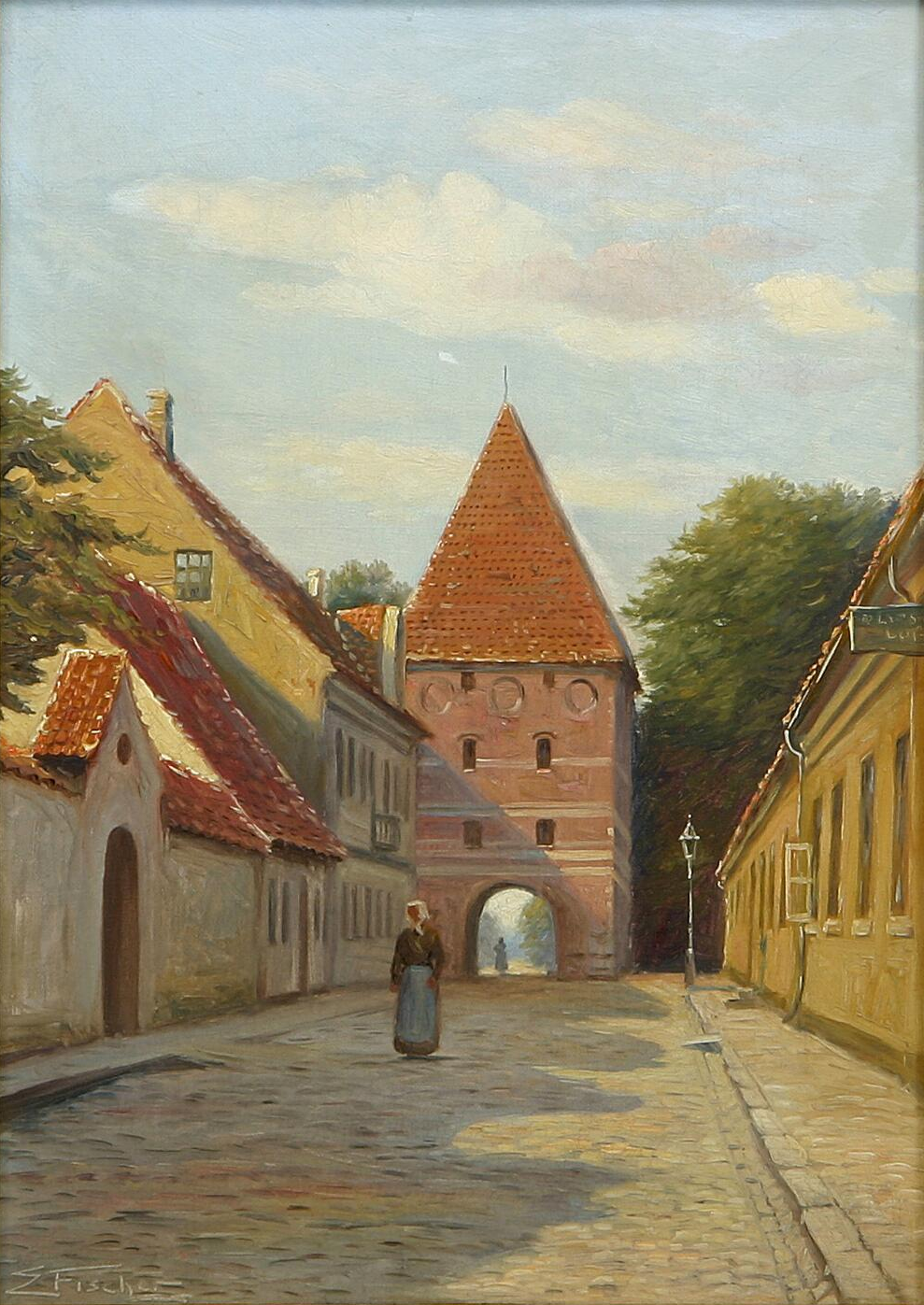
Mølleporten painted in the beginning of the 20th century.

In 1874 it was decided to demolish the building, but the plan was not realized and instead the gatehouse was listed for protection in 1895 (fredlyst). It was included on the Danish register of protected buildings and places when the new Danish Building Protection Act (Bygningsfredningsloven) was adopted in 1918. The adjacent Stege Town Rampart was also listed on the register of protected buildings and places in 1918.

It was not until 1987 that the gateway was closed to traffic. Larger vehicles were able to pass through the rampart just south of the building.

== Architecture ==
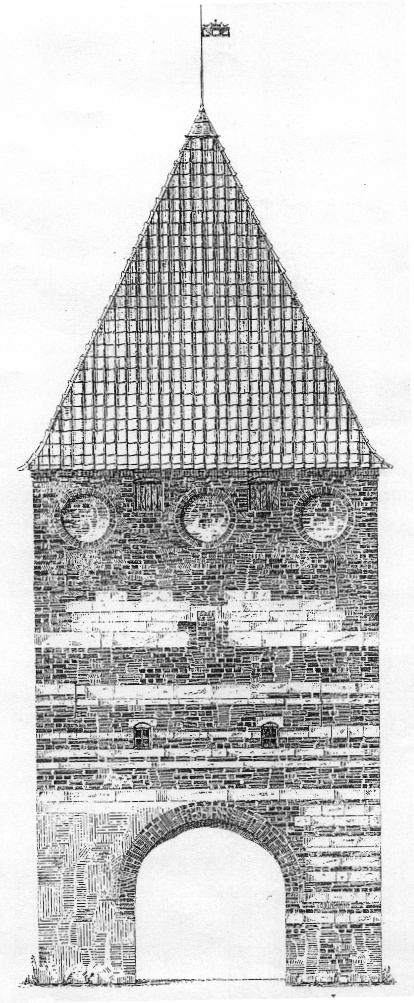
Mølleporten.

The four-storey gatehouse is constructed with alternating bands of red brick and white limestone ashlars in the same way that is seen on Stege Church. The white limestone bands are wider and closer together on the lower part of the building, invoking an impression of robustness, The striped masonry of the two buildings have inspired later landmarks in the area, such as Stege Town Hall. The east and west sides of the tower are finished with wall anchors and circular blindings below the roof. The edges of the gateway are flanked by granite guard stones on both sides of the building. The steep, puramidical tile roof is probably a later addition. The original building was most likely topped by pinackles surrounded by an open gallery. The roof is topped by a weather vane.

== Today ==
The building was subject to comprehensive restoration work in 2019–2022. This was done with economic support from Realdania. The street was lowered with around 80 cm to restore the building to its original appearance.

== Cultural references ==
Mølleporten was used as a location in the 1851 Danish comedy film Og så er der bal bagefter.

== See also ==
- Abbey Gate (Sorø)
