= List of protected areas of Vordingborg Municipality =

This is a list of protected areas of Vordingborg Municipality, Denmark.

== List ==
=== Zealand ===
Image	Locality	Size	Year	Coordinates	Description
	Avnø and Avnø Røn	1358	2002		
	Balle Strand		1960		
	Gammel Kalvehave beach meadows	75 ha	1950		
	Kirkeskoven and Kirkeengen		2922		
	Kastrup Church				The immediate surroundings of the church.
	Køng Kirke				
	Kulsbjerge	c. 10 ha	1947		
	Jungshoved Nor	415 ha	1975		Open coastal landscapes surrounding Jungshoved Nor.
	Marienlyst		1965 / 1973		
	Ore coast and the view from Rosenfeldt	c. 10 ha	1948 / 1952		
	Øster Egesborg Church				
	Sværdborg Church				Protected to preserve the open views of the church.
	Svinø Church				Protected to preserve the open views of the church.
	Teglgården Fæby	20 ha	1974		
	Udby Church				Protected to preserve the open views of the church.

=== Møn ===
Image	Locality	Size	Year	Coordinates	Description
	Bogø Church				Protected to ensure the open views of the church.
	Bogø Windmill				Protected to ensure the open views of the windmill.

=== Møn ===
Image	Locality	Size	Year	Coordinates	Description
	Damsholte Church				Protected to ensure the open views of the church.
	Elmelunde Church				Protected to ensure the open views of the church.
	Fanefjord Church				Protected to ensure the open views of the church.
	Keldby Church				Protected to ensure the open views of the church.
	Høje Møn	c. 1m200 ha	1980/1983		Hilly area located adjacent to Møns Klint.
	Mandehøje				
	Postgården	c. 16 ha	1964		Protection of an area to avoid the construction of more syummer houses.
	Råbylille Strand		1962		A narrow strip of land along the beach.
	Stege Sugar Factory's former soil basins		1993		Stege Sugar Factory's former soil basins.
	Strandskov	1 ha	1965		Protected to ensure public access to the beach.
	Ulvshale—Nyord	629 ha (Ulvshale); 478 ha (Nyord)	1929 / 1947 / 1972 / 1974 / 1975 / 1980		Small woodland, heatherland and beach meadows..

== See also ==
- Listed buildings in Vordingborg Municipality
