= Langebaek =

Langebaek may refer to:

- Langebæk, a small village in southern Denmark
- Carl Henrik Langebaek, Colombian anthropologist and Muisca scholar
