= Langebæk =

Village in Vordingborg Municipality, Denmark

Coordinates: 55°00′N 12°06′E

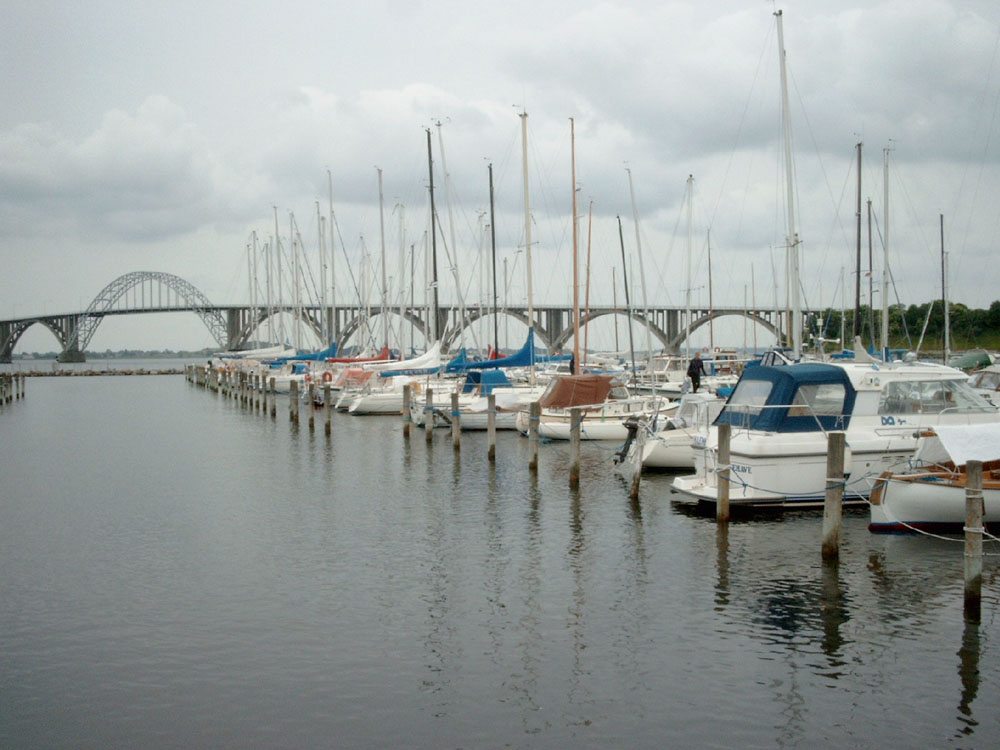
View of harbour in Kalvehave, Denmark with Queen Alexandrines Bridge to the island of Møn in the background. Photographer: Dan Simon.

Langebæk (Danish pronunciation: [ˈlɑŋəˌpek]) is a town with a population of 236 (1 January 2026), which until 1 January 2007 was the municipal seat of the former Langebæk Municipality (Danish, kommune) in Region Sjælland on the southeastern tip of the island of Zealand (Sjælland) in south Denmark.

== Langebæk Municipality ==
The municipality included the islands of Langø, Tærø and Lilleø, and it covered an area of 101 km^{2} (39 square miles). It had a total population of 6,332 in 2005. Its last mayor was Henrik Holmer, a member of the Social Democrats (Socialdemokraterne) political party.

To the east is Hølen, a strait separating Zealand from the island of Nyord, and then further south is Stege Bay (Stege Bugt), which is the main body of water separating the former municipality from the next major island to the southwest, the island of Møn. At the narrowest point between the two islands to the south of Langebæk, the waters are named Wolf Strait (Ulvsund). There are a number of islands in the waters between Zealand and Møn, including the islands of Langø, Tærø and Lilleø.

The Queen Alexandrine Bridge connects the former municipality, and the island of Zealand, to Møn at the town of Kalvehave. The bridge opened for traffic on 30 May 1943, and is named after Queen Alexandrine, the Queen Consort of King Christian X. The bridge is 746 metres (2,448 ft) long.

On 1 January 2007, Langebæk municipality ceased to exist, owing to Kommunalreformen ("The Municipality Reform" of 2007). It was merged with Møn, Præstø, and Vordingborg municipalities to form an enlarged Vordingborg municipality. This created a municipality with an area of 615 km^{2} (237 square miles) and a total population of 46,307 (2005).

== See also ==
- Stensbygård
