= Petersværft =

Petersværft (literally "Peter's Wharf") is a locality situated on the south coast of Zealand, between Vordingborg and Kalvehave, in southeastern Denmark. It consists of a small, private harbor that belongs to the Petersgaard estate and a few scattered houses. Several of the buildings have been listed on the Danish registry of protected buildings and places.

Petersværft is situated at the foot of a hill, Stehlebakken. It is surrounded by Langebæk Skov to the east and Stensby Skov to the west.

== History ==
Peter Johansen, a merchant and shipowner from Copenhagen, acquired the estate Kalvehave in auction from the Crown in 1774. He renamed it Petersgaard and constructed a Neoclassical main building on the land in the period 17667-80. In 1777 he also established a dockyard at the site. Ships built at the dockyard included Enigheden (1781) Cron Princesse Louice Augusta (1784) and Christiane (1785). Cron Princesse Louice Augusta was built for the Danish Asiatic Company and was the largest Danish ship built outside Copenhagen at the time.

Peter Johansen died on the Petersgaard estate in 1798 and his heirs sold it to the Crown the following year. The Crown sold Petersgaard to Jacob Bentzon Resch but kept the forests and dockyard. Petersværft was from 1807 to 1814 used as a naval base and for rebuilding the Danish navy which had been confiscated by the Royal Navy in the aftermath of the Battle of Copenhagen in 1807. Several new buildings were constructed at the site.

== Harbour ==
The harbor comprises a 30 m × 20 m (98 ft × 66 ft) harbor basin situated on the west side of a 69 m-long (226 ft) pier. The harbor basin is reserved for the owner of the harbor (Petersgaard) and the residents of Tærø. Other sailors are allowed to berth at the end of the pier for periods of up to 24 hours.

== Buildings ==
The Forest Coachman's House (Skovkuskeboligen, Petersværft 5), also known as Forpagterboligen, dates from the late 18th century. It is a thatched building with half-timbered gables.

Skovridergården (Petersværft 3) dates from circa 1800. It is a brick building with a red tile roof. It also comprises an L-shaped, half-timbered, thatched barn.

The Officers' House (Petersvært4) is the only surviving building from Petersværft's years as a naval base. The oldest part of the building is from 1807 but it was expanded in 1885 and 1903. It is an L-shaped brick building with a half hipped red tile roof.

Skovfogedstedet (Petersværft 2) is a one-storey, thatched house from 1905 which was expanded in 1916. It also comprises a thatched outbuilding. Both buildings were listed in 1994.
