= Stege Town Hall =

Listed building in Denmark

- Stege Rådhus
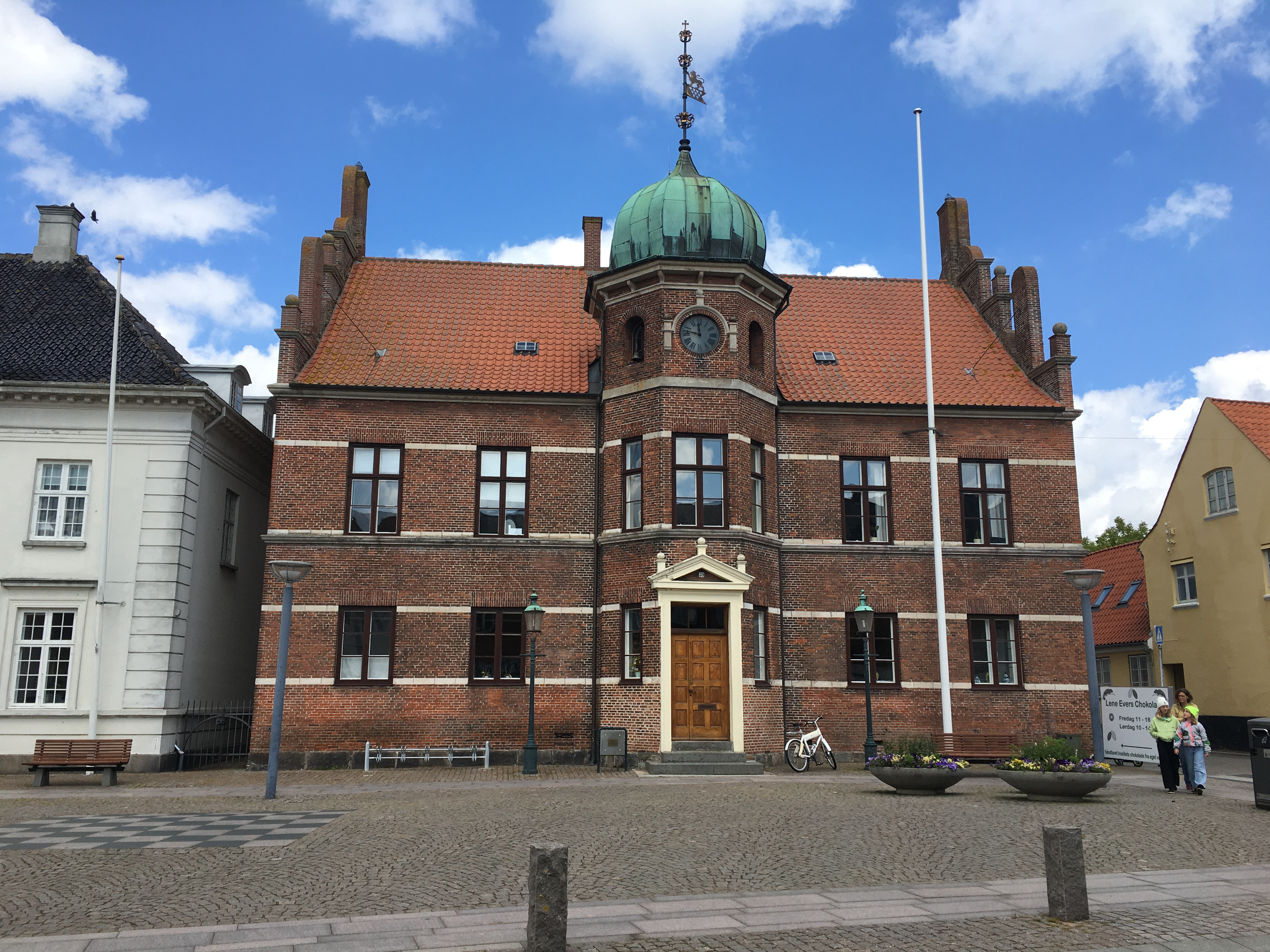
- Interactive map of the Stege Town Hall area

General information
- Architectural style: Renaissance Revival
- Location: Storegade 39, 4780 Stege, Denmark
- Coordinates: 54°59′6.5″N 12°17′9.89″E
- Completed: 1854

Stege Town Hall (Danish: Stege Rådhus), situated at the corner of Rådhusgade and Storegade, is the former town hall of Stege on Møn, now part of Vordingborg Municipality, in southeastern Denmark. The Renaissance Revival style building was completed in 1854 to designs by Gottlieb Bindesbøll and served its original purpose for just over one hundred years. It was subsequently used as police station from 1968 to 2008. The building was listed on the Danish registry of protected buildings and places in 1979.

== History ==
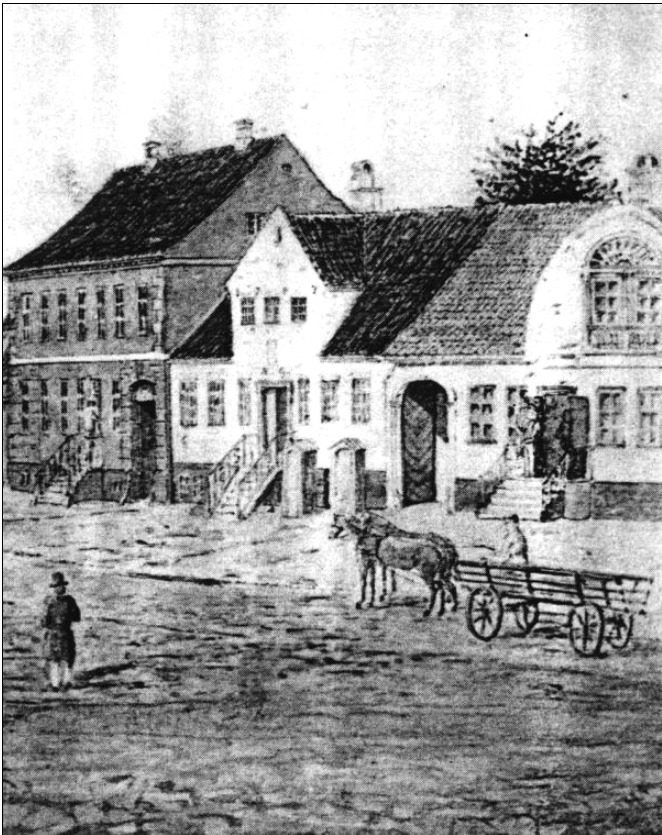
The town hall from 1742 (white building).

=== Earlier buildings ===
In the 15th century Stege's town hall was located at the end of Storegade. It was destroyed by Swedish troops in 1659 and subsequently demolished. It is not clear when a new town hall was built.

Another town hall was destroyed by fire in 1740. The king contributed 5,000 rigsdaler to the construction of a new building. It was completed in 1742.

=== Bindesbøll's town hall ===
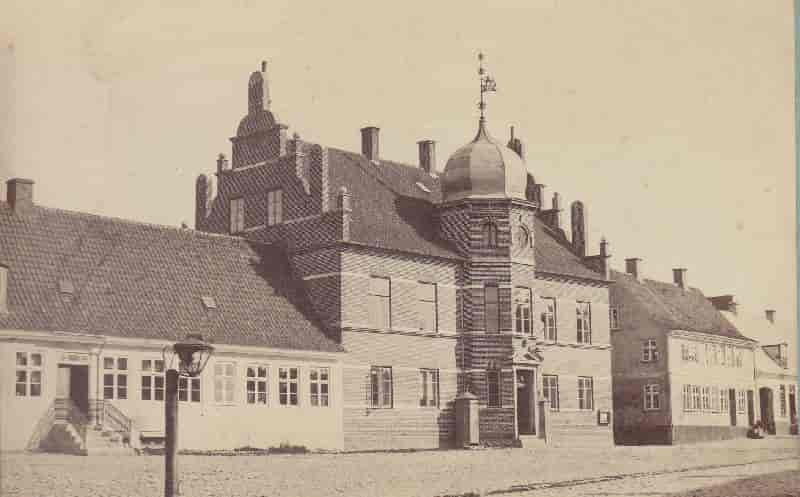
Stege Town Hall, c. 1890.

The 1850s and 1860s saw the construction of numerous new town halls across Denmark. The new town hall in Stege (Storegade 39) was constructed in 1854 to designs by Gottlieb Bindesbøll. It replaced a merchant's house dating from before the Great Fire of 1774. A jail wing was added to the rear of the town hall in 1870.

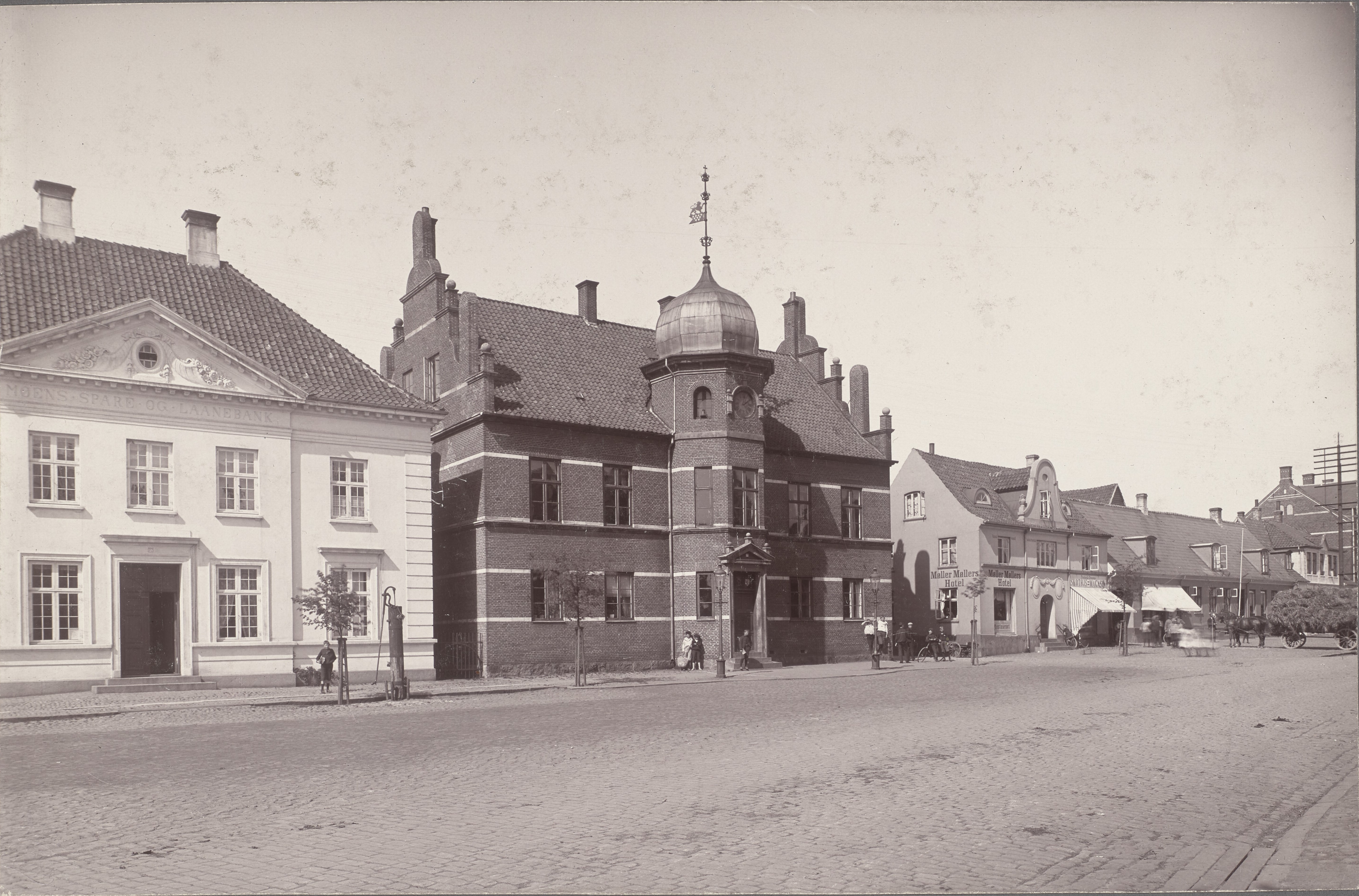
The town hall photographed by Kristian Hude, 1912.

1902-03 saw the installation of electricity in the building. In 1966, central heating was also installed. The jailhouse was decommissioned in 1966.

=== Later history ===
The town hall was decommissioned when the civil parish of Stege was merged with the other civil parishes on the island to form Møn Municipality (Møn Kommune). The new Møn Town Hall was situated at Storegade 56 on the other side of the street. The old building was then put into use as a police station. It was also still used for bailiffs and probate court cases (foged- og skiftesager) until 1995. The police station moved across the street to the new town hall (Storegade 56) in 2008.

== Architecture ==
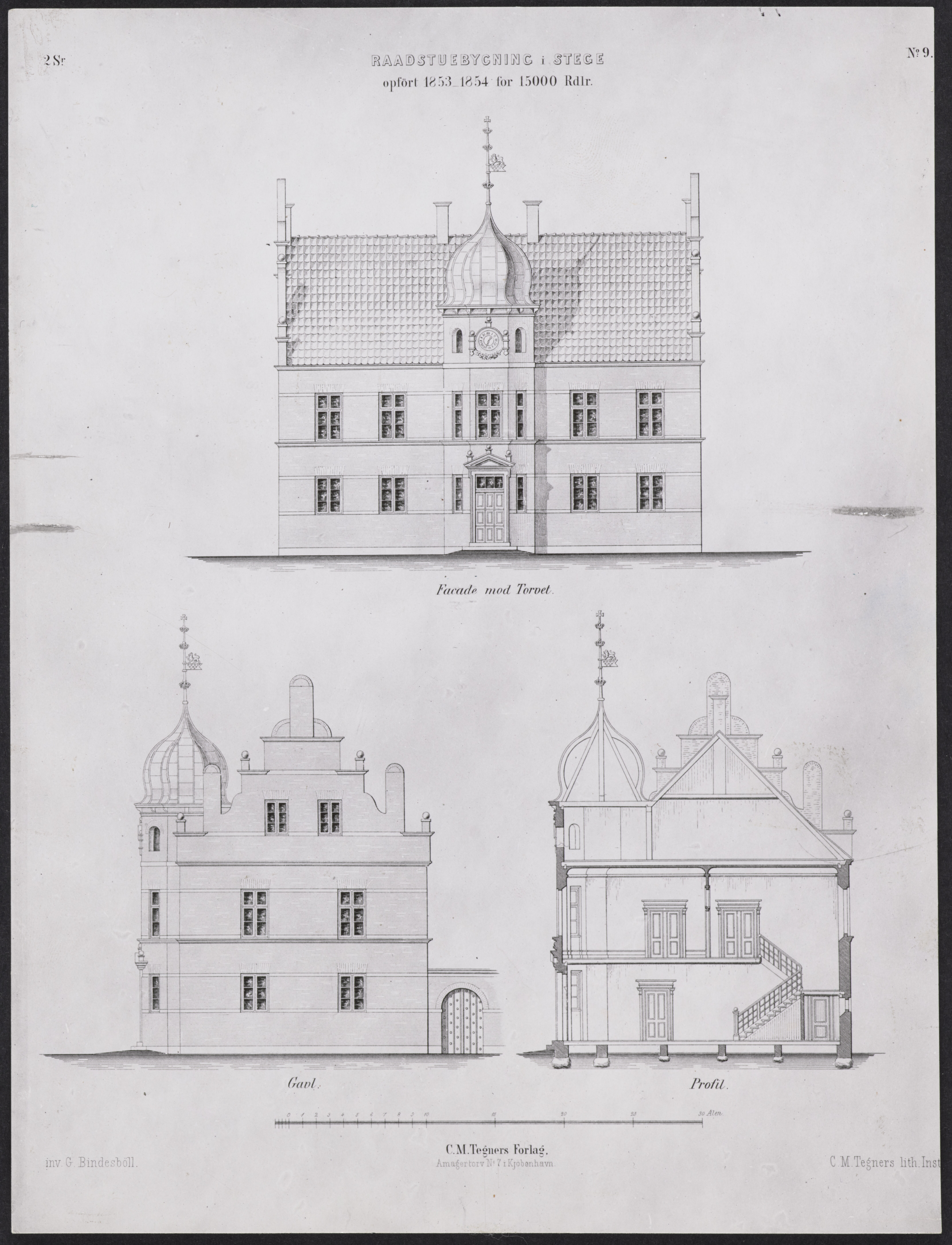
Rendering by Bindesbøll.

Stege Town Hall is designed with inspiration from Dutch Renaissance architecture. The two-storey building is constructed in red brick, with bands of local limestone between the upper and lower edges of the window frames. The latter can be seen as a reference to other local landmarks, such as Stege Church and Mølleporten, but alternating horizontal bands of different colours had on the other hand already characterized several of Bindesbøll's earlier designs, including Hobro Kirke, Thisted Town Hall and Jydske Asyl. In general, Bindesbøll's design of Stege Town Hall is rather similar to his design of the slightly older town hall in Thisted. The facade of the building features an avant-corps in the form of an octagonal tower topped by a copper-clad ogee dome. The tower is also very similar to that of Jydske Asyl. The upper part of the tower front features a clock face. The main entrance is accented by a portal tipped by a triangular pediment with pinnacles. The stepped gables of the building are also finished with pinnacles.

== Today ==
The building is today owned by the local businessman Steffen Steffensen. His office is located in the building. He is also the owner of Liselund Ny Slot and the former Stege Rectory in Dybsbrostræde. In 2022–23, Stege Town Hall was put through a comprehensive external renovation.
