= Stege Pharmacy =

Pharmacy in Møn, Denmark

- Stege Apotek
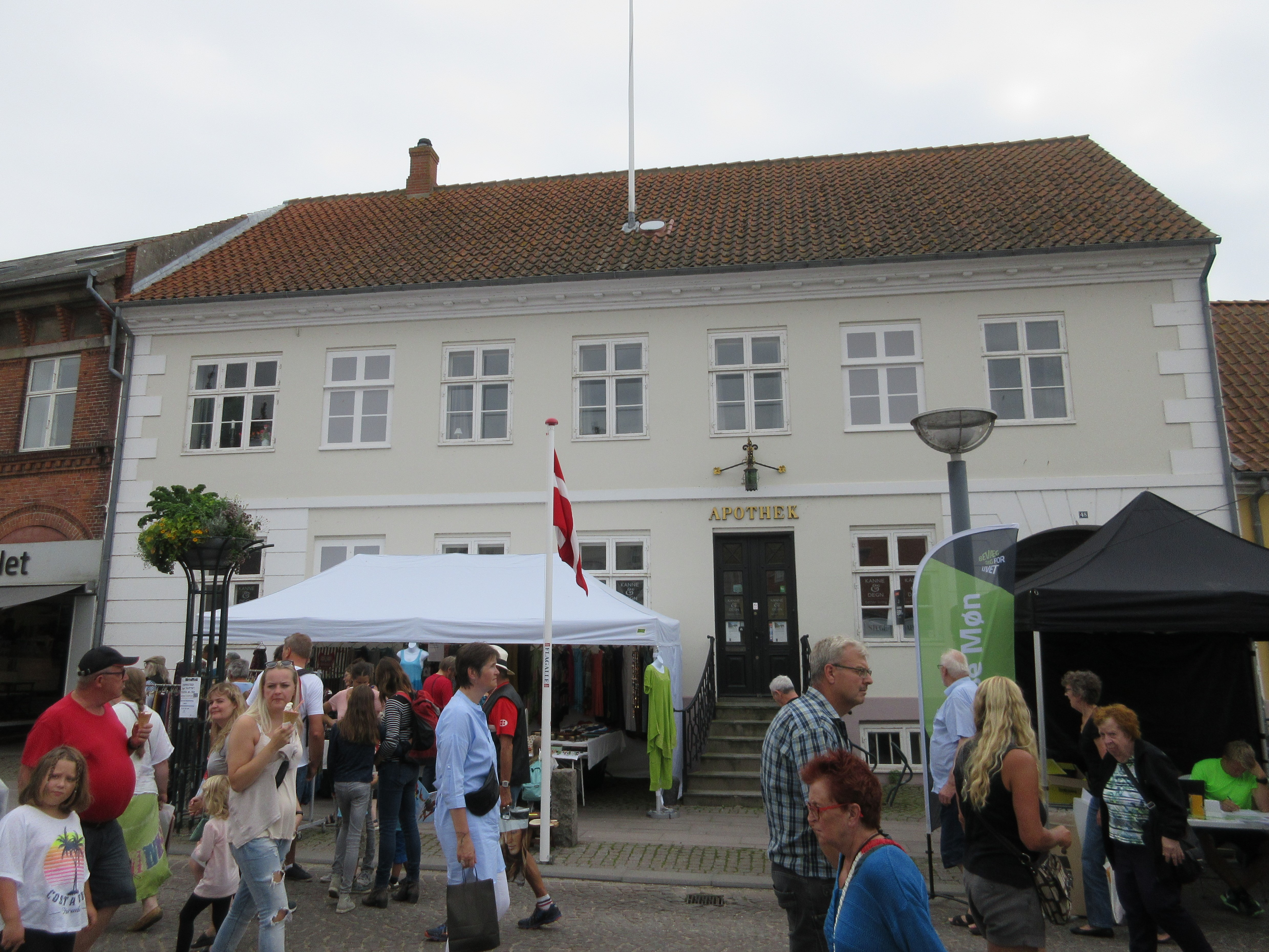
- The pharmacy in 2016
- Interactive map of the Stege Pharmacy area

General information
- Location: Køge, Denmark
- Coordinates: 54°59′5.1″N 12°17′10.25″E
- Completed: 1799

Stege Pharmacy was founded in 1706 in Stege on the island of Møn, Denmark.

== History ==
Stege Pharmacy was founded on 16 January 1706 by Frederik Christian Hartmann.

== Architecture ==
The pharmacy consists of a main wing from 1799 and a side wing from 1889. It was listed on the Danish registry of protected buildings and places in 1024 and the scope of the heritage listing was extended in 1992.
