= Old Town Hall (Vordingborg) =

Listed building in Vordingborg, Denmark

Vordingborg Town Hall
- Vordingborg Rådhus
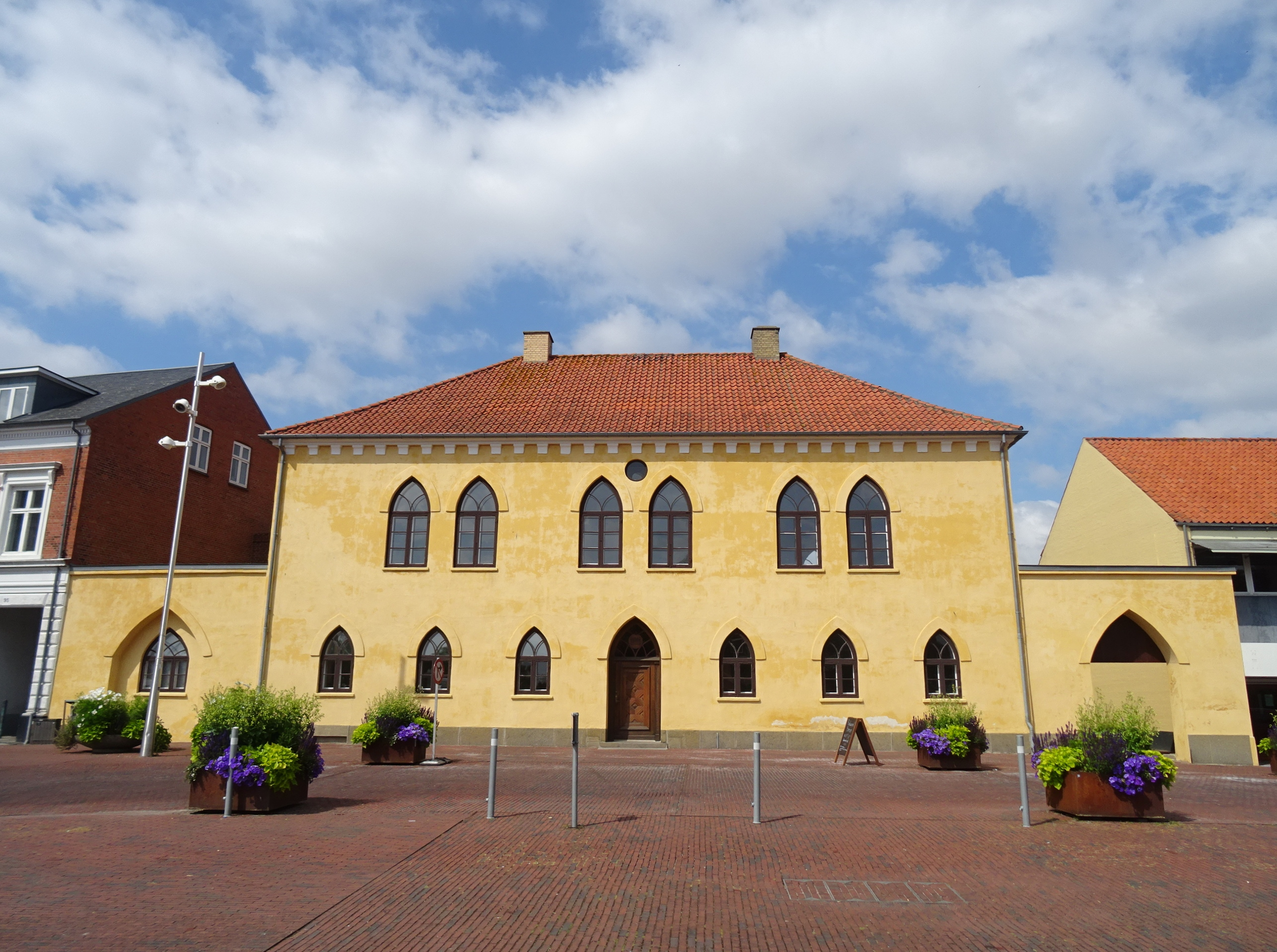
- Interactive map of the Vordingborg Town Hall area

General information
- Architectural style: Renaissance Revival
- Location: Algade 97, 4760 Vordingborg, Denmark
- Coordinates: 54°0′29.88″N 11°54′38.3″E
- Construction started: 1843
- Completed: 1845

Vordingborg Old Town Hall, situated on Slotstorvet, opposite Vordingborg Castle ruin, is the former town hall of Vordingborg, Denmark. Completed in 1845 to design by royal building inspector Peter Kornerup, it is the first Historicist town hall building in Denmark. It was listed on the Danish register of protected buildings and places in 1977. In 2009, some ten years after it was decommissioned, it was bought by Realdania and put through a comprehensive renovation. It houses the local tourist information as well as the administration of Danmarks Borgcenter, an interpretive centre associated with the castle ruin on the other side of the street.

== History ==
=== Earlier town halls ===
In the 17th century, Vordingborg's town hall was located at the corner of Algade and Torvegade (Algade 72). It was a six-bay, half timber building. It featured a small spire clad in slate. In 1785, it was replaced by the former Vordingborg Danish School (as opposed to Vordingborg Latin School). This building was located at Algade85. It contained a jail with room for five prisoners. In 1818, it was pointed out by the local byfoged that the jail was frequently used for 10 prisoners. As a temporary solution, Valdemar's Tower (now Gåsetårnet) was put into use as a jail house.

=== Kornerup's town hall ===
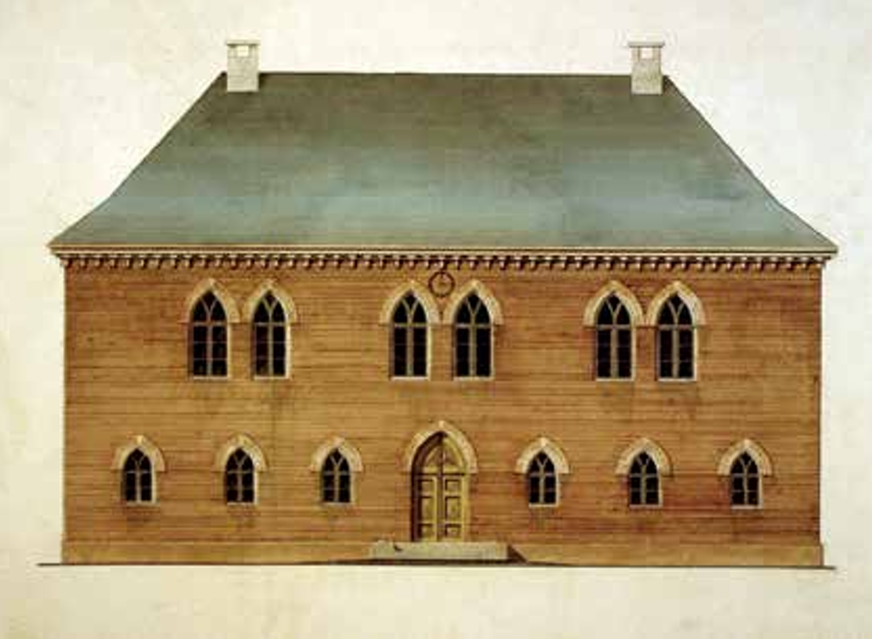
Hetsch's possible design proposal.

In the early 1830s, the plans for a new town hall in Vordingborg were finally revived. Gustav Friedrich Hetsch and a local master craftsman were both asked to create a design proposal but neither of them were approved, Hetsch's because it was deemed to costly and the one by the master craftsman because it was too primitive. The art historian nud von Folsach has identified two renderings by Hetsch of a town hall (dated 1838) which may be his proposal for a new town hall in Vordingborg.

The location of a new town hall was also subject to discussions. Some argued in favour of constructing it in association with the Goose Tower. Another proposal wanted to expand the local rytterskole.

In 1842, it was finally decided to construct it on the site of the town's demolished poorhouse. Royal building inspector Peter Kornerup was charged with designing the building. Construction began in 1832 and the building was inaugurated in 1845.

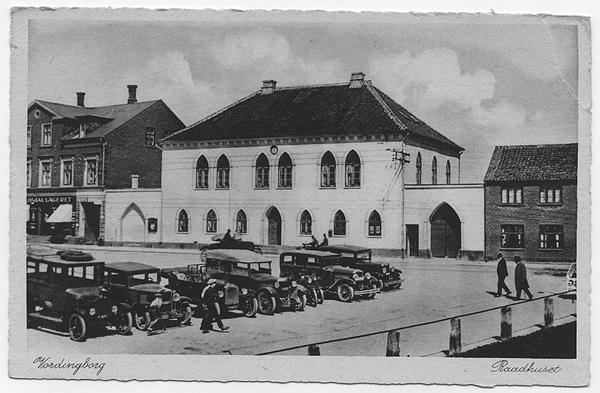
The building in the beginning of the 20th century.

The new building served as town hall, thing house and jail house. The jail cells were located on the ground floor and in the basement. A new jail wing was constructed to the rear of the building in 1896. It was constructed by a master carpenter from Næstved. It had room for 13 prisoners.

=== Later history ===
A new town hall at Valdemarsgade 43 was constructed in 1969. The old town hall was listed on the Danish register of protected buildings and places in 1977.

In 2009, the old town hall building was bought by Realdania Byg for inclusion in its portfolio of historic buildings in Denmark. The building was subsequently put through a comprehensive renovation.

== Architecture ==
The building is the first Historicist town hall in Denmark, an architectural style which would completely dominate Danish town hall design for the next half century. Kornerup's design combines inspiration from Gothic architecture and Neoclassicism. The yellow-plastered facade is finished by a dentillated cornice. The pointed windows and doorways are influenced by Gothic architecture. The six taller windows on the first floor are arranged in pairs. A relatively small clock face is located between the tips of the two central ones. The roof is a gip rood clad in red tile. The roof roof ridge is pierced by two robust chimneys. The renovation was undertaken by Praksis Arkitekter.

The jail wing to the rear of the building was demolished in connection with the 2010 renovation. It was replaced by a partly underground office building. The roof of the partly submerged office building to the rear of the town hall building serves as a public space. A ramp along one side of the building creates a connection between Slotstorvet and a lower-lying square at the back of the complex.

== Today ==
The building is let out to Vordingborg Municipality. It contains the local tourist information and the administration of Danmarks Borgcenter, an interpretive centre associated with the castle ruin on the other side of the square.
