= Rødkilde Højskole =

Folk high school on the Danish island of Møn

Coordinates: 54.9684°N 12.2695°E

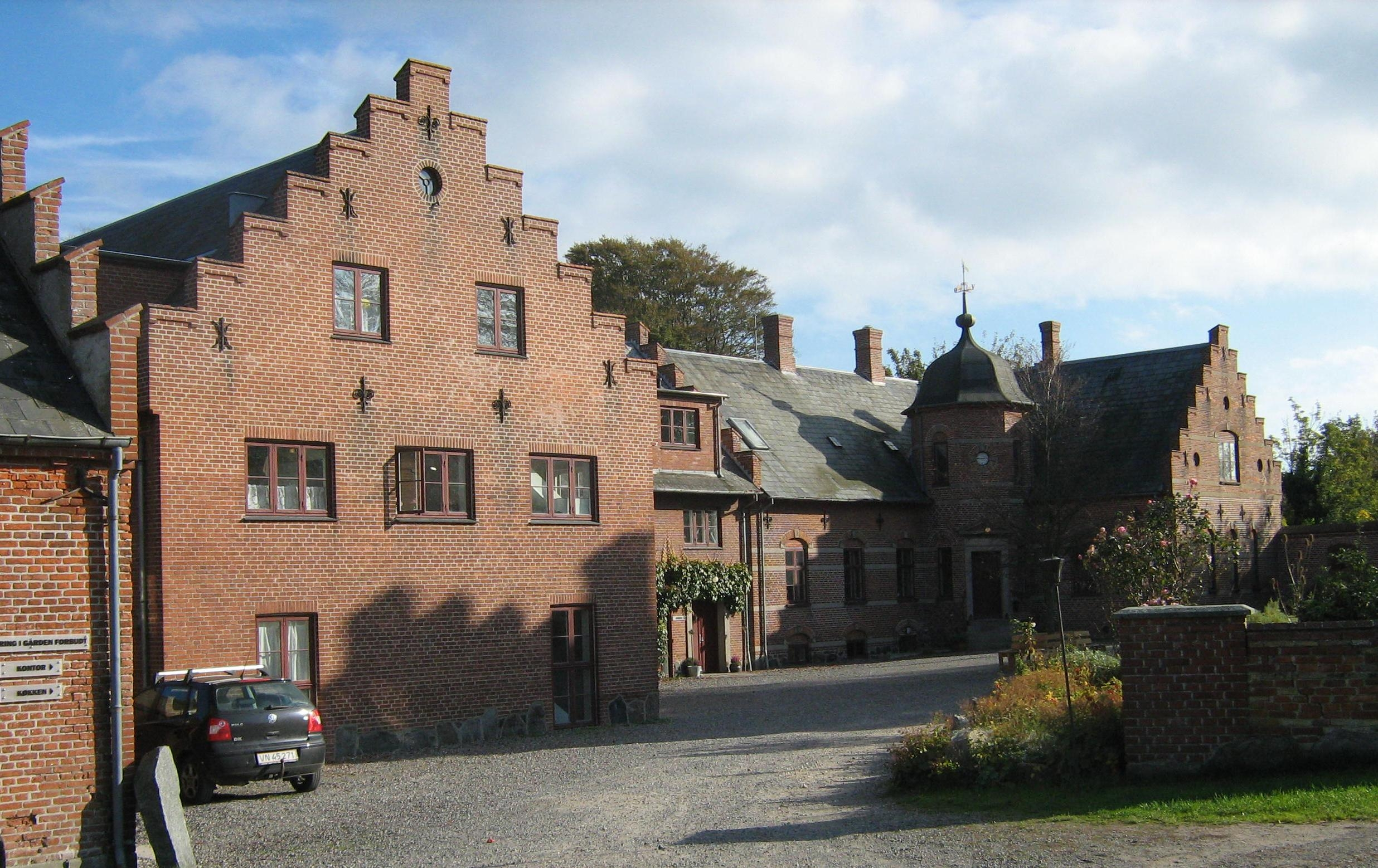
Rødkilde Højskole

Rødkilde Højskole is a folk high school just south of Stege on the Danish island of Møn. Founded in 1866, it is one of the older folk high schools in Denmark. Renamed Teaterhøjskolen Rødkilde (Theatre High School Rødkilde), it now offers both short (4 weeks) and longer (up to 22 weeks) courses for those wishing to learn more about the theatre, especially those aspiring to become actors. The main building by Ludvig Fenger, the student wing and the octagonal assembly building were listed on the Danish registry of protected buildings and places by the Danish Heritage Agency on 8 July 1982.

== Background ==
The concept of the folk high school originated with Denmark's revered theologian and educator, N. F. S. Grundtvig who was inspired by the English boarding schools as well as by the French approach to education for all. In the 19th century, education in Denmark was essentially for the upper and middle classes while farm workers and labourers simply had to learn their trade from their parents. Grundtvig's focus was on popular education and Enlightenment. He aspired to give the peasantry and the lower layers of society a higher educational level through personal development or what he called “the living word”. The language and history of the country, its constitution and main industries (farming) along with folk songs were the guiding principles for education within a Christian framework.

While the first folk high school opened in 1844, it was in the 1860s that the schools began to spread. Christen Kold's unorthodox way of teaching provided a broader democratic basis rather than a strictly religious focus. Teaching took place in the winter from November to March as students needed to work on the farms the rest of the year. In the beginning, only young men could attend the courses but in 1861 young women were also granted access to courses from May to July. The real breakthrough was the Second war of Schleswig in 1864 when Denmark had to surrender a large part of its territory. This initiated a new feeling for Danish consciousness and nationalism based on the enlightenment of the people. Danish, rather than German or Latin, became the preferred language for folk high school education.

The basic principles of the folk high school have continued over the years: there are no demands as to previous education or occupation and there are no examinations; the emphasis is on intellect, reflection and creativity, music and commitment; students are encouraged to be aware of their own ideals in order to develop into democratic members of society. Much of the teaching consists of dialogue between teachers and students and living together as borders encourages stronger relationships and more respect for other people's ideas. The age of the students is usually between 17 and 25 although many are much older, given the emphasis on lifelong learning.

== History ==
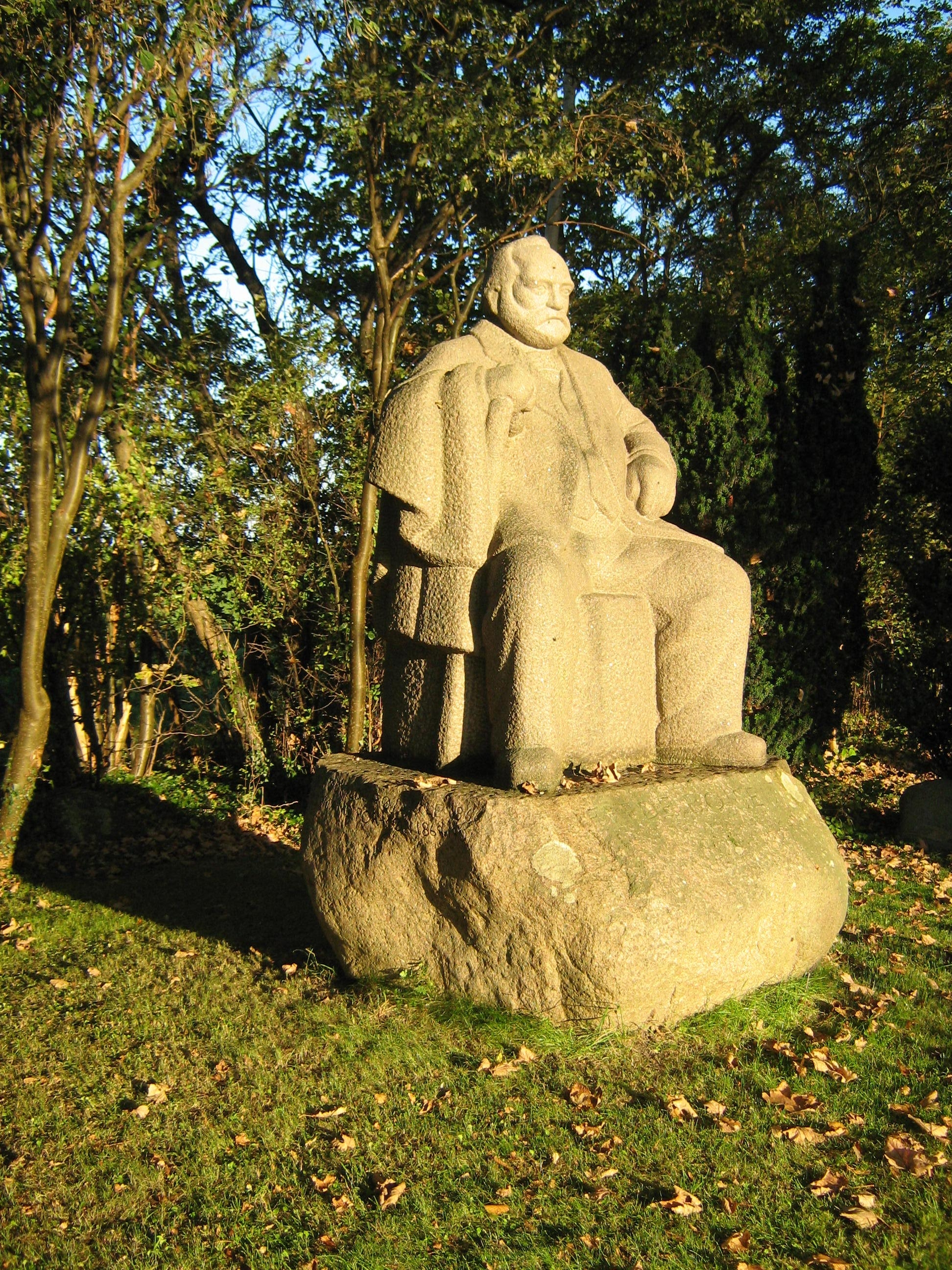
Gunnar Hansen's statue of founder Frede Bojsen

Rødkilde folk high school was founded by Frede Bojsen (1841–1926), an active politician and influential chairman of the parish council in nearby Stege where his father was the pastor. In order to test out his plans for a high school, on 1 May 1865, Bojsen rented a farmhouse in the village of Tjørnemarke a few kilometres north of Stege. On 26 July, he married Karen Anker, a Norwegian, and on 26 October he opened the school with some 30 students from the north of Falster and Møn. Given their initial success, Frede and Karen decided to build a proper school. Thanks to Karen's rich family and the dowry she received, they were in a position to go ahead with their project without delay. They opted for the present site with views over Stege Nor, a stretch of inland water, and the hills of Møns Klint beyond. In fact, Karen was never to see the finished buildings. She died during childbirth on 22 September 1866, just a couple of days before the students were due to arrive. Her husband never forgot her and always reminded his colleagues that the school was a gift from the Ankers. For this reason, on certain occasions, a Norwegian flag is flown at the school. An imposing statue of Bojsen (pictured) by Danish sculptor Gunnar Hansen stands on the school grounds.

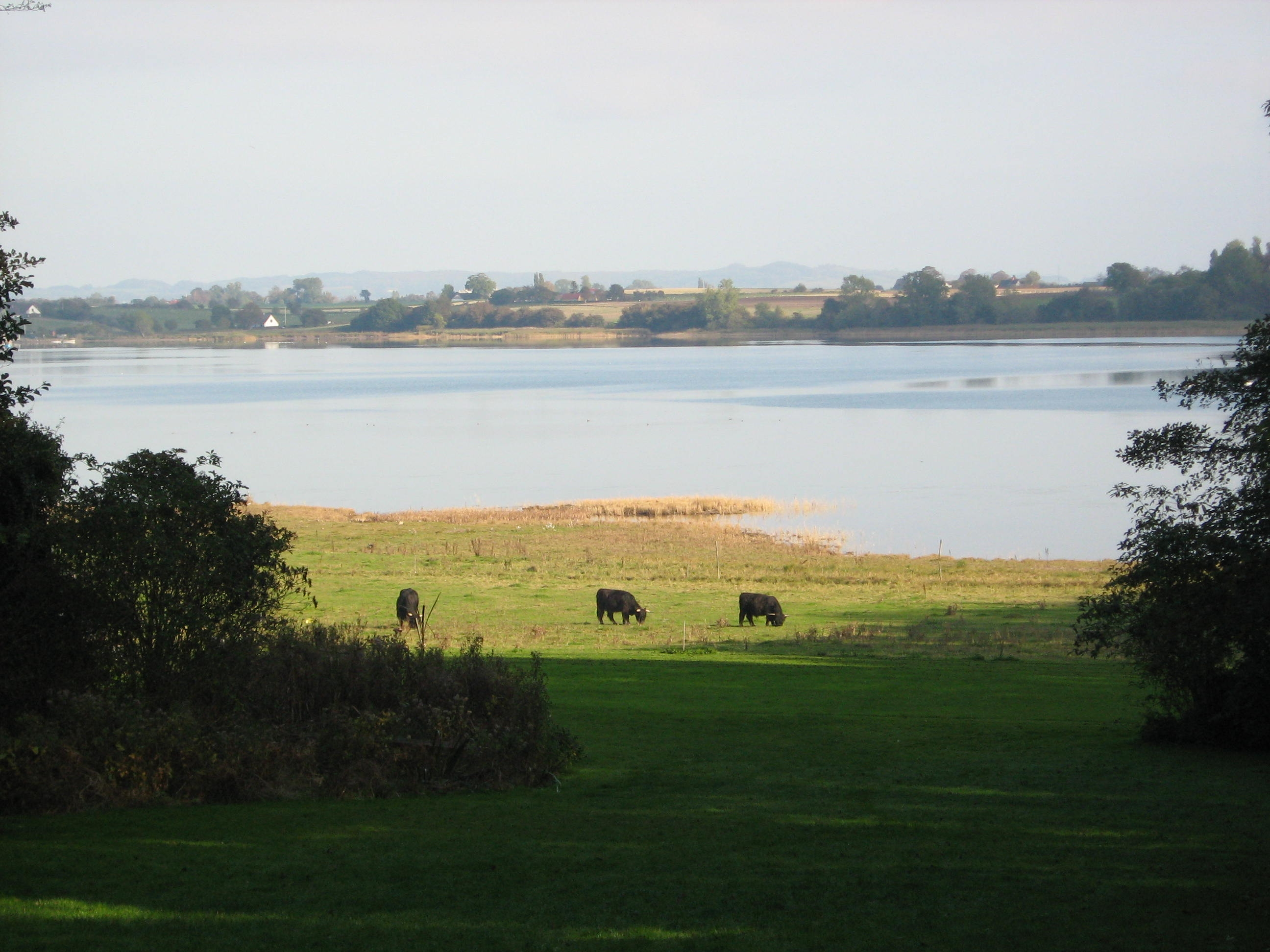
View over the lake from the school

For the first 70 years, the school offered courses to men in the winter months and women in the summer. The emphasis was on agricultural training, gardening and crafts. In 1936, there was a complete change in direction as nursing became the centre of interest, supported by the government's decision to encourage folk high schools to give preparatory courses in nursing. Rødkilde was in fact the first to make the change. Initially the school had been privately owned but as a result of the need for self-ownership in order to qualify for state grants, in 1965 ownership came into the hands of the school itself.

Once more, as a result of the new directions in government policy, the school had to find a new area of interest. Given the increasing interest in nature and the countryside, and Møn's special status in this regard, in 1981 the institution became a nature high school for a relatively short period. Initially nature courses were popular and economically successful but as time went by, with the reduction of state support for folk high schools, yet another direction had to be found. The year 1997 turned out to be a crisis year. The number of students dropped and the school's new status as an efterskole (literally "after school") would have required younger students to attend, starting at age 14 rather than 17. Moves were made to prepare for the sale of the school but, in the nick of time, contacts were made with Den nye Dramaskole (the New Drama School) which was interested in introducing drama courses at Rødkilde.

A new school board was appointed and the first drama course in the summer of 1999 turned out to be a success. The school first became known as the European Theatre High School, then in 2003, simply as the Theatre High School. Slowly the school's debts were paid off and by 2005 there was even a waiting list for student registrations.

== Architecture ==
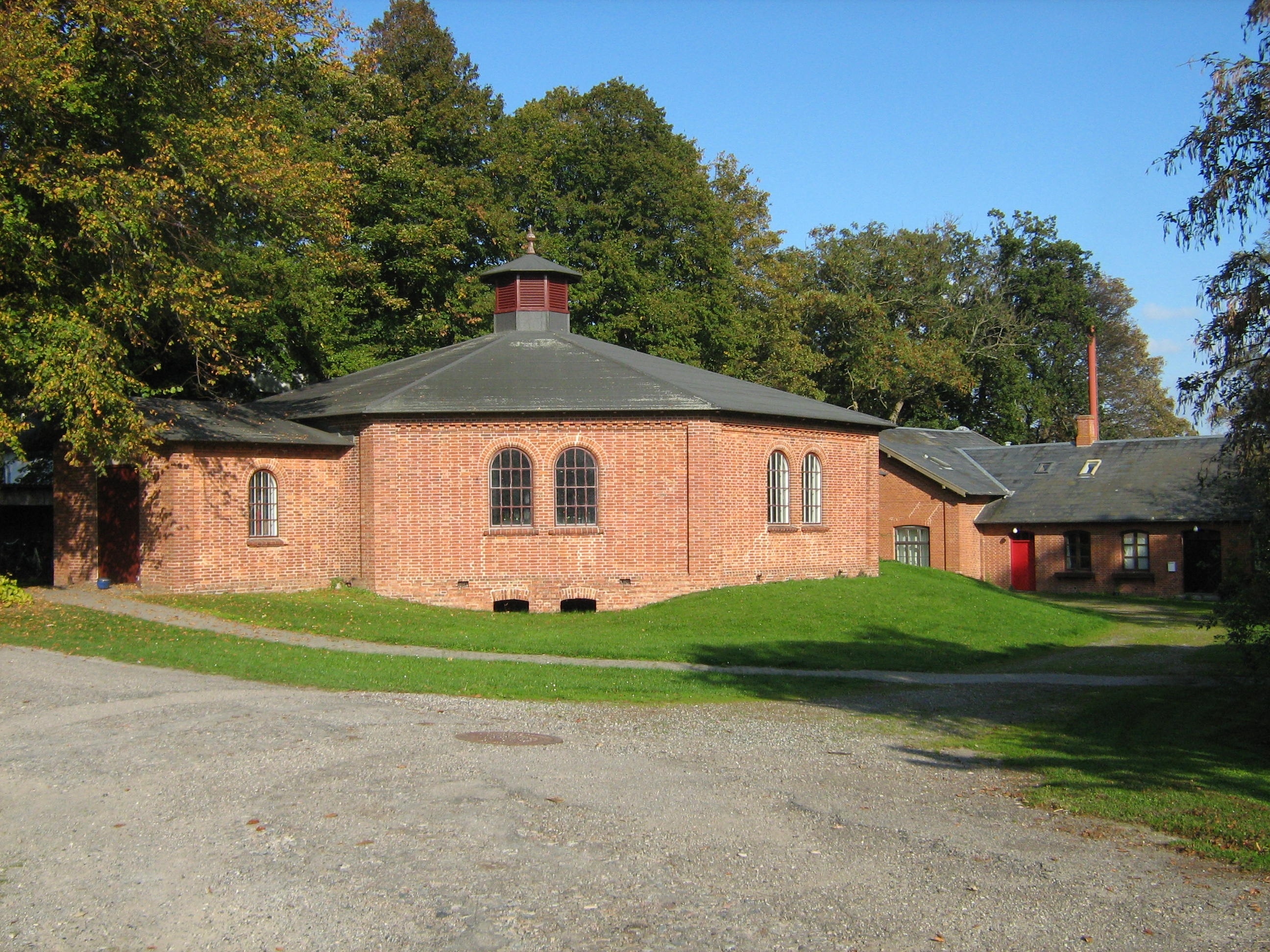
The octagonal assembly building (1868)

The basic plans for the school were sketched out by Bojsen himself. To some extent, they were based on a drawing he made a few years earlier which included a tower with a cupola similar to the one that can be seen today. He then called on Otto Michael Glahn, a local builder and architect from Nykøbing Falster. Glahn had already gained a reputation for his octagonal church on the neighbouring island of Nyord. However, while the construction work on the school was already underway, Bojsen decided to call on the services of Ludvig Fenger, a seasoned architect, to provide "exterior decorations" which would give the school the worthy look it deserved. The crow-stepped gables are certainly the work of Fenger, though they are more evocative of Denmark's old rural churches than of the historicist style for which he is remembered. The gable finishing is also strangely reminiscent of Grundtvig's pavilion at Rønnebæksholm.

The octagonal building known as the forsamlingshus was built in 1868 for the popular Wednesday evening lectures at the school. They were so popular that there was not enough room in any of the classrooms. One of very few such buildings in Denmark, it is now a listed building.

Most of the school buildings are now listed. They include the main school building, the administrative house to the south, the lecture room and the octagonal assembly building (1868), one of very few in Denmark. These buildings are now in the process of restoration.
