= Grundtvig House =

- Grundtvigs Hus
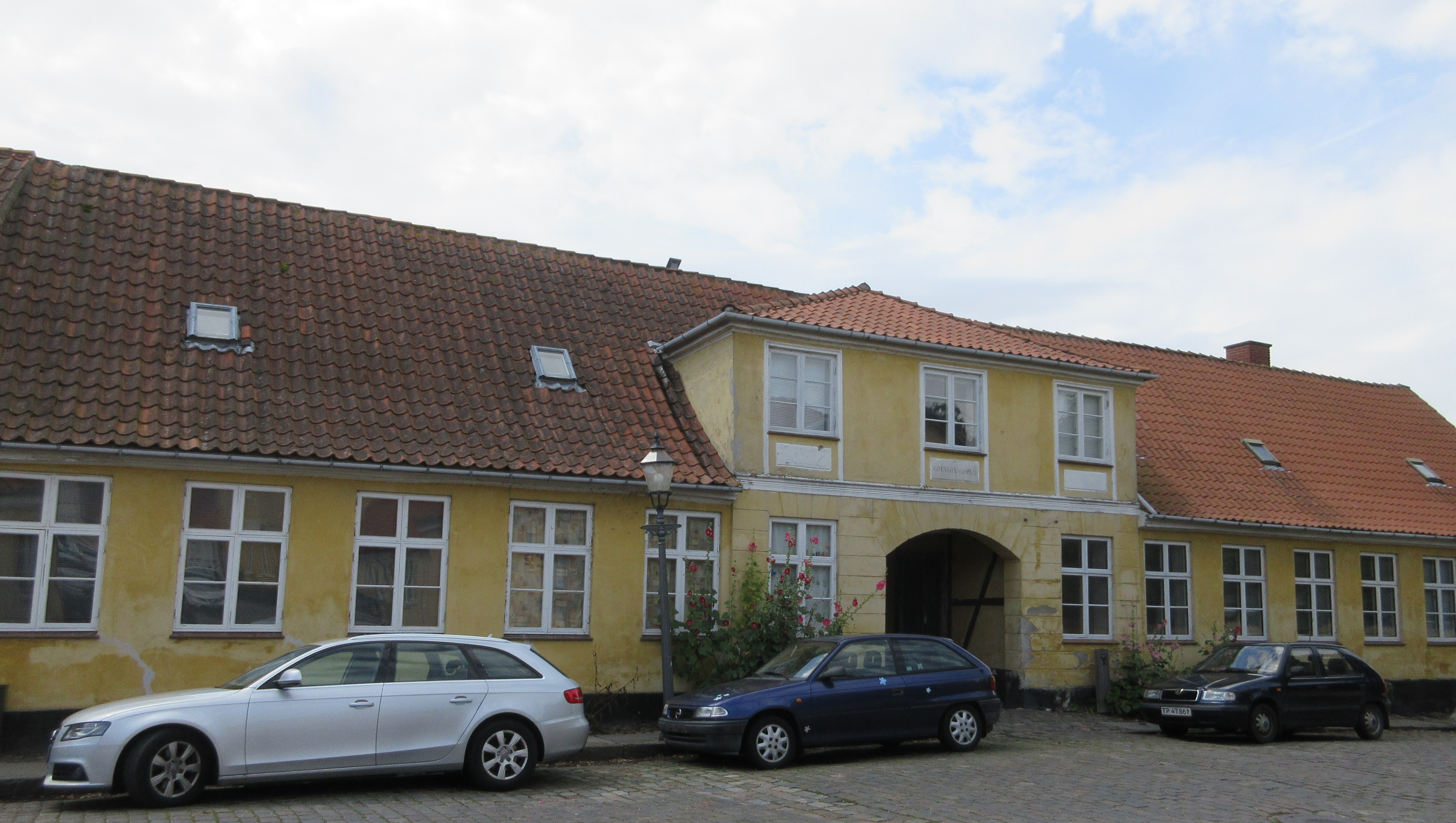

General information
- Location: Præstø
- Country: Denmark
- Coordinates: 55°7′22.84″N 12°2′29.27″E
- Completed: 1821

The Grundtvig House (Danish: Grundtvigs Hus) is a complex of historic buildings at Torvestræde 7 in Præstø, Vordingborg Municipality, Denmark. It takes its name after N. F. S. Grundtvig, who lived there for a year and a half in the early 1820s. It was listed on the Danish registry of protected buildings and places by the Agency for Culture and Palaces of Denmark on 1 March 1982.

== History ==
The house was built for the baker Frantz Dems between 1820 and 1821. The construction reused some of the timber framing from the previous building at the site.

N. F. S. Grundtvig rented an apartment in the building when he became pastor at Præstø Church in June 1821. Grundtvig returned to Copenhagen in December 1822 to assume a position as pastor at Church of Our Saciour on Christianshavn. He then lived in a now demolished building at Torvegade 25 on Christianshavn. Grundtvig was later elected for Rigsdagen in the electoral district of Præstø in 1849.

Niels Hansen, a later owner of the building and master buildier, expanded the building northwards with two extensions in 1856. He also constructed a new side wing in 1862 from where he operated a brewery.

== Architecture ==
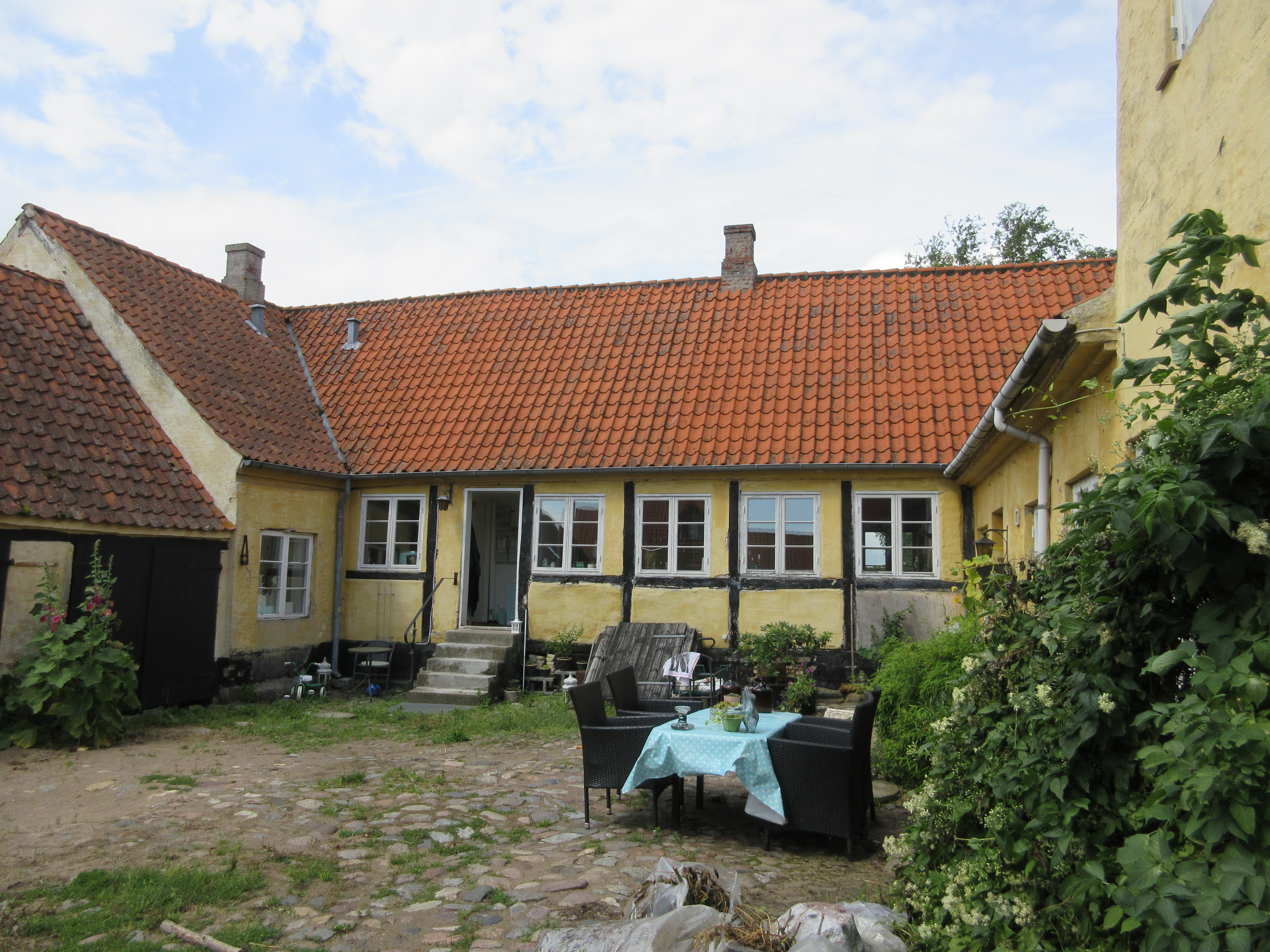
The side wing

The Grundtvig House is a long one-storey brick building with yellow rendering on a black-painted foundation. It has a three-bay wall dormer above the centrally placed, arched gateway that opens to the courtyard. The side wing from 1862 is built with timber framing on a black-painted brick foundation.

== See also ==
- Grundtvig Pavilion at Rønnebæksholm
