= Præstø Town Hall =

Building in Præstø, Denmark

- Præstø Rådhus
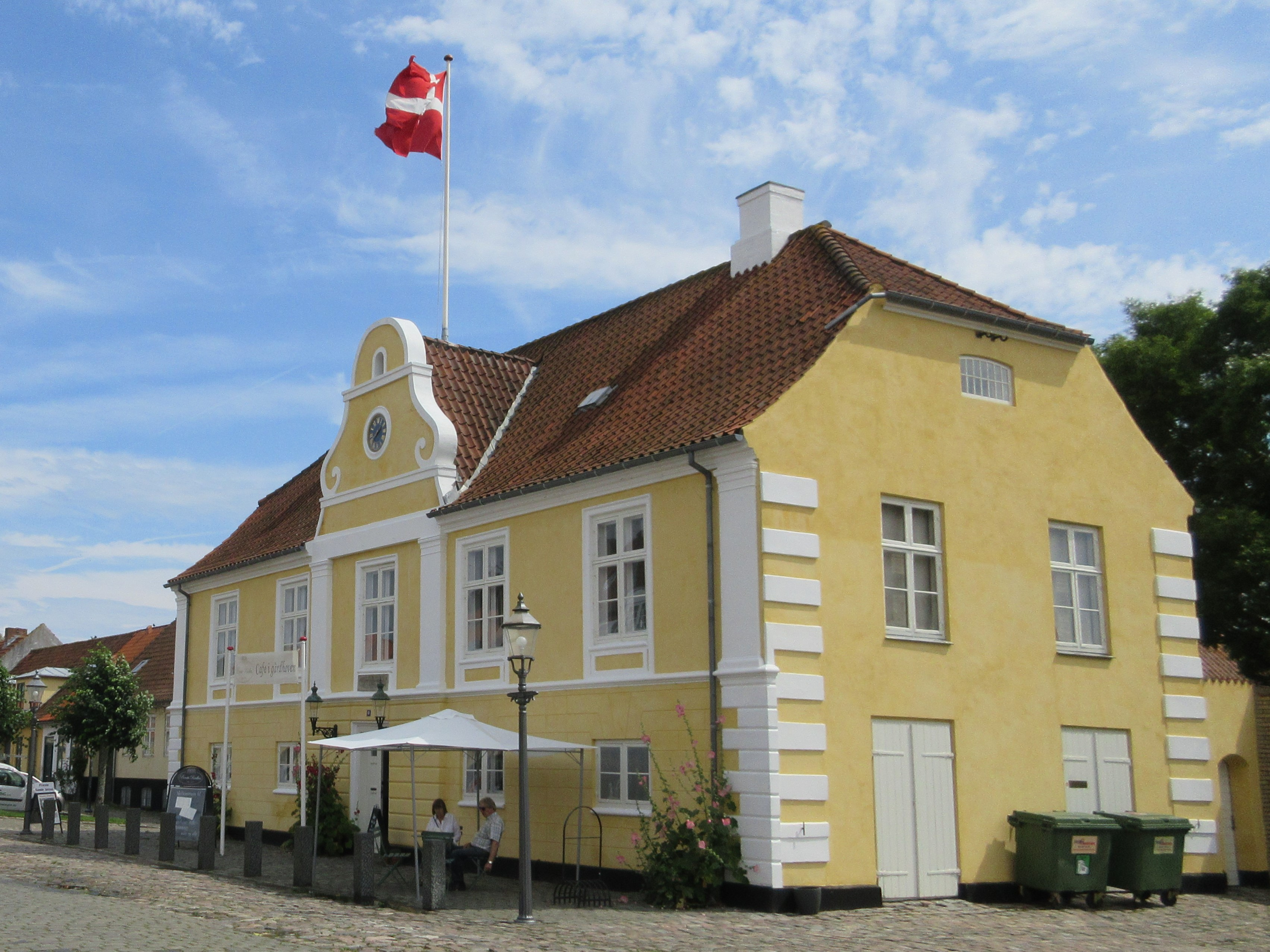
- Interactive map of the Præstø Town Hall area

General information
- Architectural style: Neoclassical
- Location: Præstø, Denmark
- Coordinates: 55°7′24.62″N 12°2′38.32″E
- Completed: 1923–24 (town hall); 1850 (jailhouse)

Præstø Town Hall Danish: Præstø Rådhus) is the former town hall of Præstø, now part of Vordingborg Municipality, in southeastern Denmark. The building dates from 1824 but owes its current appearance to an adaption in 1868. A jailhouse wing projects from its rear side.

== History ==
Præstø was incorporated as a market town in 1403. After being hit by flooding, major fires and siege by invading Swedish troops, it had become a rather poor town with around 400 residents when the merchant H. C. Grønvold established a facility for salting herring and started a largescale export of grain in the early 19th century.

Grønvold was also involved in the construction of the town hall in collaboration with the master carpenter Hans Andersen. The local bailiff Jacob Møller had previously sent in a rendering to Danske Kancelli and it had later been adjusted by Christian Frederik Hansen. The town hall was expanded with a jailhouse wing in 1850 and the town hall's facade on the square was adapted in 1868.

The jailhouse was adapted for use as sloyd premises for the local school in the 1950s. The prison cells were used by the pupils for storing their works. The building was later used as storage space by Civilforsvaret and since the 1990s as storage space by the local theatre group.

In the 1970 Danish Municipal Reform, the market town of Præstø was merged with the civil parishes of Allerslev, Beldringe, Bårse, Jungshoved and Skibinge to form Præstø Municipality. The town hall was decommissioned when Præstø was merged into Vordingborg Municipality in 2007. In 2015, Vordingborg Municipality decided to sell the building. The buyer was Jakob Helles, the owner of a local real estate company.

== Architecture ==
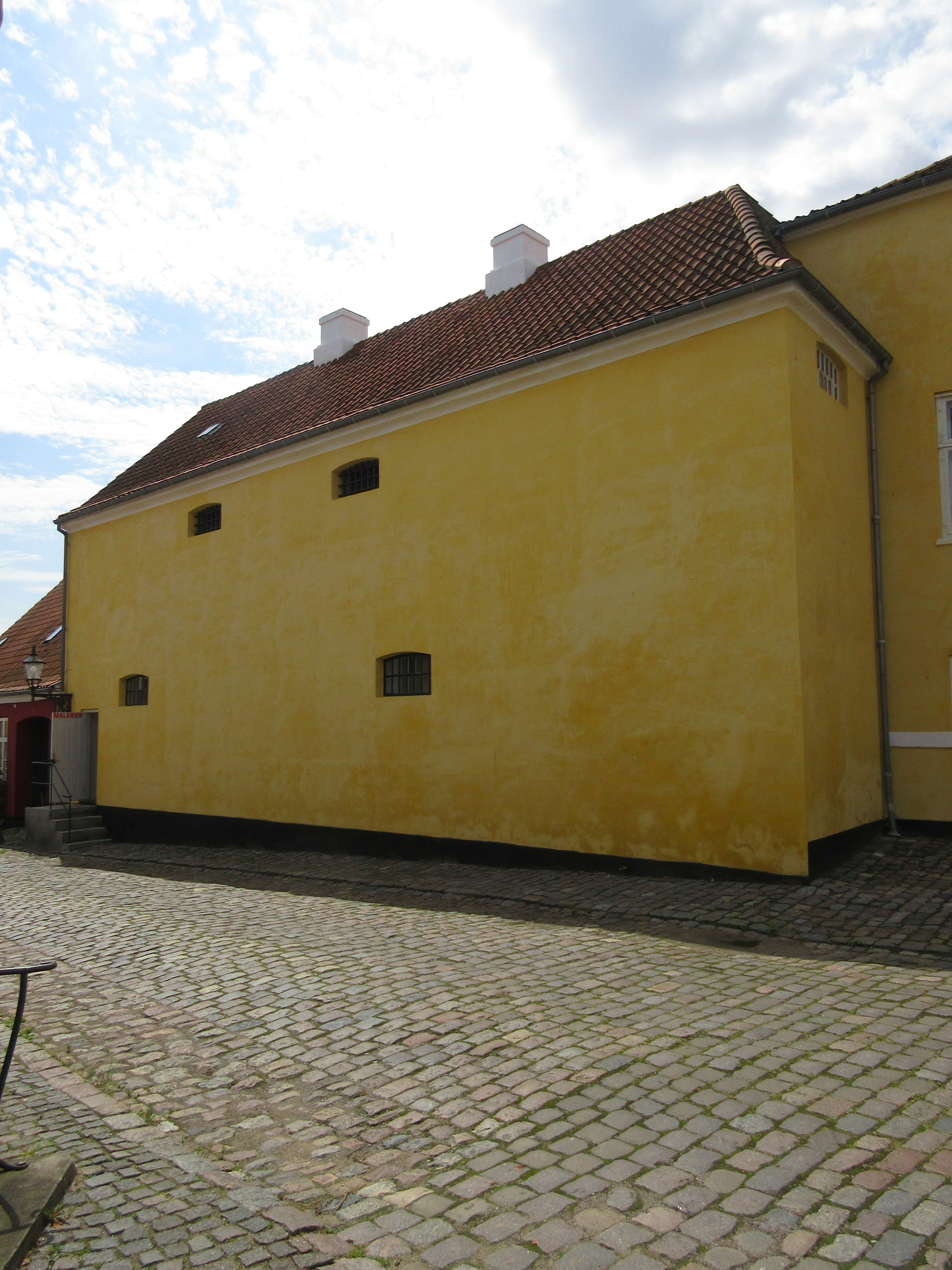
The jailhouse wing seen from the square

Møller's rendering was a copy of a rendering from 1803 made by the Viborg architect Willads Stilling for a new town hall in Nykøbing Mors. It is unclear how much of the original design has survived since the rendering has been lost and no images from before the 1868 renovation exist. The gabled wall dormer above the main entrance dates from the renovation, and it is believed that all the other decorations on the facade do so as well.

== Today ==
The building contains a restaurant on the ground floor.

== Cultural references ==
The building has been used as a location in the films Den gamle mølle paa Mols (1953)m Kristiane af Marstal (1956), Landsbylægen (1961), Affæren i Mølleby (1976) and Slægten (1978).
