= Tærø =

Island

Coordinates: 54°57′N 12°06′E

Tærø's location

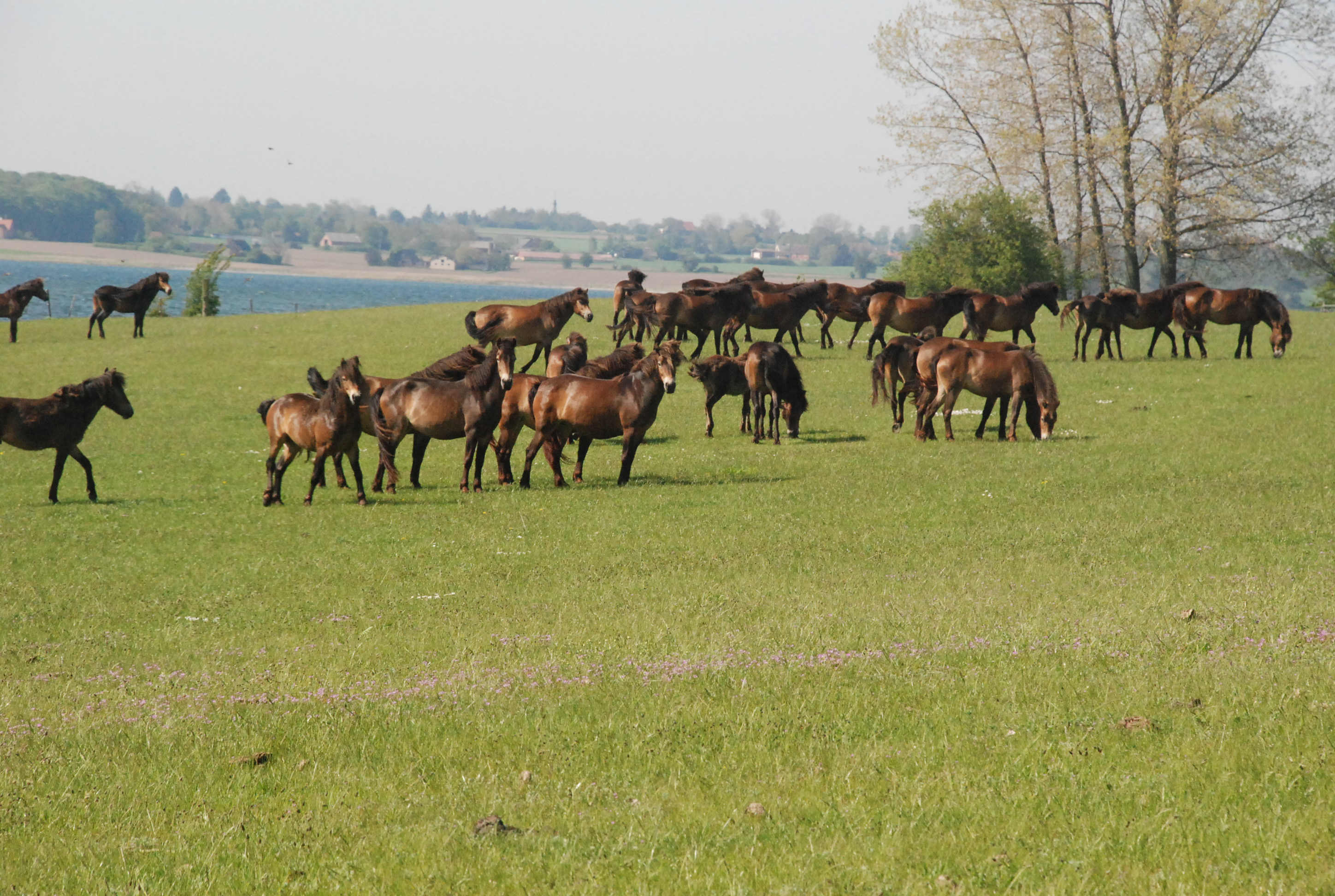
Ponies on the island

Tærø (Danish pronunciation: [ˈtsʰeːˌʁøˀ]) is a small Danish island in the Ulvsund Strait (Baltic Sea) between Zealand and Møn, not far from Bogø and the Farø Bridges. Located in Vordingborg Municipality, the island has an area of 173 hectares (430 acres). As of January 2025 there was only one inhabitant registered on the island.

The island is formed by two glacial moraine hills surrounded by coastal meadows and small headlands. Access to the island is from the harbour at Petersværft on Zealand.

== Tærø today ==
Tærø is privately owned and (as of 2010) most of it is grazed by 180 head of Scottish highland cattle from Tærø Avlsgard, the only farm on the island.

There are also approximately 25 Exmoor ponies roaming freely on the island. They were introduced in the 1960s by a group of researchers. In 2003 some of the horses were moved to Klise Nor on Langeland.

== Round Tærø Race ==
Every year in June, the boat club on neighbouring Bogø arranges the Round Tærø boat race. In 2010, it took place for the 21st time. There are individual competitions for keel boats, motorboats and multihulled boats.

== See also ==
- List of islands of Denmark
