= Liselund Ny Slot =

Italian-styled manor house on the Danish island of Møn

Coordinates: 54°59′27″N 12°31′33″E

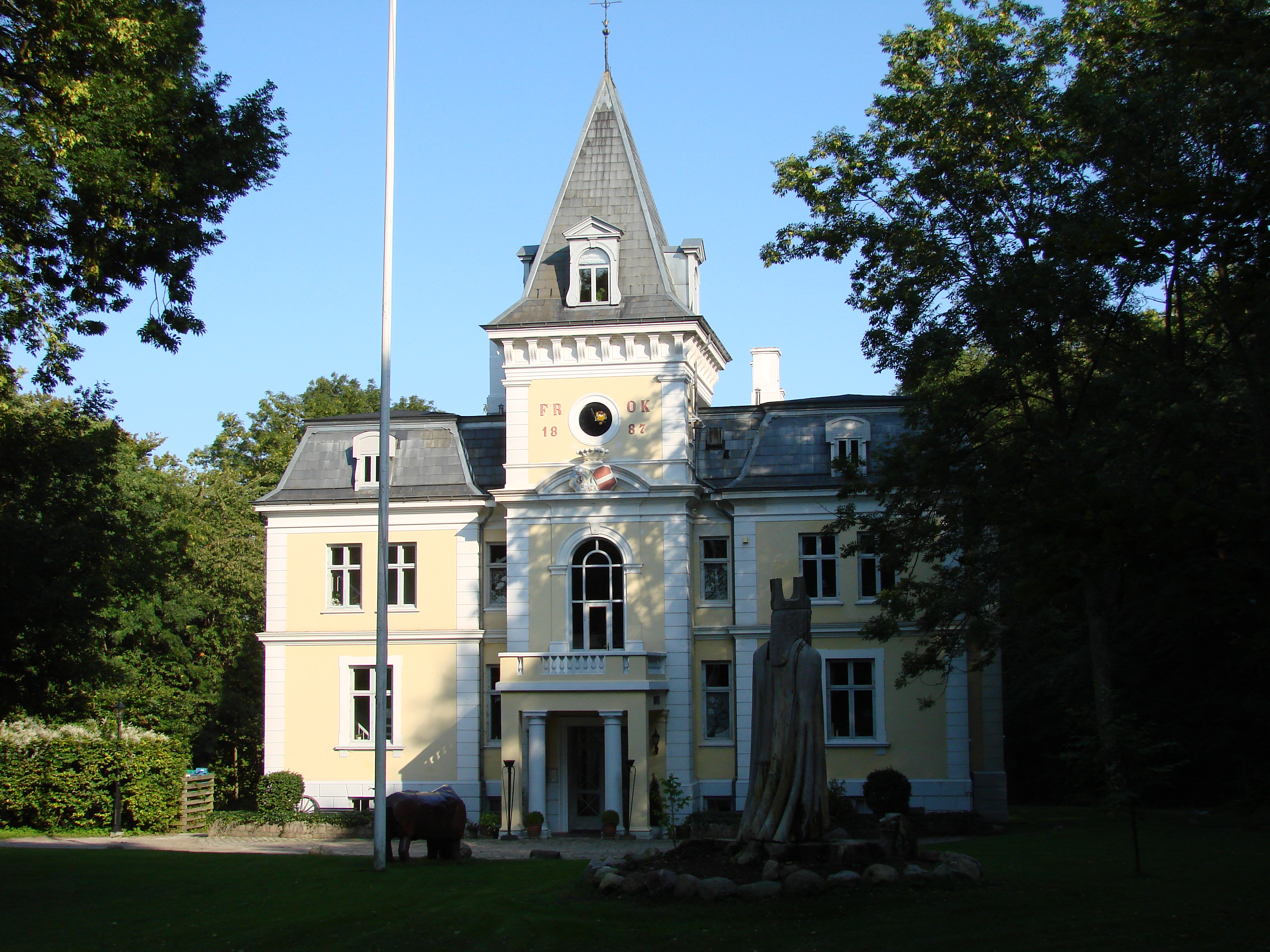
Liselund Ny Slot

Liselund Ny Slot (Liselund New Manor) is an Italian-styled manor house located in the Liselund park on the Danish island of Møn.

== History ==
In 1884, Fritz Rosenkrantz bought Liselund from Gottlob Rosenkrantz and his wife Elisabth. In 1887, he built the new three-winged manor at the top of the park's western slope overlooking the lake. Decorated with fine ceiling frescos, stucco and wall panels, the New Manor was used by the Rosenkranz family until the 1960s when the family moved to Liselund Avlsgård as the building was considered too old to inhabit. It was used as a youth hostel for a time but was sold to the State in 1980. After lying empty for many years, it was bought by Krista and Steffen Steffensen in 1989 who converted it into an attractive hotel.

== See also ==
- Liselund
