= Nyord =

- Island
- Nyord island (center) is north of Møn
- Coordinates: 55°3′0″N 12°13′0″E
- Country: Denmark
- Municipality: Vordingborg municipality

Area
  - Total: 5 km^{2} (1.9 sq mi)
- Time zone: UTC+1 (CET)
  - Summer (DST): UTC+2 (CEST)
- Postal codes: 4780 Stege
- Protection status

Ramsar Wetland
- Official name: Præsto Fjord, Jungshoved Nor, Ulvshale and Nyord
- Designated: 2 September 1977
- Reference no.: 161

Nyord (Danish pronunciation: [ˈnyˌoɐ̯ˀ]) is a Danish island in the Baltic Sea, southeast of Zealand, just north of Møn island.

Nyord covers an area of approximately 5 km², although only 1.2 km² is cultivatable moraine, while the remaining 4 km² is salt-meadow which is used for summer grazing, but is flooded during the winter.

The island is reached by a narrow bridge from the larger island of Møn. The bridge was constructed in 1968 and replaced the post boat Røret which had been in service since 1902. The boat was not large enough for animals such as cattle or horses, which had to swim alongside the boat.

== History ==
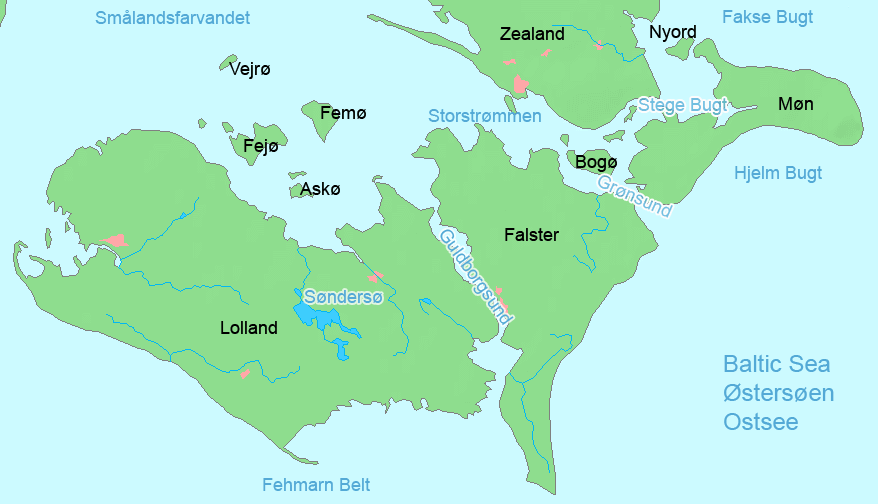
Nyord (upper right) between Møn & Zealand.

Traditionally the island has been self-sufficient, relying upon farming, fishing and piloting. Prior to 1769, the island belonged to the crown, but at this time crown lands were sold off, and the islanders purchased their own island for 3903 rigsdaler. The waters around the island are sufficiently treacherous that islanders could gain a livelihood as pilots, and this became enshrined in law as both a right and duty of the islanders between 1748 and 1879. After 1879, pilots were employed directly by the government instead of earning individual fees. A number of pilots houses and a lookout were constructed when the government took over the service. Piloting ceased in 1966.

The village of Nyord remains similar to its original design, with traditional thatched cottages and farm houses. It has a church, museum and small harbour. There is a restaurant Lolles Gård which is both a farm and a restaurant, there also is a village shop. The marshland area crossed by the bridge from the main island has one of Denmark's most important habitats for geese, ducks and other wading birds. There is an observation tower for birdwatchers to use.

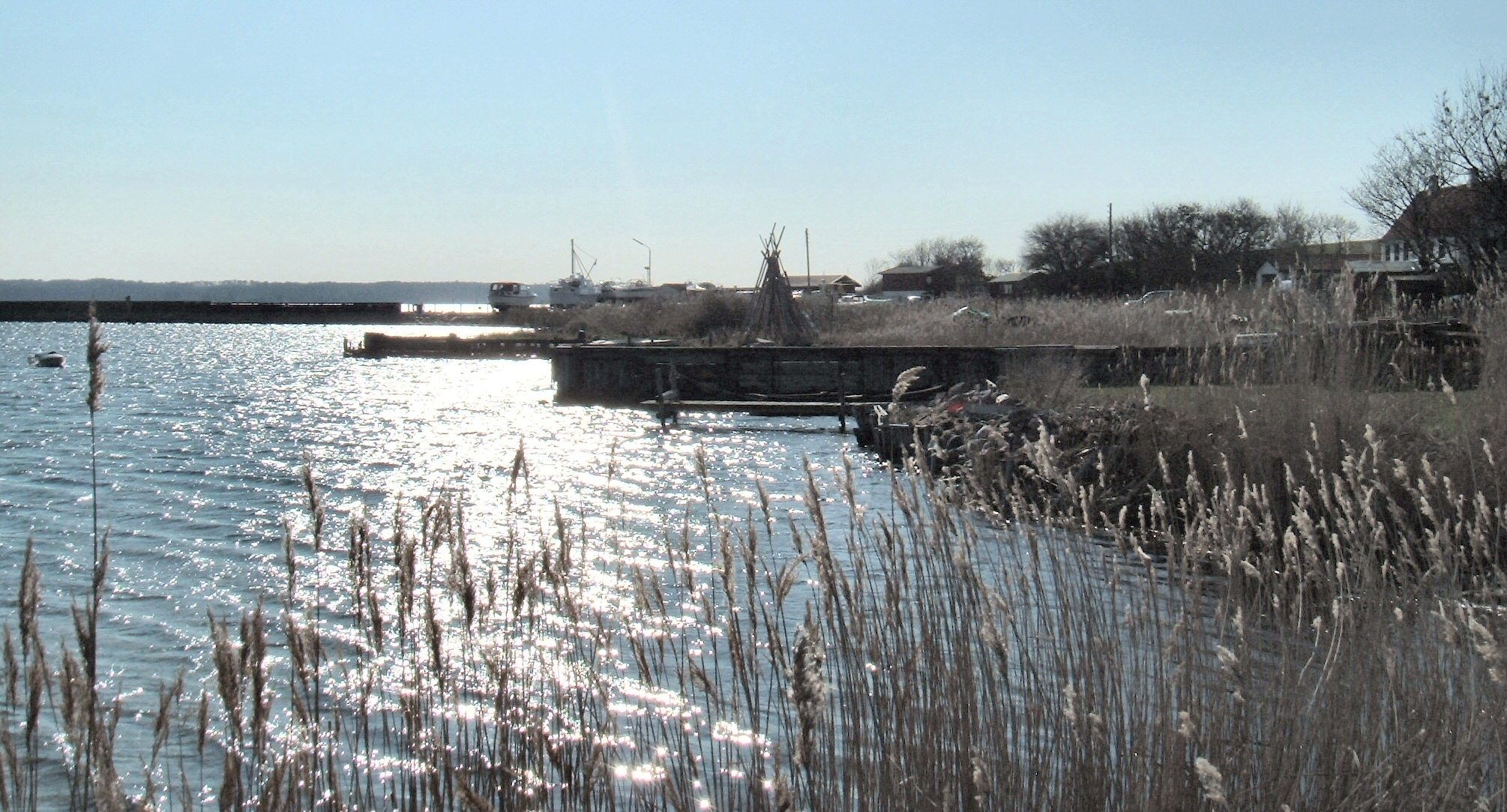
View along the coast in Nyord looking towards the harbour

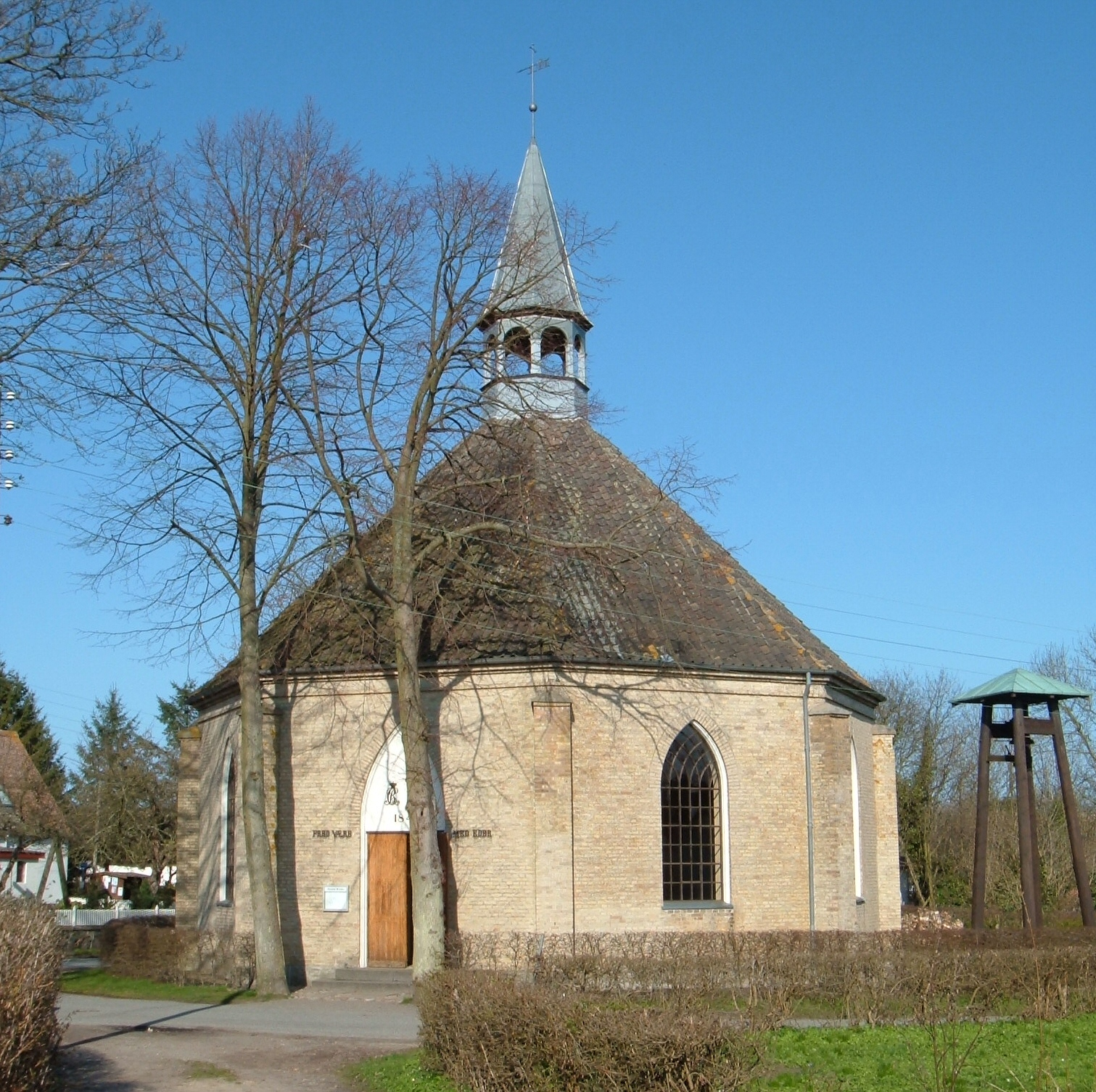
Nyord church

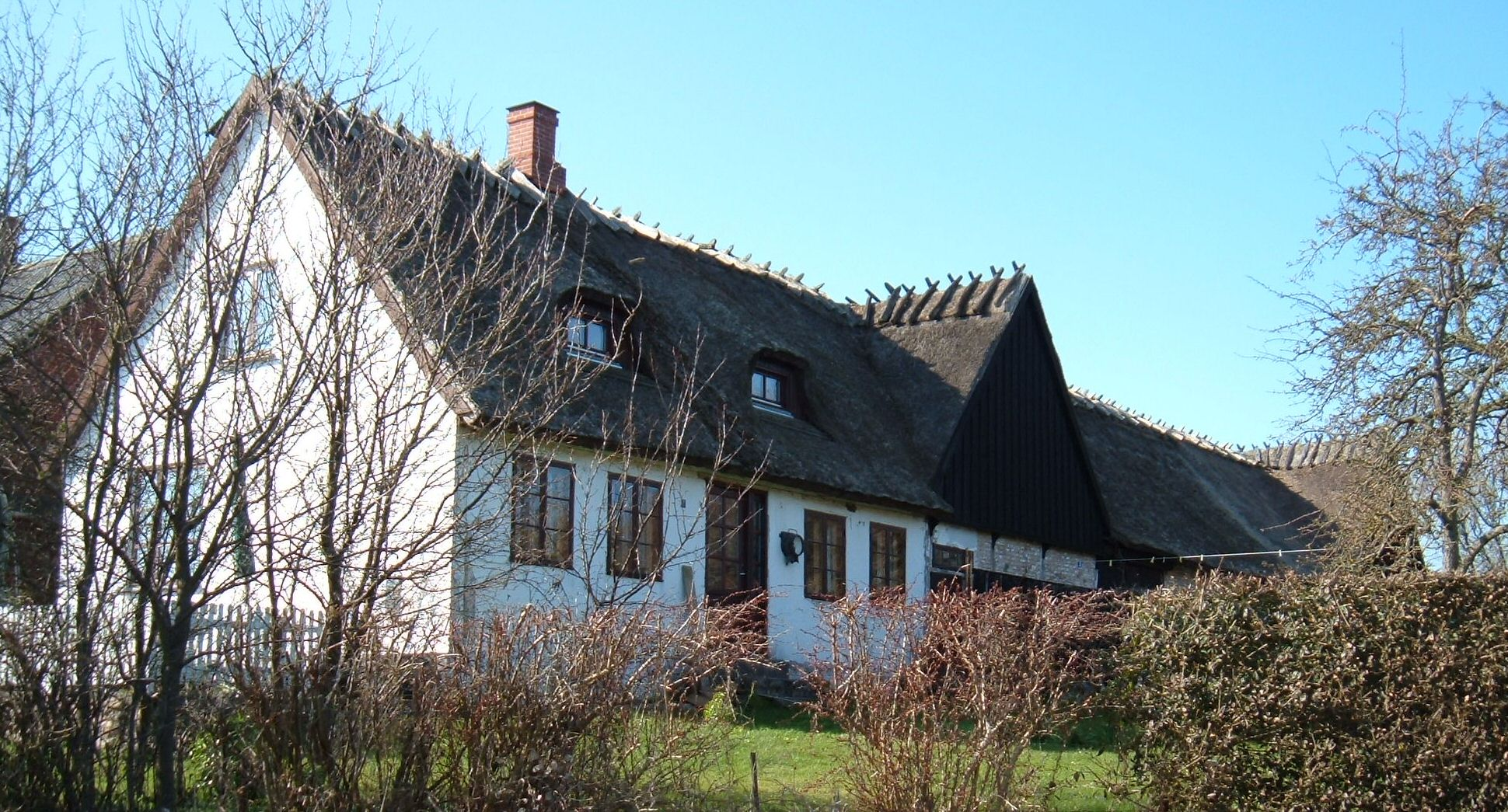
Typical house in Nyord

== See also ==
- List of islands of Denmark.
- Ulvshale, adjacent to Nyord on the island of Møn.
