= Church frescos in Denmark =

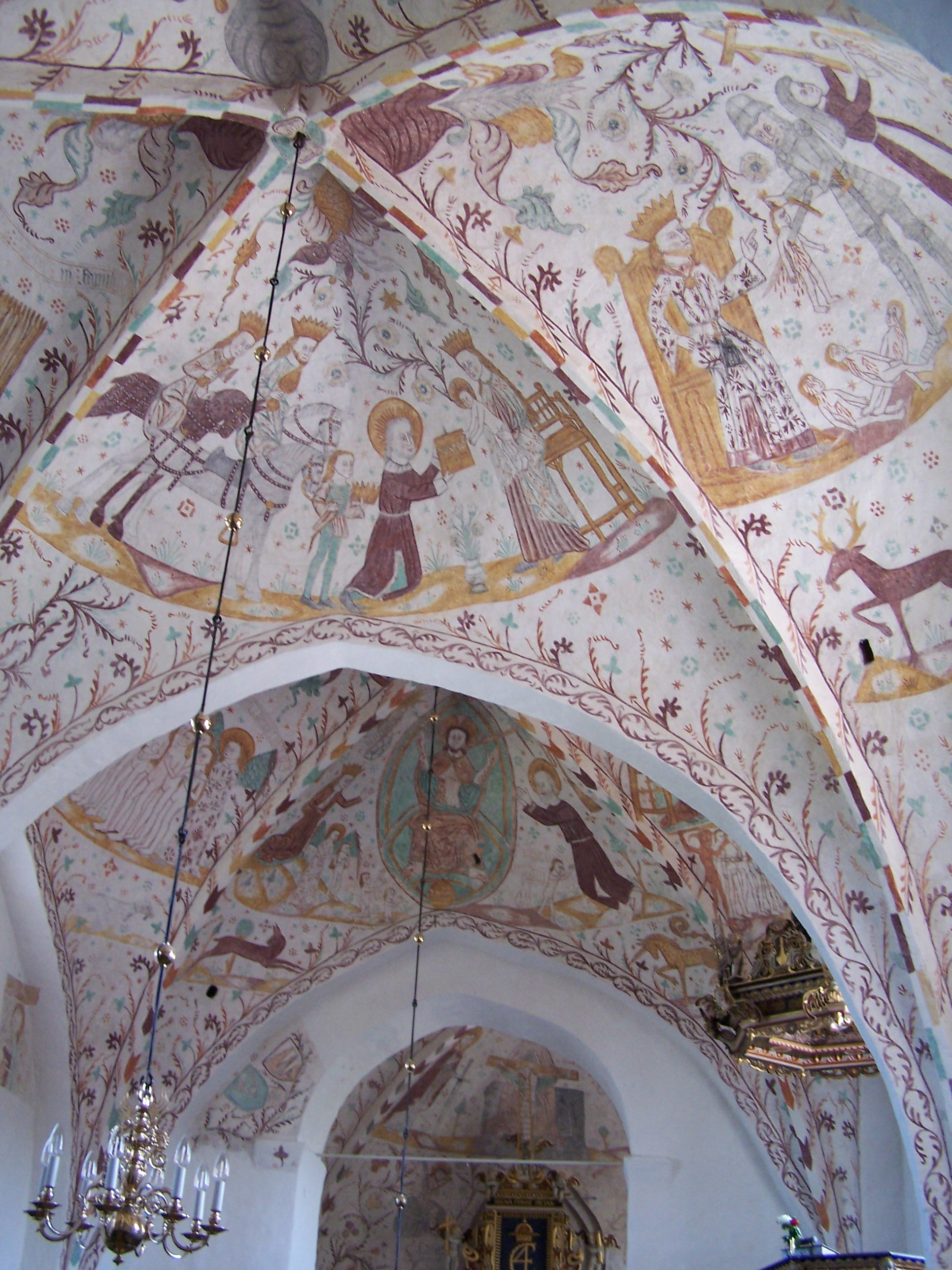
Gothic frescos in Elmelunde Church

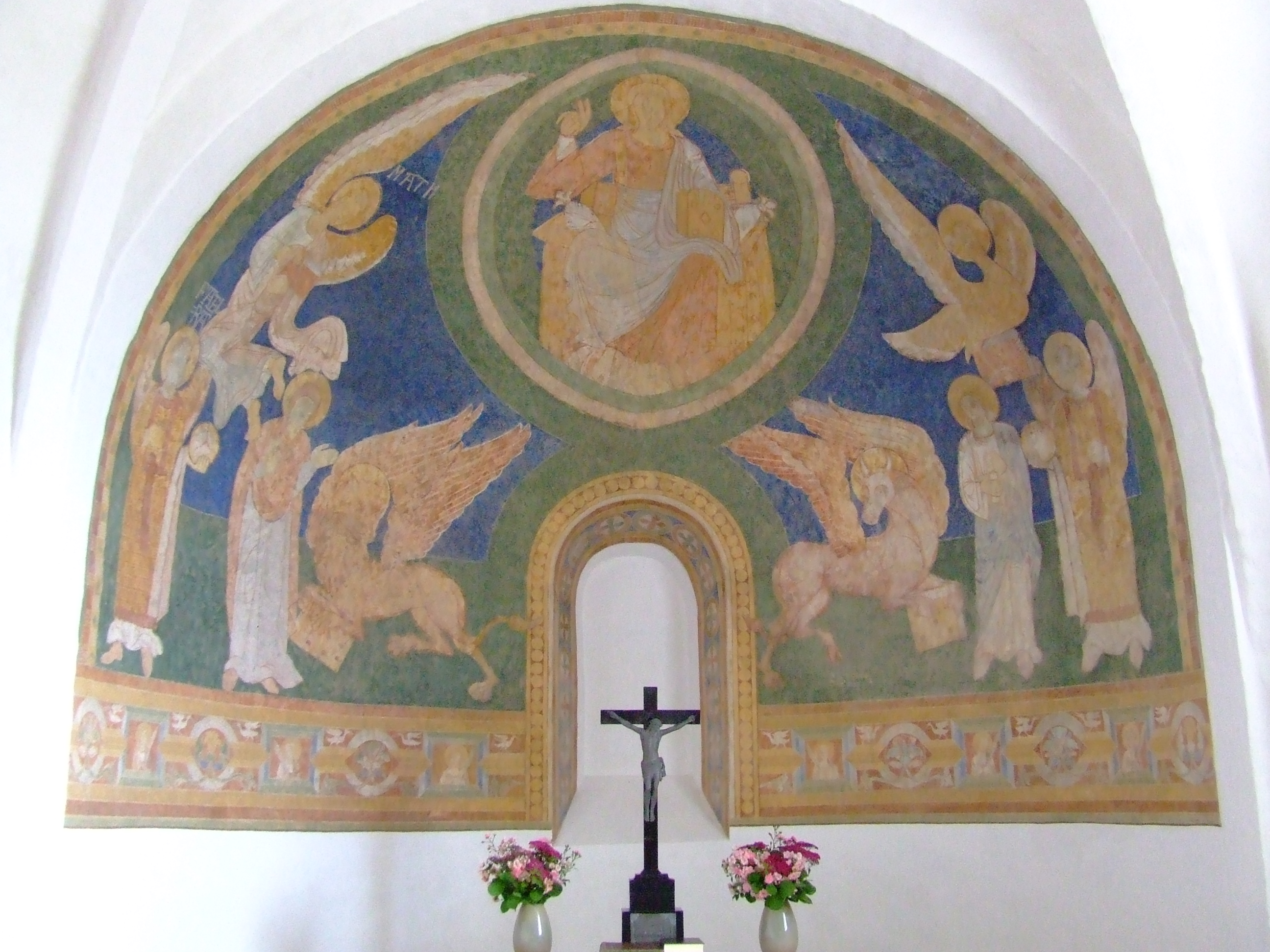
Sealand-type Romanesque Christ in Majesty at Alsted.

Church wall paintings (Danish: kalkmalerier) are to be found in some 600 churches across Denmark, no doubt representing the highest concentration of surviving church murals anywhere in the world. Most of them date back to the Middle Ages and were uncovered by Jacob Kornerup (1825–1913) who carried out restoration work in 80 churches across the country towards the end of the 19th century. They lay hidden for centuries as after the reformation, they were covered with limewash (Danish: kalk) only to be revealed and restored during the course of the 19th and 20th centuries. The oldest frescos, dating back to the 12th century, were painted in the Romanesque style by artists from elsewhere in Europe but those from the 14th century and thereafter are in the Gothic style which was used by native Danish painters. It is these that are considered to be the most important for Danish art and culture. A distinction is to be made between these church wall paintings or kalkmalerier and the generic term "fresco" (Danish: fresko) which refers to all types of painting on plastered walls or ceilings.

== Historical background ==
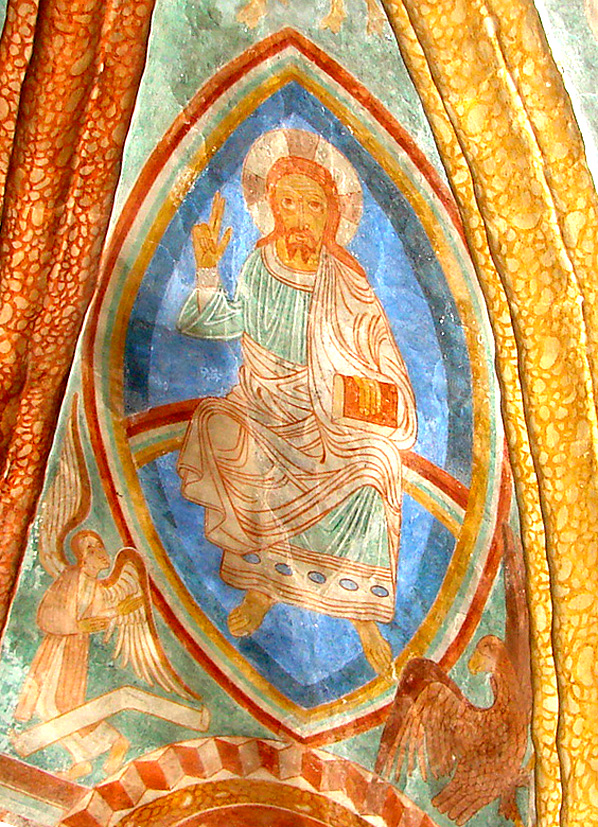
Grønbæk: Romanesque frescos

The murals in Danish churches can be divided very roughly into two main periods: Romanesque, beginning in the 12th century, and Gothic, from the middle of the 13th century. As in most of Europe the transition in painting styles was less abrupt than in architecture. Painting styles are closely related to those of the neighbouring areas of North Germany and South Sweden, especially the province of Scania, which was Danish territory in the Middle Ages.

=== Romanesque period ===
With the development of Christianity and the construction of stone churches, Romanesque art came to Denmark from the rest of Europe, with influences mostly from North Germany and the Anglo-Norman English Channel area, and possibly even some from Spain and Italy. Some of this no doubt came from imported manuscripts; there are no surviving "indigenous illuminated manuscripts of significance" from Scandinavia in this period. Many of the churches in Sealand, especially those in Måløv, Jørlunde, Slaglille, Sæby and Kirke Hyllinge, have highly artistic murals dating back to the 12th century. The colours were often imported at considerable cost and the paintings, usually of figures, were true frescos, completed on wet plaster in traditionally geometrical compositions with a blue or green background. Several Sealand church apses have a variant of the usual Christ in Majesty subject, where Christ is surrounded by the Evangelists' symbols, flanked by the Virgin and Saint John with archangels or other figures (Alsted shown above).

=== Gothic period ===
There was a lengthy but smooth transition towards Gothic art, beginning in the middle of the 13th century but extending well into the 15th when many of the flat wooden church ceilings were replaced by brick vaulting. The curvature of the vaults called for new techniques rather than simply following pictures from illuminated manuscripts. The figures no longer stand in a coloured background but are painted directly on the white limewash. Increasingly, the white areas between the figures are filled with stars, flowers, plants and other ornaments. The figures often appear more conventional than in the Romanesque murals. Gothic church murals are found throughout Denmark and in the south of Sweden, and can often be identified as coming from workshops such as the ones in Elmelunde on the island of Møn and Isefjord in northwestern Sealand. Knights in combat became regarded as a suitable subject for church walls.

=== Post-Reformation ===
The Reformation essentially ended the traditions of church wall-paintings in all Protestant counties. The large anti-Catholic fresco, following a print of 1525 by Sebald Beham, in the parish church of Brøns is one of few such works in Europe.

== Notable examples of wall paintings ==
In many of Denmark's churches, wall paintings have been restored. Listed below are some of the most interesting examples:

=== Aarhus Cathedral ===
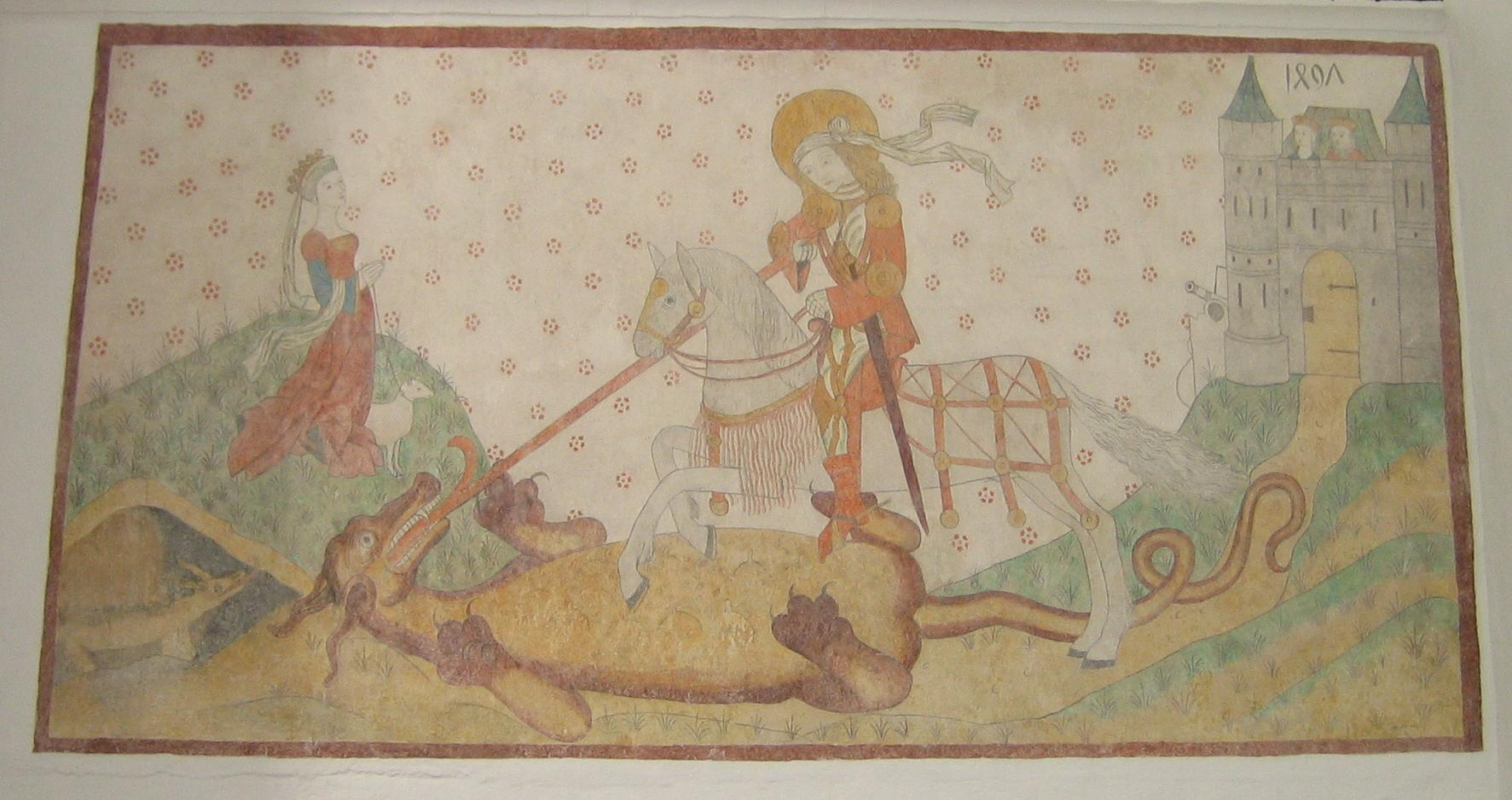
St. George in Aarhus Cathedral

The murals in Aarhus Cathedral date from 1470 to 1520. Until the Reformation, most of the church's walls were covered in frescos but many were lost. The cathedral still has 220 m^{2} of frescoes, more than any other church in Denmark. One pre-1470 painting was saved from the first Romanesque-style cathedral in the northwest corner, the so-called Lazarus Window, painted about 1300.

The paintings of St Christopher and St Clement are the tallest in the country. Other figures include St Michael and St George with the dragon (pictured).

Fresco in Sulsted Church

=== Sulsted Church ===
Sulsted is a small Danish town just north of Aalborg in Jutland. The church, built during the second half of the 12th century, is richly decorated with late-Gothic frescos, all painted by Hans Maler from Randers in 1548.

Unlike other frescos in Danish churches, these were not concealed with limewash after the reformation and have survived to this day.

The frescos, which decorate the ceiling of the nave, depict the Life of Christ starting with his birth in the first section at the west end of the nave, continue with the beginning of his Passion in the second or central section and end with his death on the cross in the third most easterly section. Those in the choir are of other New Testament images related to the creed and to the Life of the Virgin.

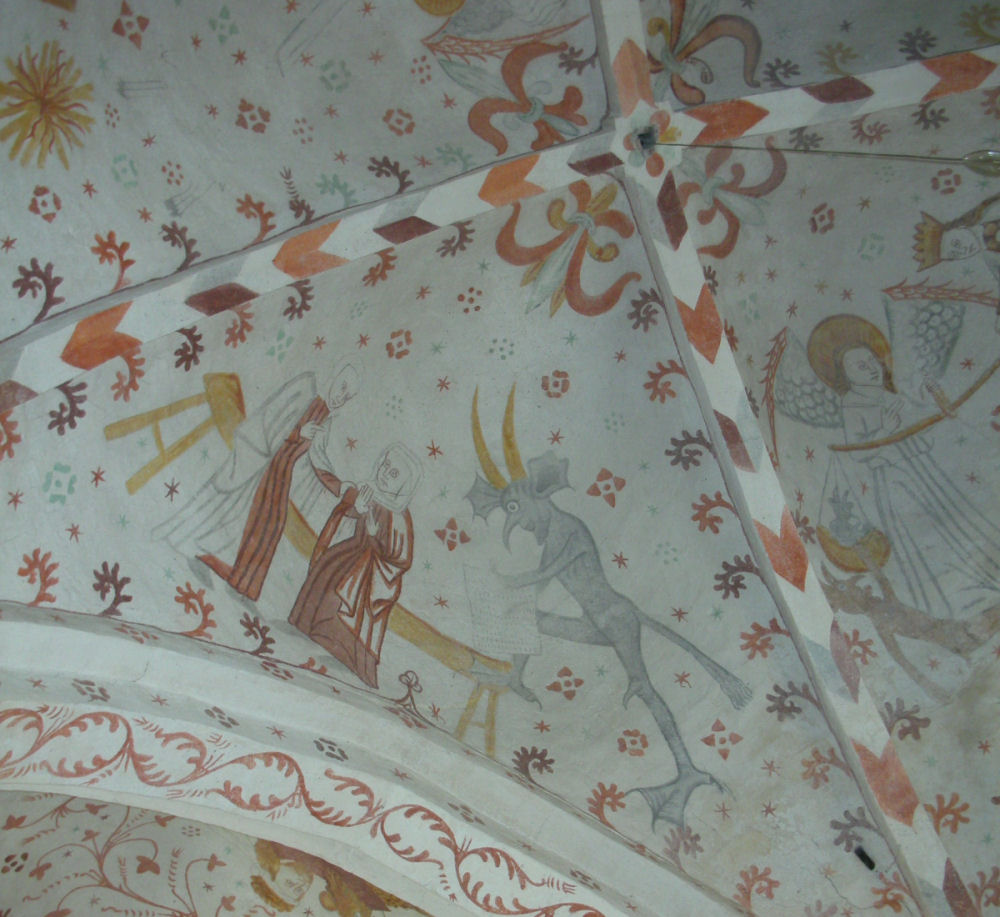
Fanefjord: the cross vaults

=== Fanefjord Church ===
Fanefjord Church on the island of Møn in southeastern Denmark is richly decorated with frescos which were uncovered from 1932 to 1934 under the guidance of the National Museum. In 2009, major restoration work was completed on the frescos, revealing their original colours and impact.

The earliest paintings, on the triumphal arch, were created around 1350. They depict the Four Evangelists, as well as St Christopher and St George. The most famous frescos are however those dating back to about 1500 which cover large areas of the church's ceiling and upper walls. In the so-called Biblia pauperum style, they present many of the most popular stories from the Old and New Testaments in typological juxtapositions. The artist, who can be identified by his emblem, is known simply as the Elmelunde Master as it was he who also painted the frescos in Møn's Elmelunde Church. The warm colours ranging from dark red and russet to yellow, green, grey and black are distinctive.

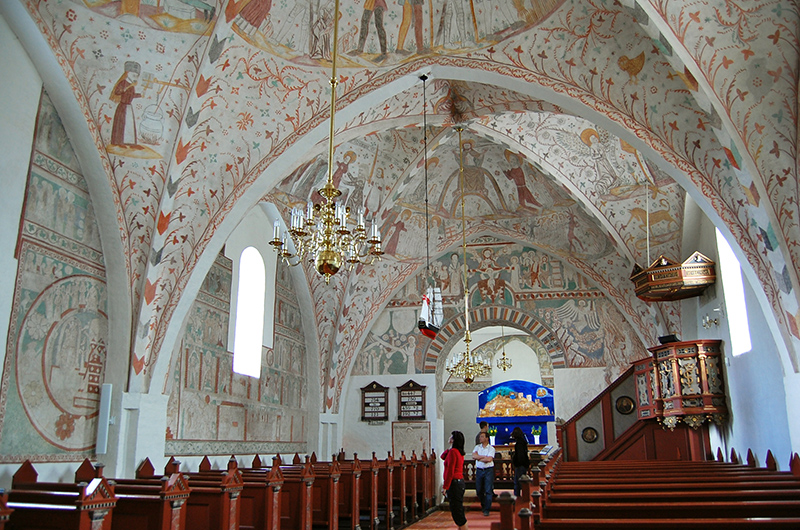
Keldby Church: the nave

=== Keldby Church ===
Keldby Church, 4 km east of Stege, is one of the three churches on Møn decorated by the Elmelunde Master, probably towards the end of the 15th century. In the so-called Biblia pauperum style, the paintings present many of the most popular stories from the Old and New Testaments. There are also a number of earlier frescos in the church dating back to about 1275.

== Example in Scania ==
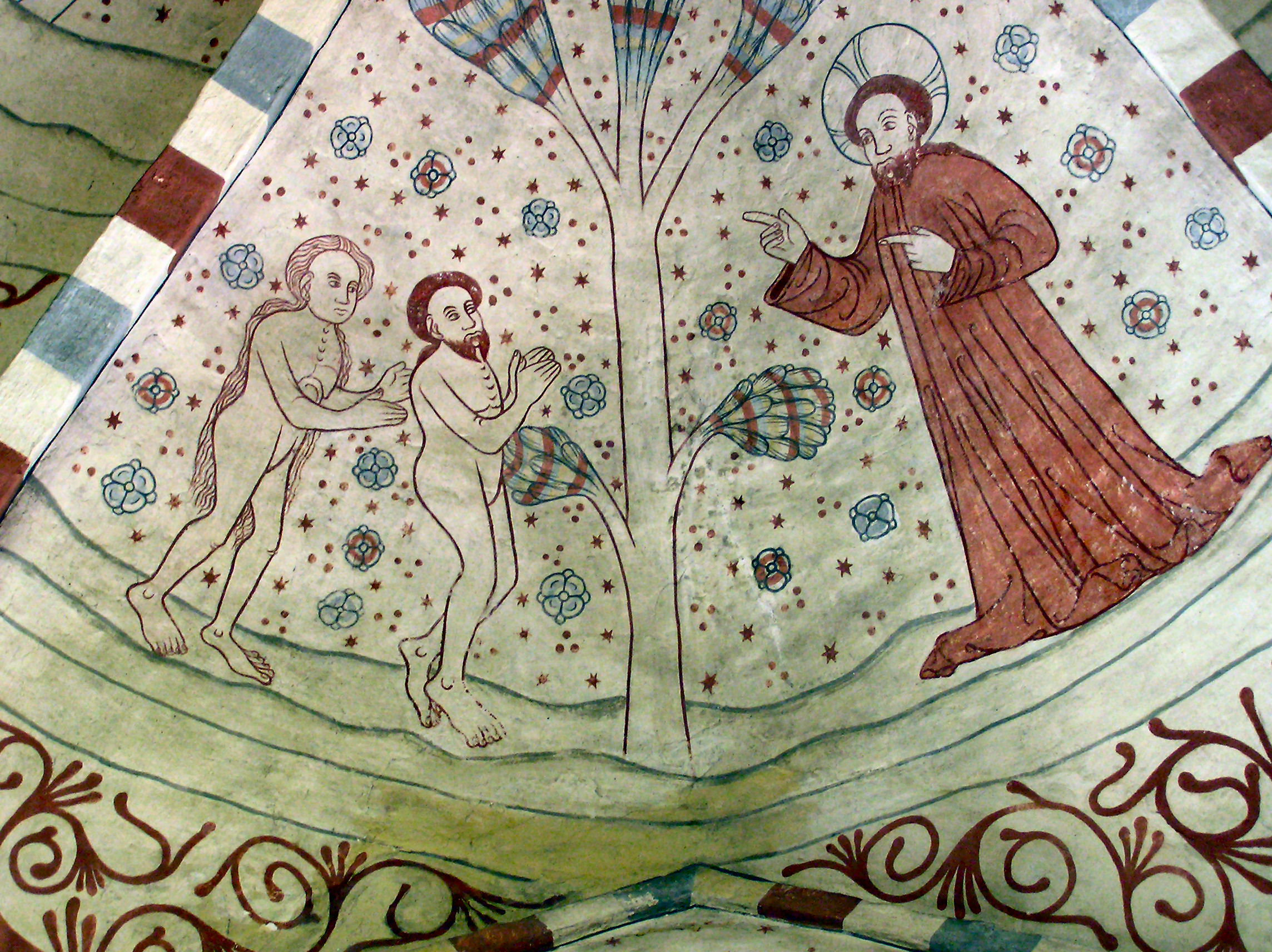
Vittskövle Church: The tree of Knowledge

Scania, in the south of Sweden, was a Danish province until 1658. Many of its churches are decorated with frescos, very similar in style to those of Denmark.

=== Vittskövle Church ===
The church in Vittskövle, a small village near Kristianstad, has a wide variety of wall paintings dating back to the 15th century. They are contained principally in the cross vaults above the nave. The most notable examples are those of the Creation and the Fall.

Over the chancel, there is a painting of St Nicolas.

The vaults in St Anne's chapel also have wall paintings. On the eastern side, we see the four evangelists while on the western side there are three female saints: St Barbara, St Ursula, St Gertrude and St Catherine.

== Other churches with wall paintings ==
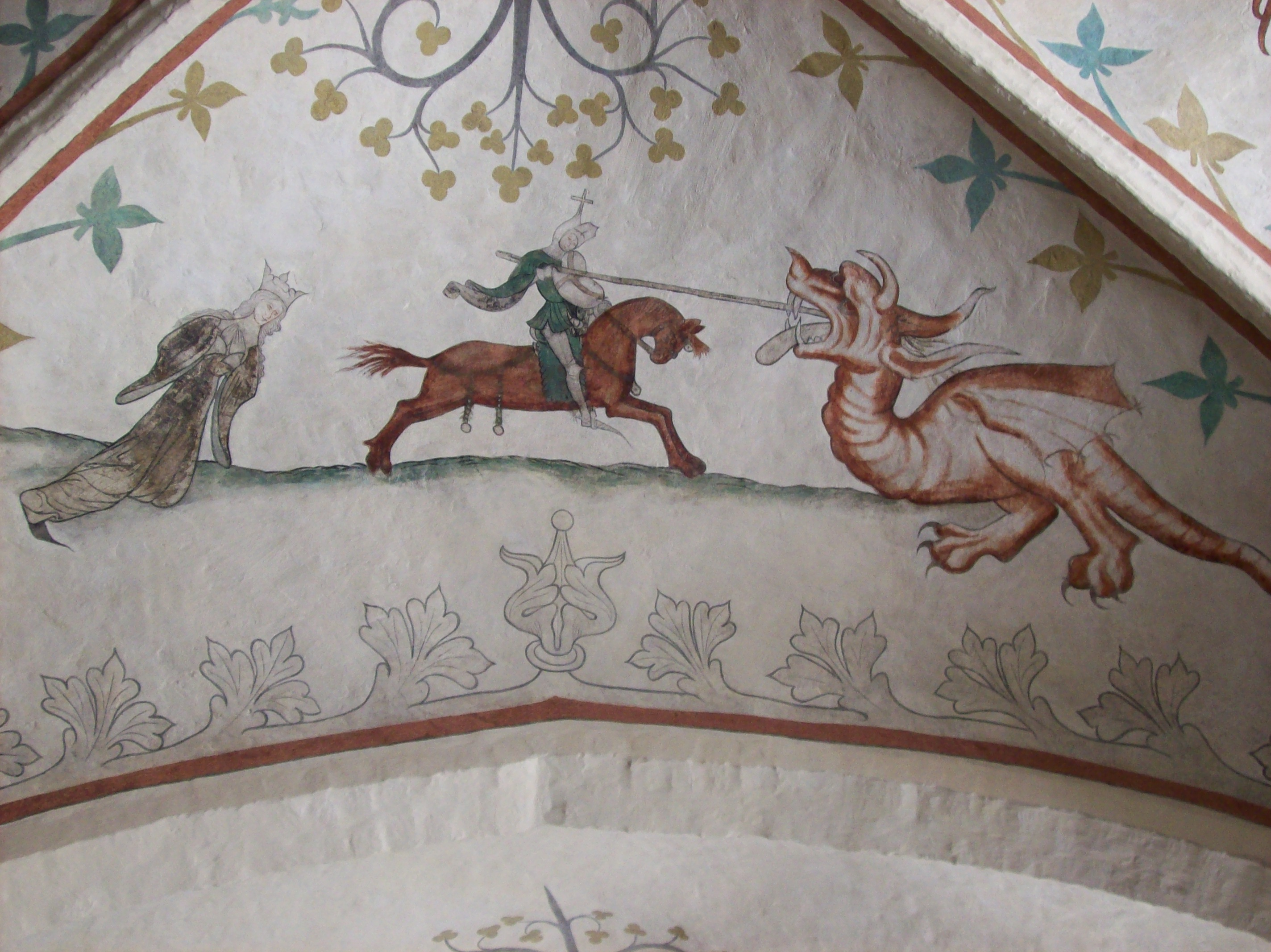
Højby: Dragon with St George

There are hundreds of Danish churches where wall paintings have been discovered, often in a very poor state. Indeed, in some cases they have been limewashed once again as it was not worthwhile restoring them. On the other hand, many have been uncovered and restored and can be seen today. Listed below are a number of churches, region by region, where wall paintings are of interest.

=== Zealand ===
- Undløse Church south of Holbæk is richly decorated with frescos by the so-called Union Master. The Resurrection scene was included in the Danish Cultural Canon in 2006 as a result of its high artistic quality.
- Højby Church, in Odsherred commune in northwestern Sealand is decorated with numerous frescos from around 1400 when the cross vaults were completed. The most impressive are of the Archangel Gabriel and of St George and the dragon.

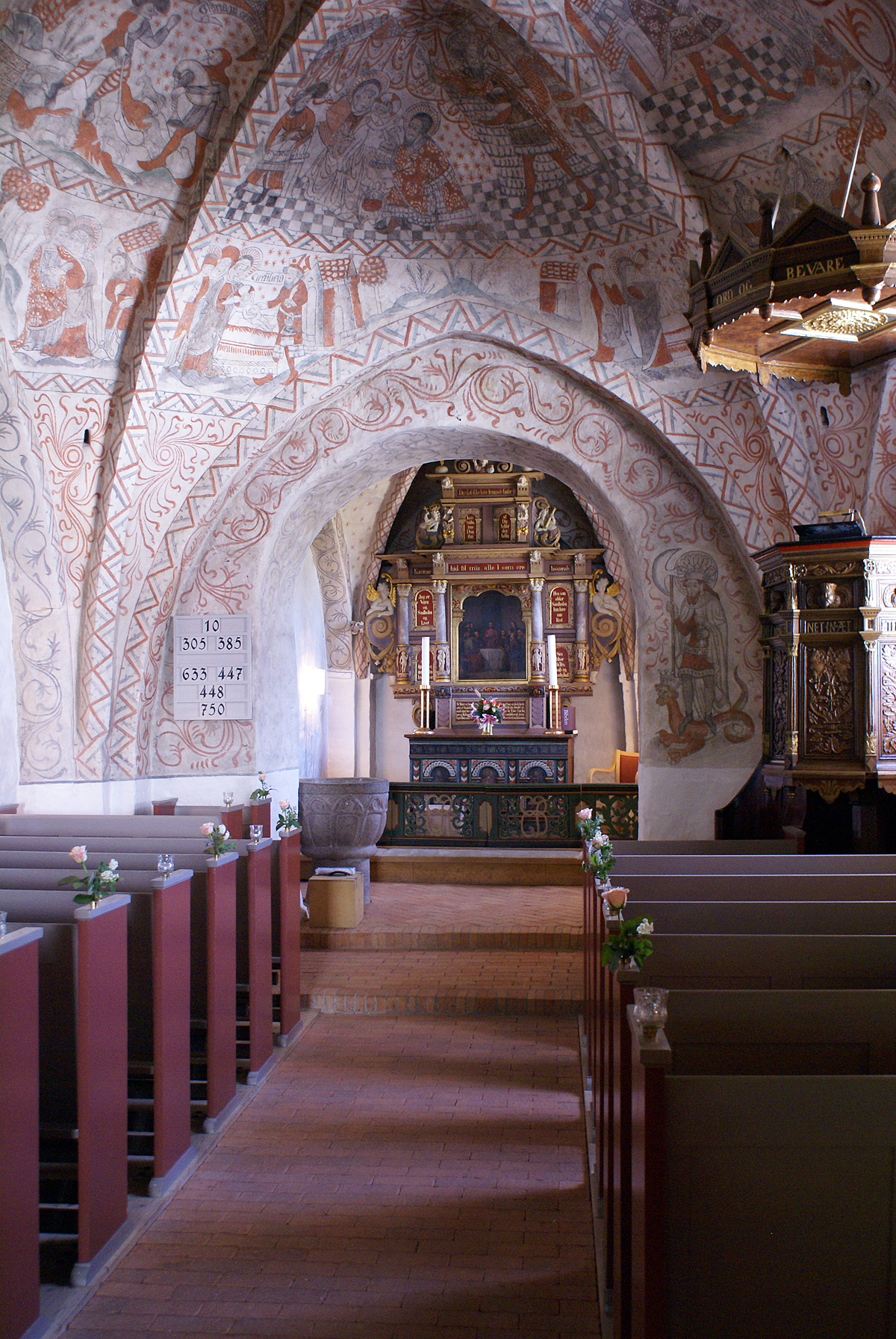
Murals in Tuse Church

- Tuse Church near Holbæk in northwestern Zealand is richly decorated with both Romanesque and late Gothic murals. It is however the latter which are regarded as possibly the finest works of the Isefjord artists who were most active from 1460 to 1480. The pictures depict stories from the Old and New Testaments but the life of Jesus is particularly interesting as it combines the biblical accounts with images of kings, devils and women brewing beer.
- Kirke Hyllinge Church in north-western Zealand between Isefjord and Roskilde Fjord has some of the oldest Romanesque murals in Denmark. They date back to about 1125 and are inspired by Byzantine art. Located on the chancel arch, they depict Mary flanked by two apostles.
- Reerslev Church lies in the village of Reerslev, adjacent to Høje-Taastrup near Roskilde. It has a number of interesting late-Gothic frescos depicting the life of Christ. They were painted by artists from the Isefjord school.
- Vigersted Church near Ringsted is also richly decorated with wall paintings in the vaults and around the doors. Dated at around 1450, they were rediscovered in the 1890s and later restored.
- Nødebo Church in the village of Nødebo on the shore of Lake Esrom, Northern Sealand

=== Lolland, Falster and Møn ===
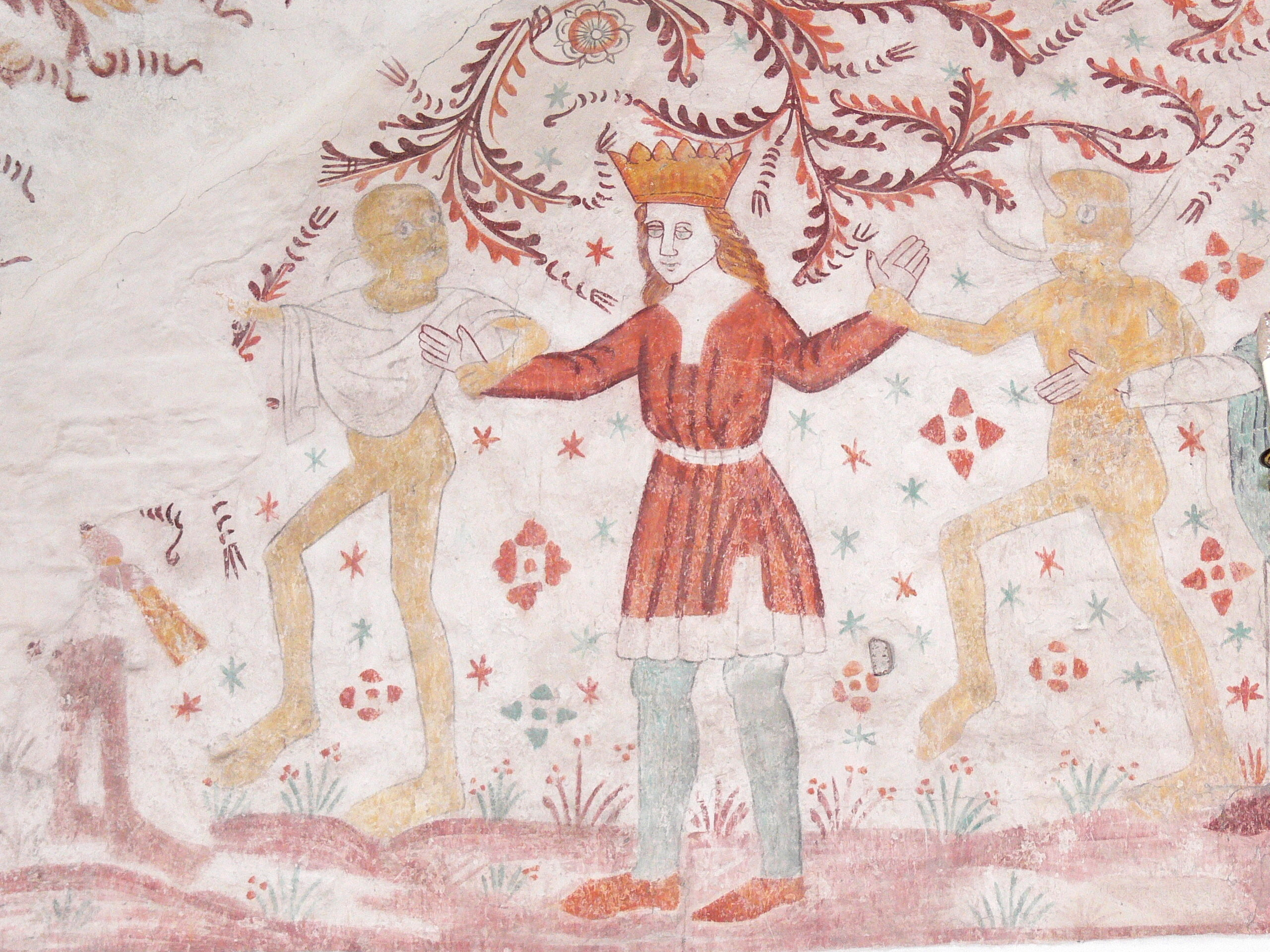
Nørre Alslev: Death Dance

In addition to Fanefjord, Keldby and Elmelunde churches on Møn which are widely recognised for their wall paintings by the Elmelunde Master, there are several other churches in the region which have frescos.

- Kippinge Church and the neighbouring Brarup Church in the northwest of Falster. Paintings from three periods.
- Nørre Alslev Church, northern Falster. Famous painting of the Dance of Death by the Elmelunde Master.
- Tågerup Church in the south of Lolland, richly decorated with murals by the Brarup workshop.
- Tingsted Church in central Falster. All the vaults in the nave and choir are richly decorated by the Elmelunde Master.
- Tirsted Church, near Rødby on Lolland. Of particular interest are the 46 Gothic paintings presenting scenes from the Old and New Testaments.
- Væggerløse Church on Falster has frescos (c. 1520) of the Supper at Emmaus.

=== Bornholm ===
The island of Bornholm is famous for its round churches. Two of them, Nylars and Østerlars, have huge central pillars with a band of frescos around the top depicting scenes from the Annunciation to the Last Judgment.

=== Læsø ===
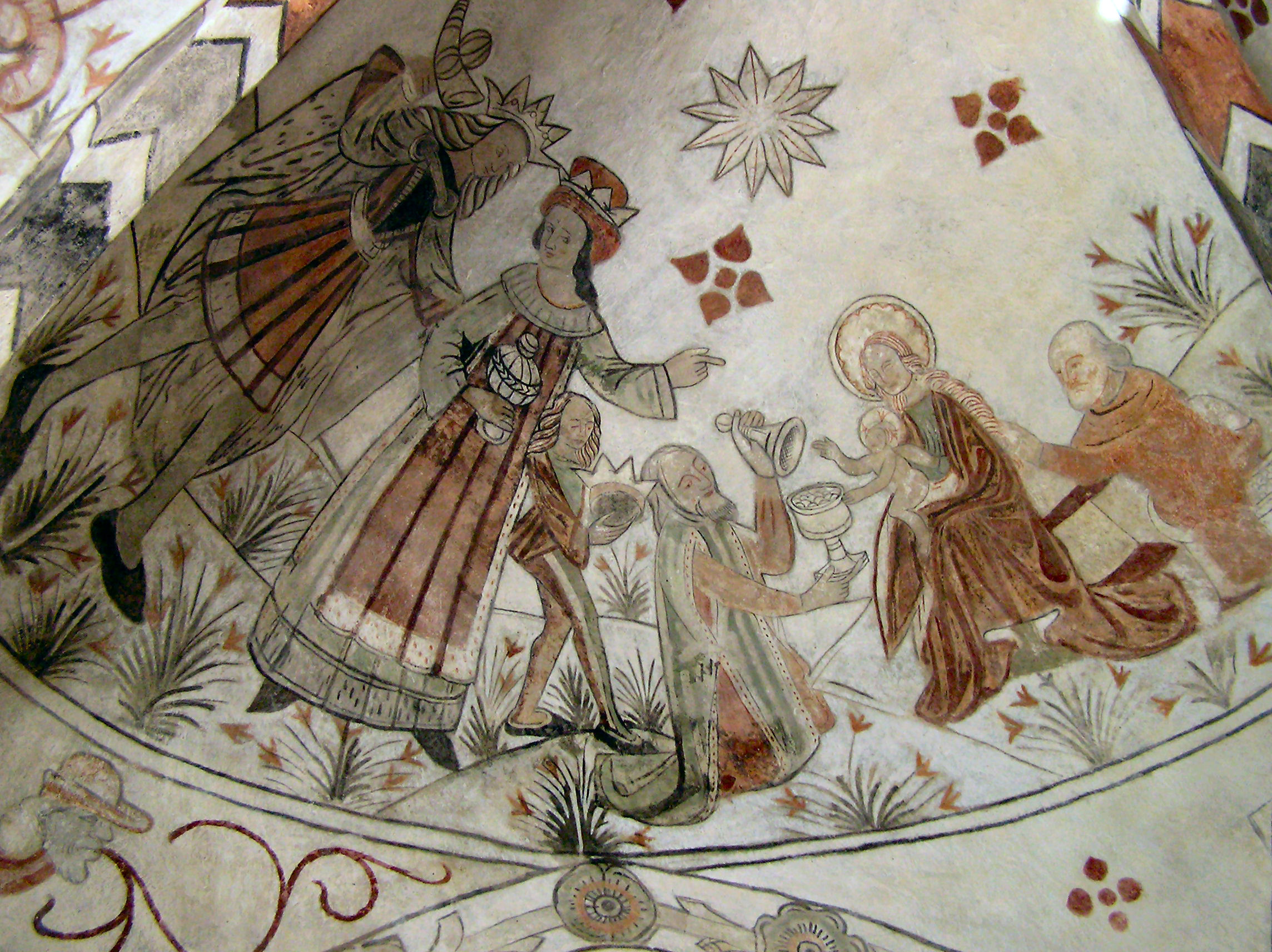
Vesterø: the Three Kings

The island of Læsø in the Kattegat lies some 19 km to the east of the Jutland peninsula.

- Vesterø Church on the island of Læsø is decorated with murals in the vaults of the chancel, dating back to about 1510. They depict the journey of the Three Kings and their arrival with presents before Jesus. They bear the names of Balthazar, Melchior and Kasper although these names do not appear in the Bible. The paintings were restored in 1982 by the National Museum.

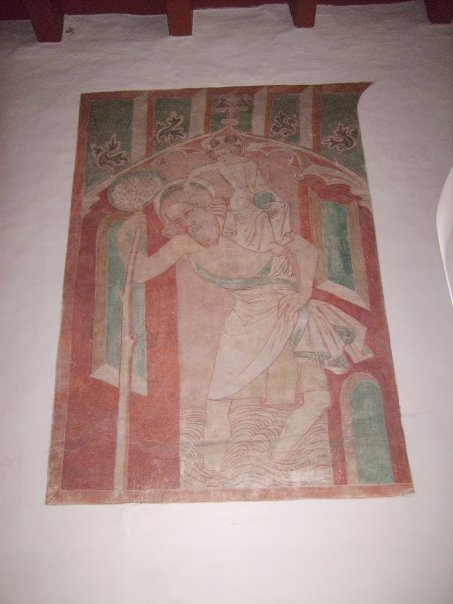
Hjørring: St Christopher

=== Funen ===
- Rynkeby Church in the northeast corner of Funen has a series of interesting paintings depicting angels playing a wide variety of musical instruments. They are exceptional in that they were painted after the Reformation.
- Søndersø Church in the north of Funen has a number of interesting wall paintings from the beginning of the 16th century, in particular those of the birth of Jesus and of the Virgin Mary.

=== Northern Jutland ===
- Sankt Hans Church in Hjørring, northern Jutland, has one interesting wall painting from about 1350 of St Christopher carrying the baby Jesus.

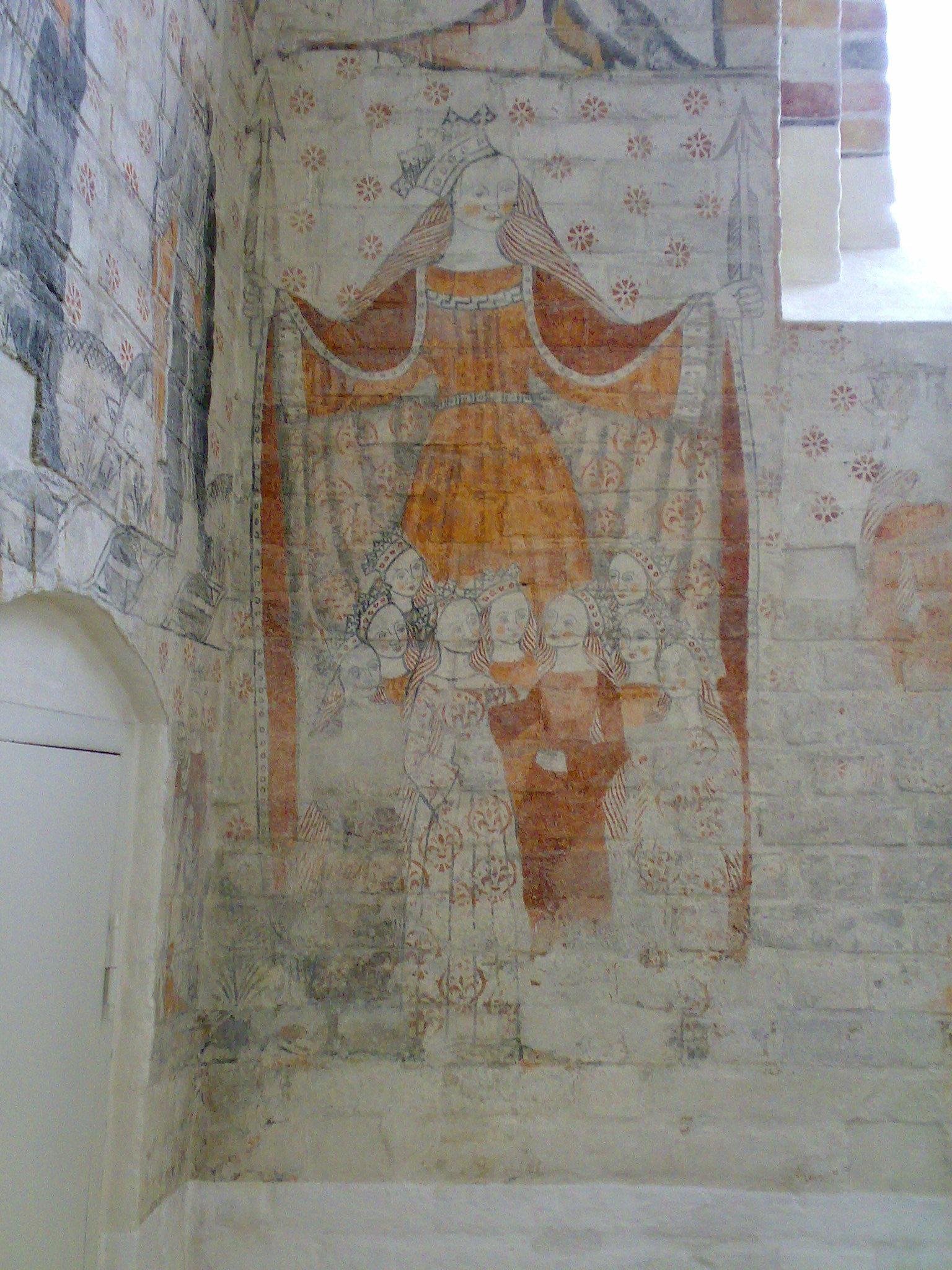
Nibe: St John

- Nibe Church, not far from Aalborg in the north of Jutland, was undergoing restoration work in the 1990s when a number of frescos were revealed. Like those in many other churches they tell the story of Saint George and the Dragon but there is also an interesting picture of John the Apostle with his attribute of the bowl of poison.
- Hyllested Church, 10 km north of Ebeltoft, has a rich collection of frescos painted by the Brarup Master (Brarupmesteren) from Falster between 1500 and 1520. One of them depicts a man shoeing a cat.

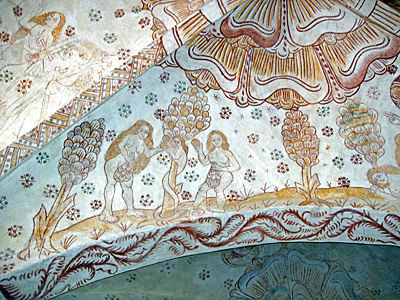
Skivholme: the Fall

- Grønbæk Kirke located between Aarhus and Viborg has some well preserved Romanesque frescos from about 1225. They present paintings of Jesus surrounded by the Virgin Mary, Peter, John and Paul.
- Skivholme Church, located some 20 km north-west of Århus, has a collection of frescos from 1500 to 1503 which decorate the vaults above the nave. The artist probably belonged to the so-called Århus School. The paintings were discovered and restored from 1896 to 1899.

=== Southern Jutland ===
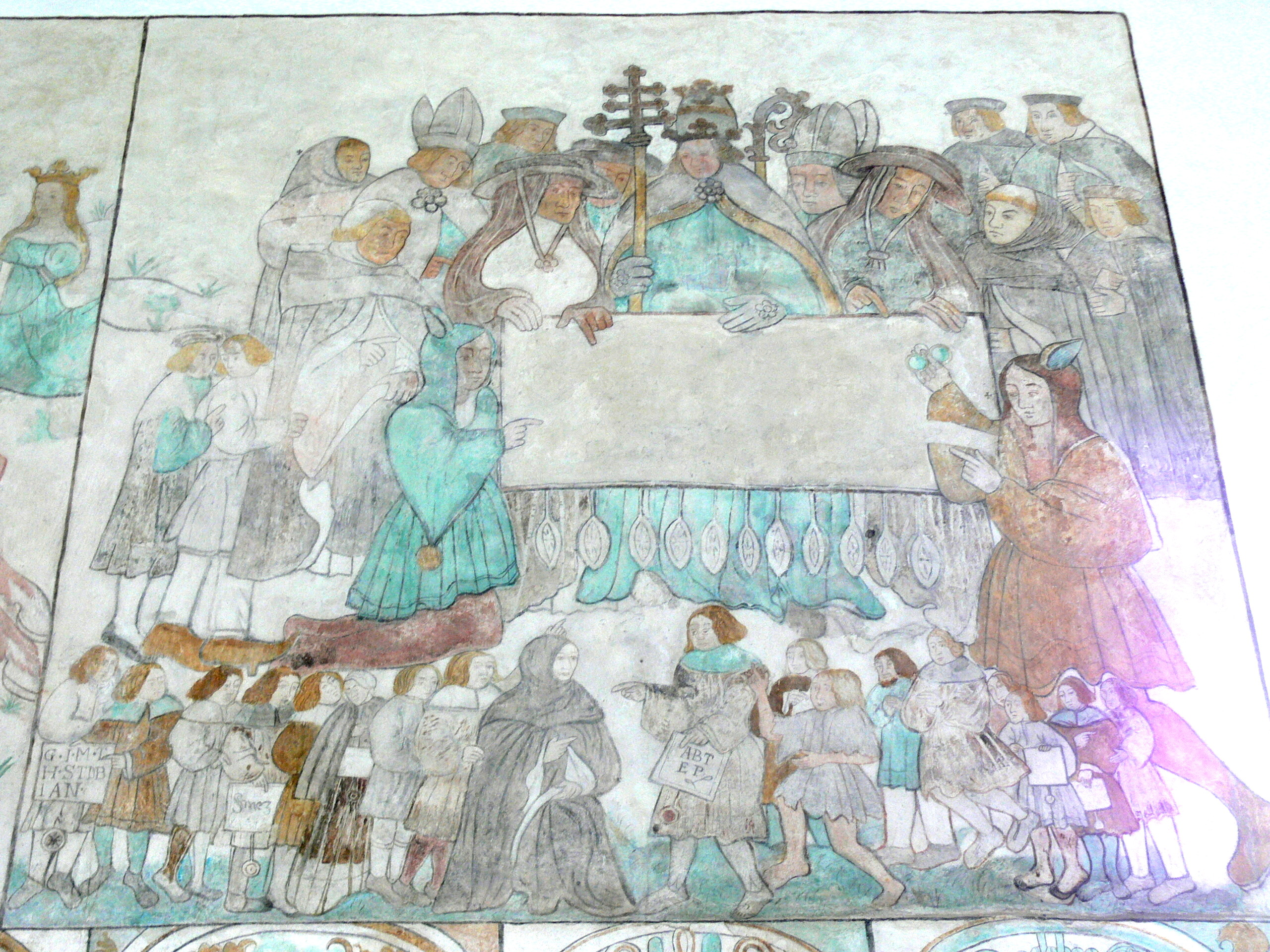
Brøns: Pope with an empty bull

- Brøns Church, located in Southern Jutland, south of Ribe, contains two Lutheran frescos, dating from c. 1530, which are probably Denmark's only examples of church frescos with distinctly Lutheran messages. One shows a heavenly castle under siege. An army led by pope and bishops try to gain access to it by force, while Christ – guarding its city gate – rejects them. Another image shows the pope and a number of bishops presenting a large papal bull, carrying a total of 11 ecclesiastic seals but no text. It is unknown whether this has always been the case, but the presence of two fools, one of them holding a pair of reading glasses, indicates that this is the intention; the Catholic Church is presented as without content. Below, a monk, standing a front of a group of men holding letters of indulgence is confronted by another group of people holding similar letters. This protest scene against the sale of indulgences is inspired by a contemporary woodcarving by Nuremberg artist, Hans Sebald Beham, who was staunchly anti-Catholic.

== Problems of restoration ==
While restoration techniques are constantly improving, the frescos are increasingly endangered by the heating systems installed in churches and by other activities such as concerts which now take place in the churches. Unless alternative solutions are found, the only secure way to preserve the paintings would be to cover them with limewash once again.

== See also ==
- Elmelunde Master
- Fanefjord Church
- List of church frescos in Sweden

== Bibliography ==
- C. R. Dodwell: The Pictorial arts of the West, 800-1200, 1993, Yale UP, ISBN 0-300-06493-4.
- Annett Scavenius: Elmelundemesteren i Fanefjord Kirke, Forlaget Vandkunsten, 2010, 121 pages. ISBN 978-87-7695-123-8.
