= Brarup Church =

Coordinates: 54°52′56″N 11°48′25″E

- Brarup Kirke
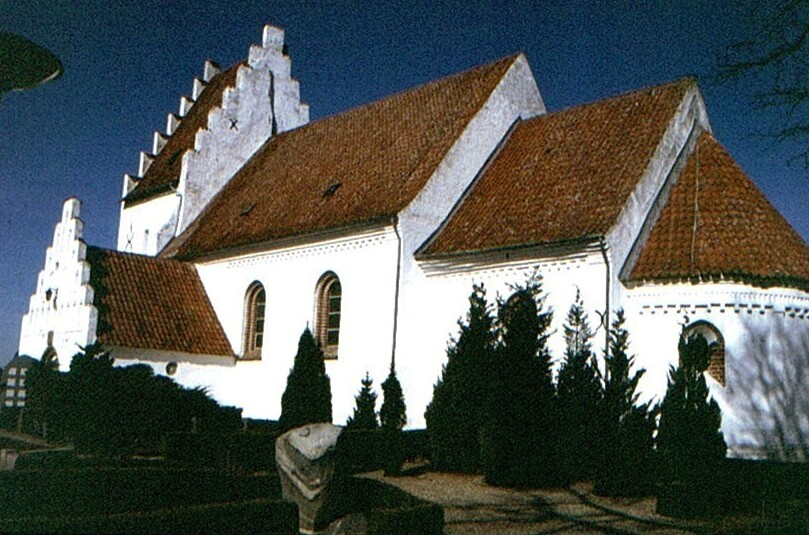
- Brarup Church
- Location: Brarup, Falster
- Country: Denmark
- Denomination: Church of Denmark

Architecture
- Style: Romanesque architecture

Administration
- Diocese: Diocese of Lolland–Falster
- Deanery: Falster Provsti
- Parish: Nordvestfalster Sogn

Brarup Church (Danish: Brarup Kirke) is located in the village of Brarup some 5 km (3.1 mi) southwest of Nørre Alslev on the Danish island of Falster. The Late Romanesque church has frescos from various periods including several by the Brarup Master and his workshop from the early 16th century.

== History ==
The church is an annex to Kippinge Church as it has been since before the Reformation. There is little information about ownership in the Middle Ages apart from the fact that the Crown had calling rights for the appointment of clergy. In 1585, the church owned factories and land strips on three farms. After the Reformation, the church was owned by the Crown until it was auctioned into private ownership in 1767 but by 1793 had been reacquired by the State. In 1868, it was bought by the citizens of the parish.

== Architecture ==
The apse, chancel and nave are built of brick in the Late Romanesque style on a double sloping plinth with pilaster strips at the corners and saw-toothed cornices at the top. The apse is divided into three sections with narrow pilaster strips. The bevelled window to the east has been opened up and the two others reconstructed in 1911 when the church was restored. On the south wall, a small, sharply pointed and slightly projecting priest's door can be seen. The south door is still in use but has been significantly transformed. The north door has been bricked up. The tower and porch were added in the Gothic period.

== Interior ==
The apse has retained its half-domed vault. The cross vaults in the chancel and the nave's flat ceiling are original. Salt decay is noted on a vault's medieval bricks. The altarpiece, a carved triptych from c. 1450 similar to the one in Vålse Church, depicts the Crucifixion in the centre flanked by the Apostles. The paintings on the back of the lateral panels are of the Virgin Mary, John the Evangelist, St Catherine and John the Baptist.

The crucifix on the west wall, 268 cm (106 in) in height, dates from the beginning of the 14th century. The pulpit (1635) is the work of Jørgen Ringnis, carved in the Auricular style. Similar to that in Nørre Alslev Church, it contains carved figures of Moses, Christ the Savior and John the Baptist. The figures of the four Evangelists, originally in the panels of the pulpit, are now in the apse. Originally in the chancel arch, it was moved to the southeast corner of the church, probably in 1852.

== Frescos ==
The church has frescoes from three periods, those in the apse are from c. 1275, the chancel arch decorations are from c. 1300, attributed to the Kippinge workshop, and those on the walls of the chancel and nave are from 1500–1520, attributed to the Brarup workshop. The dome of the apse contains an interesting representation of the Coronation of the Virgin from c. 1275, the oldest in Denmark, probably influenced by monks of the mendicant orders of the period. To the north, there are three female saints, St Catherine, St Margaret and a nun saint. To the south, a bishop without a halo and three kings can be seen, at least two with a halo. The kneeling woman is undoubtedly one of the founders of the church although there is no portrait of the male counterpart.

The frescos on the chancel arch with seraphim and angels bearing censers are attributed to the Kippinge workshop. There are also traces of the story of the Creation including Adam and Eve.

The murals on the chancel walls from 1500 to 1520 are the work of the Brarup Master. St Erasmus and St Lawrence can be seen on the north wall, the Resurrection of Jesus on the south. The chancel arch displays Christ in Majesty flanked by Mary, John the Baptist and the Apostles. The frescos on the north wall present the childhood of Jesus and scenes from the Passion. The alleged relationship to the Elmelund workshop is difficult to see if the Annunciation is compared to its depiction in Fanefjord or Elmelunde. The eyes and nose of Pilate's face are clearly different from those in Elmelunde. The south wall presents St Christopher with the baby Jesus and George and the Dragon. Beside the west door there are four murals of the story of Adam and Eve.

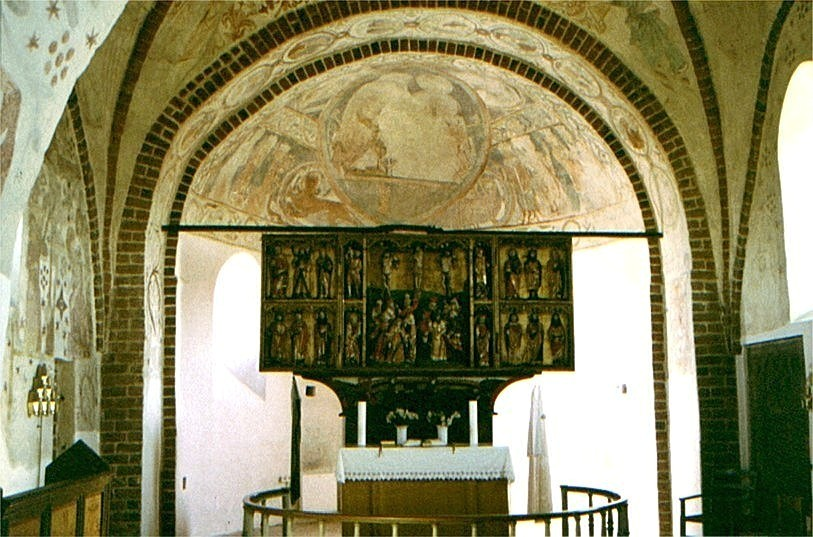
Apse and altarpiece

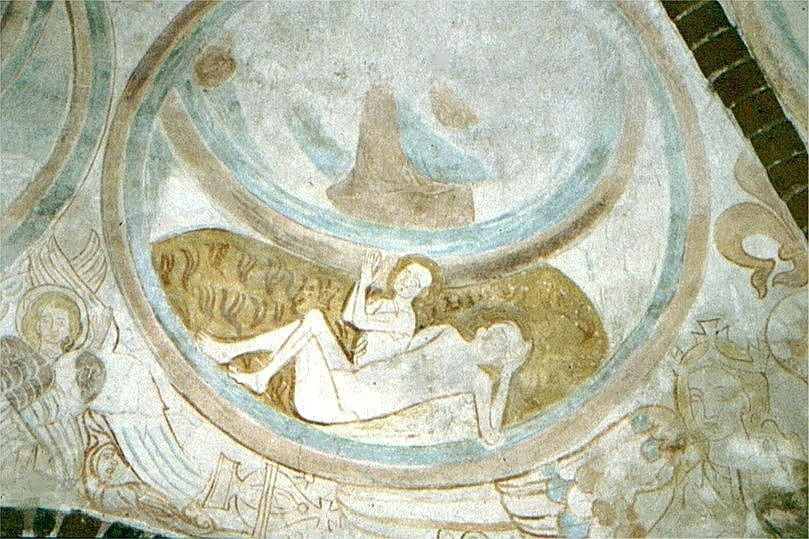
Eva's birth, chancel vault

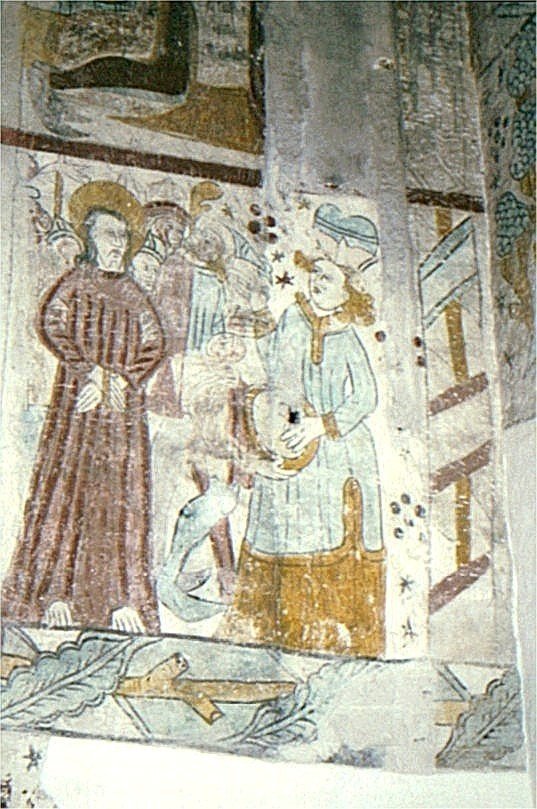
Nave wall, Christ with Pilate

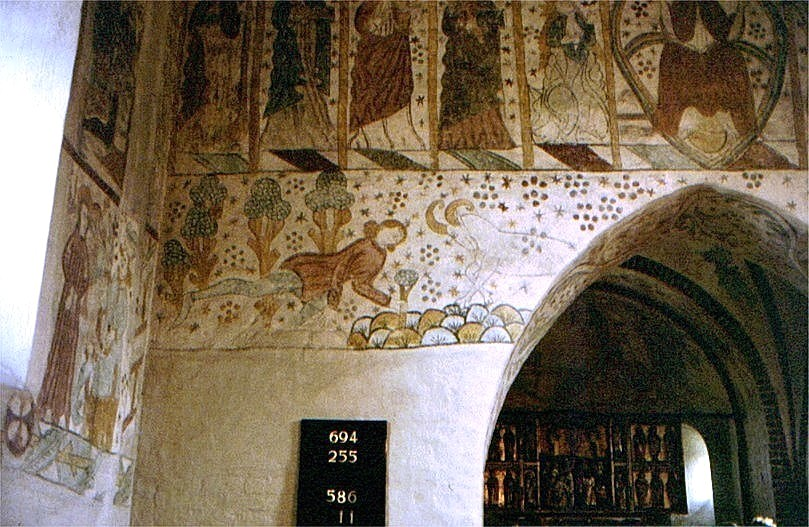
Triumphal arch, man and goat

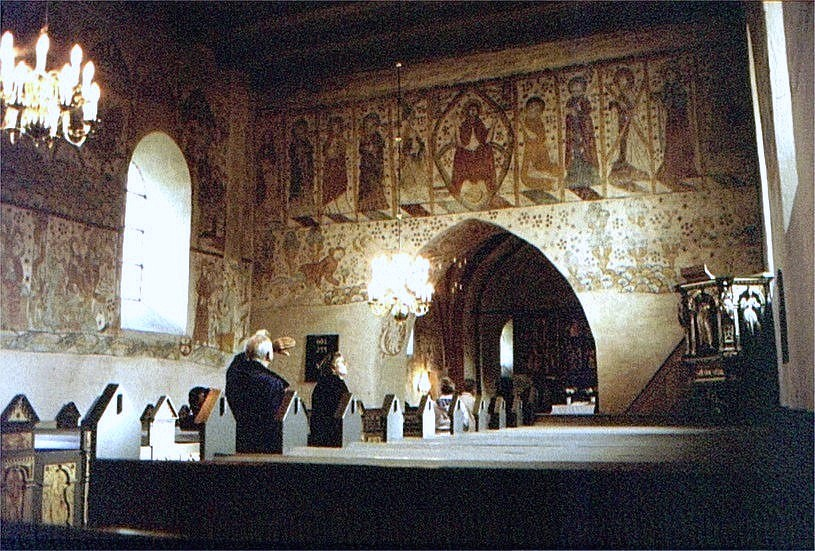
The nave with Christ in Majesty
