= Elmelunde Church =

Coordinates: 54°59′42″N 12°24′03″E

- Elmelunde Kirke
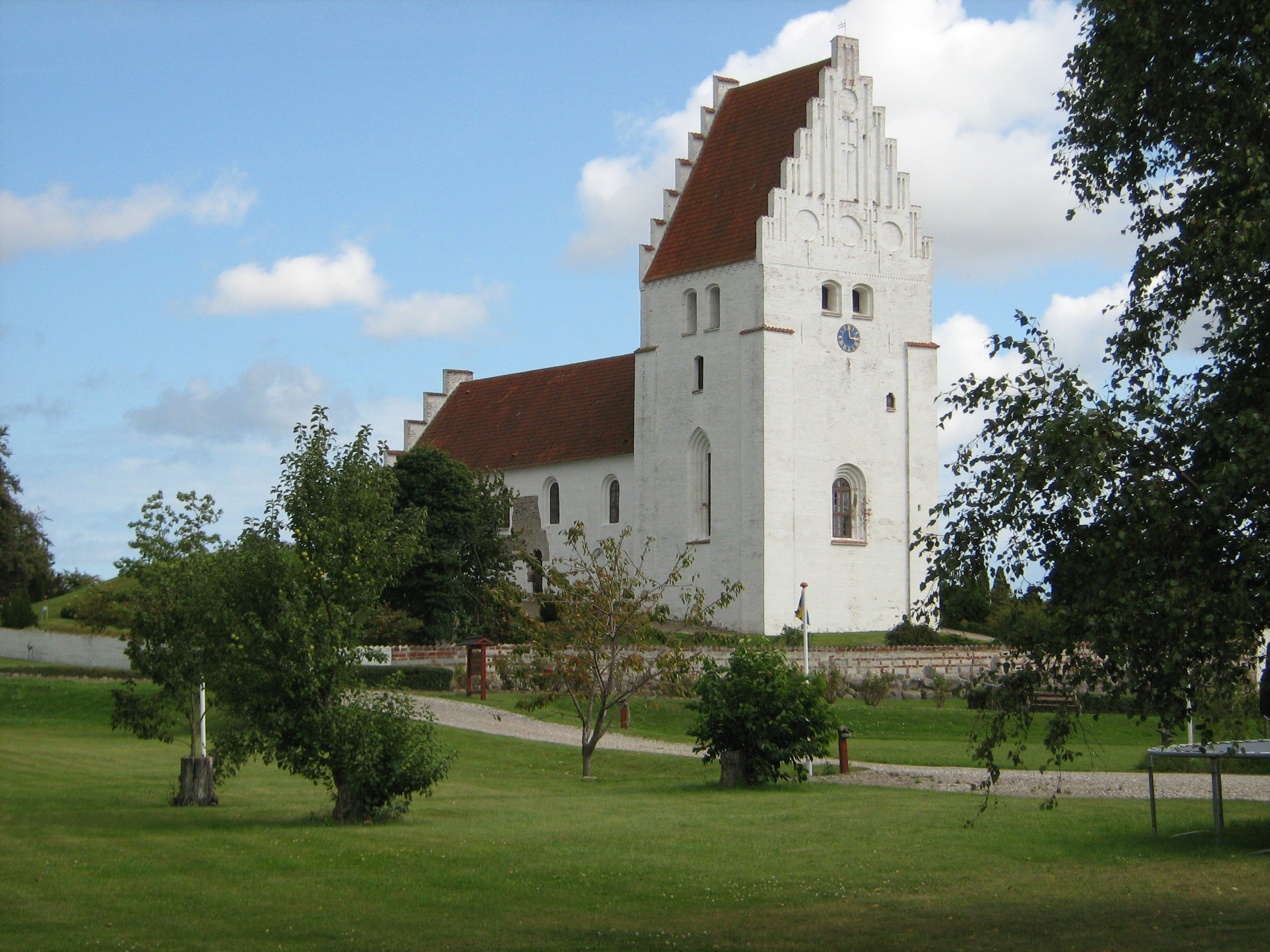
- Elmelunde Church
- Location: Elmelunde, Møn
- Country: Denmark
- Denomination: Church of Denmark

Architecture
- Years built: 1085

Administration
- Diocese: Diocese of Roskilde
- Deanery: Stege-Vordingborg Provsti
- Parish: Elmelunde Sogn

Elmelunde Church, famous for its frescos, is located in the village of Elmelunde, Møn, in southeastern Denmark. It stands high above the surroundings just south of the main road from Stege to the white cliffs of Møn. The impressive whitewashed building can be seen from miles around and has been used as a landmark by sailors in the Baltic Sea.

== History ==
Elmelunde is the oldest church on the island of Møn, apparently constructed on a site where a wooden church once stood. The flat mound, to the north of the church, is even older. It is believed to be a heathen burial ground from the Bronze Age.

The present church dates back to 1085 when parts of the present choir and nave were built in the Romanesque style. Only the triumphal arch and the sidewalls remain from this period.

The earliest additions were carried out around the year 1200 when the church was extended towards the west. Work on the tower began around 1300 but was not completed until 1500. The wooden ceiling was replaced by Gothic crossvaulting in 1462.

== Frescos ==
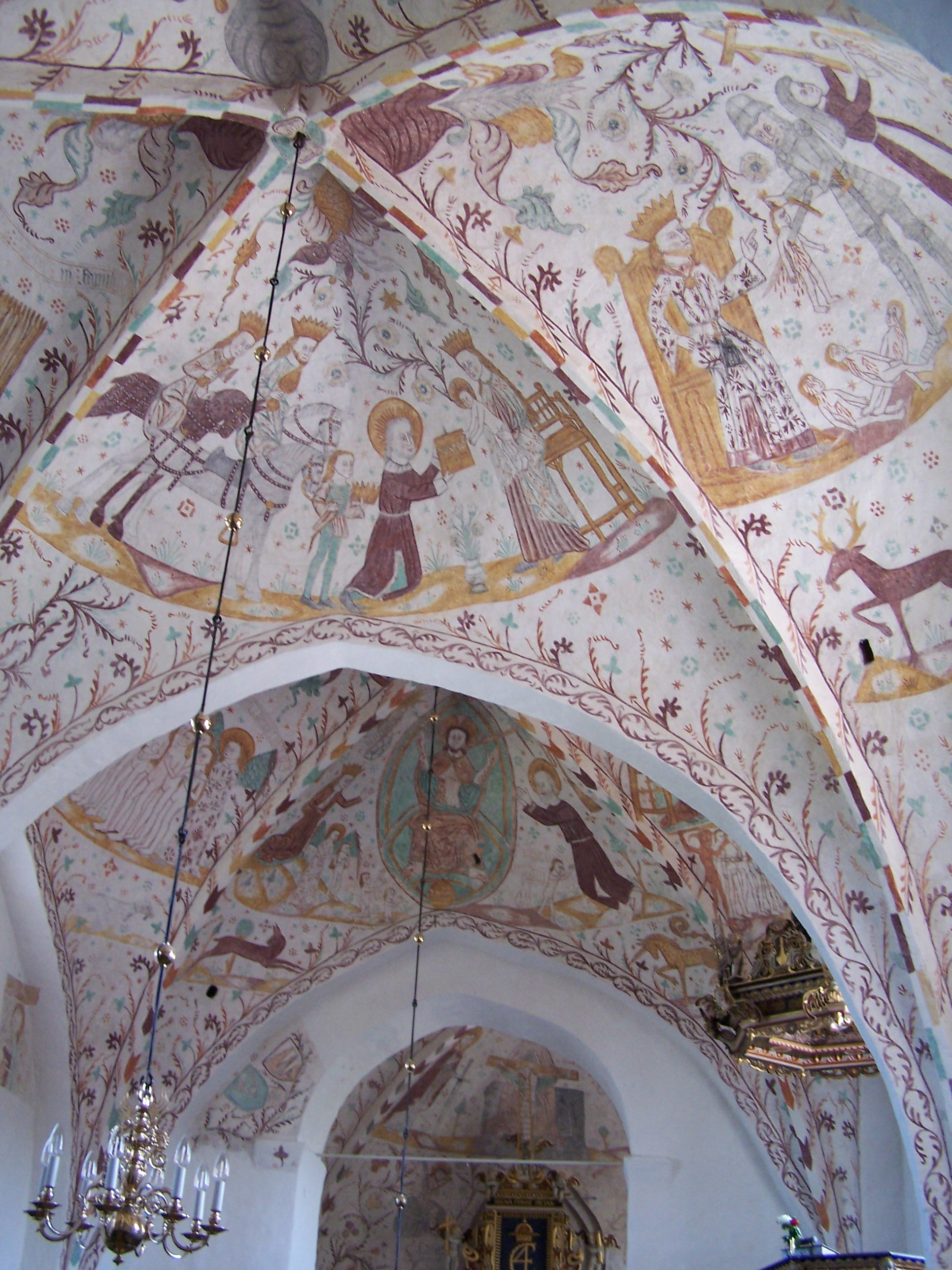
Frescoes inside Elmelunde Church

The church's many well-preserved frescos or kalkmalerier cover the Gothic vaulting of the nave and choir. Like the murals in two of Møn's other churches, Keldby and Fanefjord, they were painted in the Gothic style by the so-called Elmelunde Master, probably towards the end of the 15th century. In the so-called Biblia pauperum style, they present many of the most popular stories from the Old and New Testaments.

The paintings were hidden for centuries as, following the reformation, they were covered with layer after layer of limewash. In 1969, the National Museum of Denmark undertook major restoration work on the wall paintings. The vaults were cleaned, earlier restoration work was corrected and new frescos were revealed. The paintings in the nave and choir were discovered in 1885 and initially restored in 1895. During the most recent restoration work, it was found that the church had earlier been decorated with Romanesque frescos, traces of which could be seen on the walls of the nave and on the triumphal arch. However, until now, it has not been possible to restore them.

The most comprehensive wallpainting work was in fact carried out by the Elmelunde Master presenting a variety of scenes from the story of the Creation and the New Testament but also with illustrations of everyday activities such as ploughing and hunting. Between the paintings, margins with frills depicting flowers, plants and other ornaments can be seen. The figures all have sleepy faces, a characteristic of the Elmelund Master. Colours include black, ochre, caput mortuum, and cinnabar which has now faded to verdigris.

== Altar and pulpit ==
The richly carved altar, 1646, was a gift from King Christian IV´s daughter, Leonora Christina, and her husband Corfitz Ulfeldt. The central frame depicts the institution of the Holy Communion. The sides present the evangelists Mark and John.

The pulpit, also a present from the Ulfeldts, is borne by the apostle Peter and is from the year 1649. Large representations of the four evangelists fill the larger frames while the corner frames house their symbols.

== Graveyard ==
Notable people who are buried in the graveyard include:

- Christian Danneskiold-Samsø, landowner and administrative leader of the Royal Danish Theatre
- Nicoline Margrethe Winther (1891-1971), politician
- Henrik Haubroe (1915-2014), businessman

== Gallery ==
Here is a selection of frescos in Elmelunde Church painted by the Elmelunde Master.

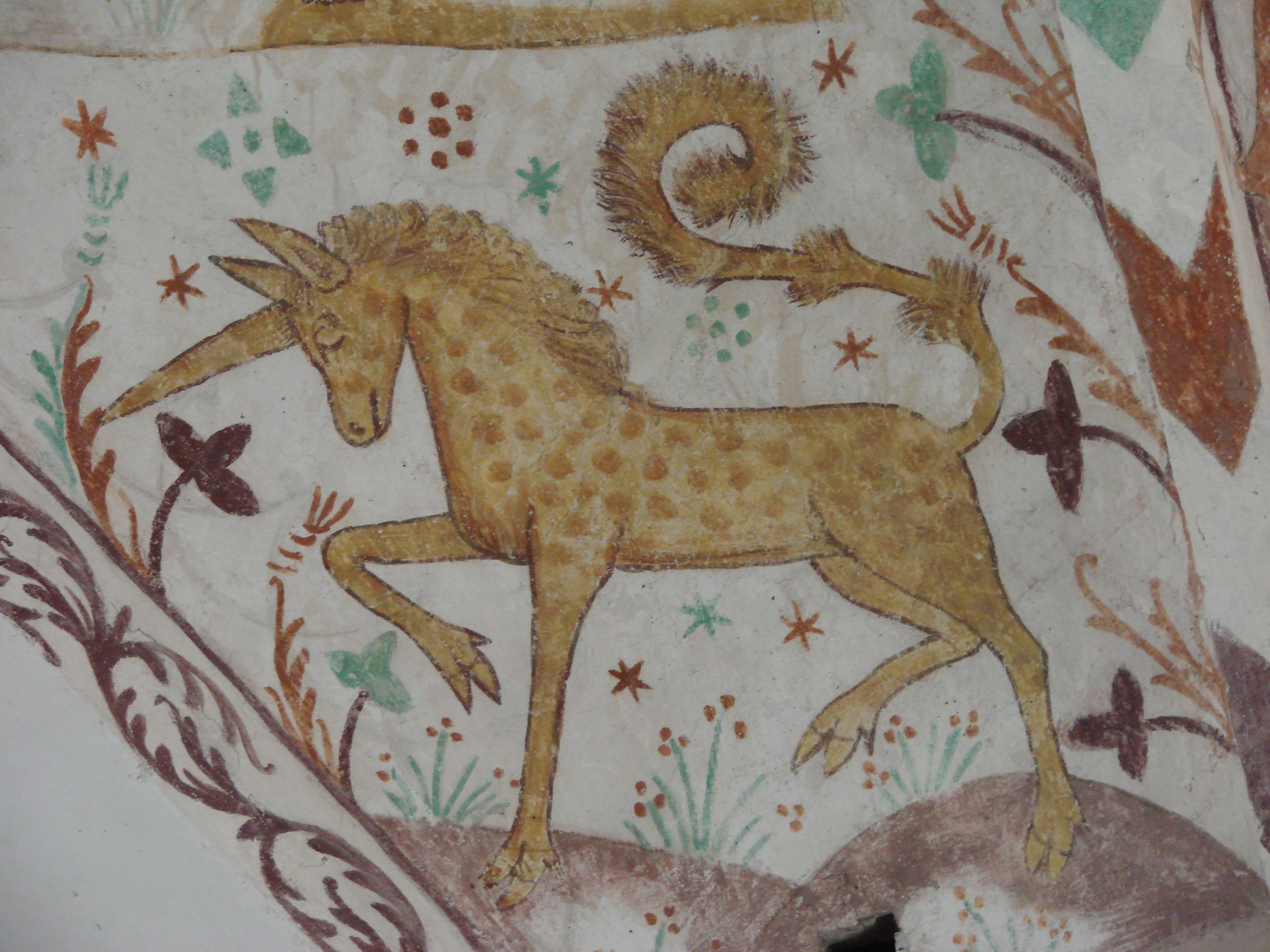
Unicorn

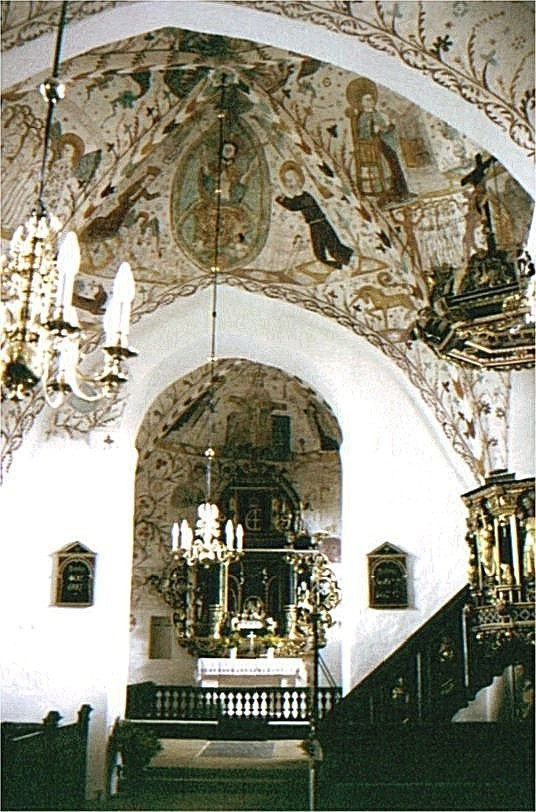

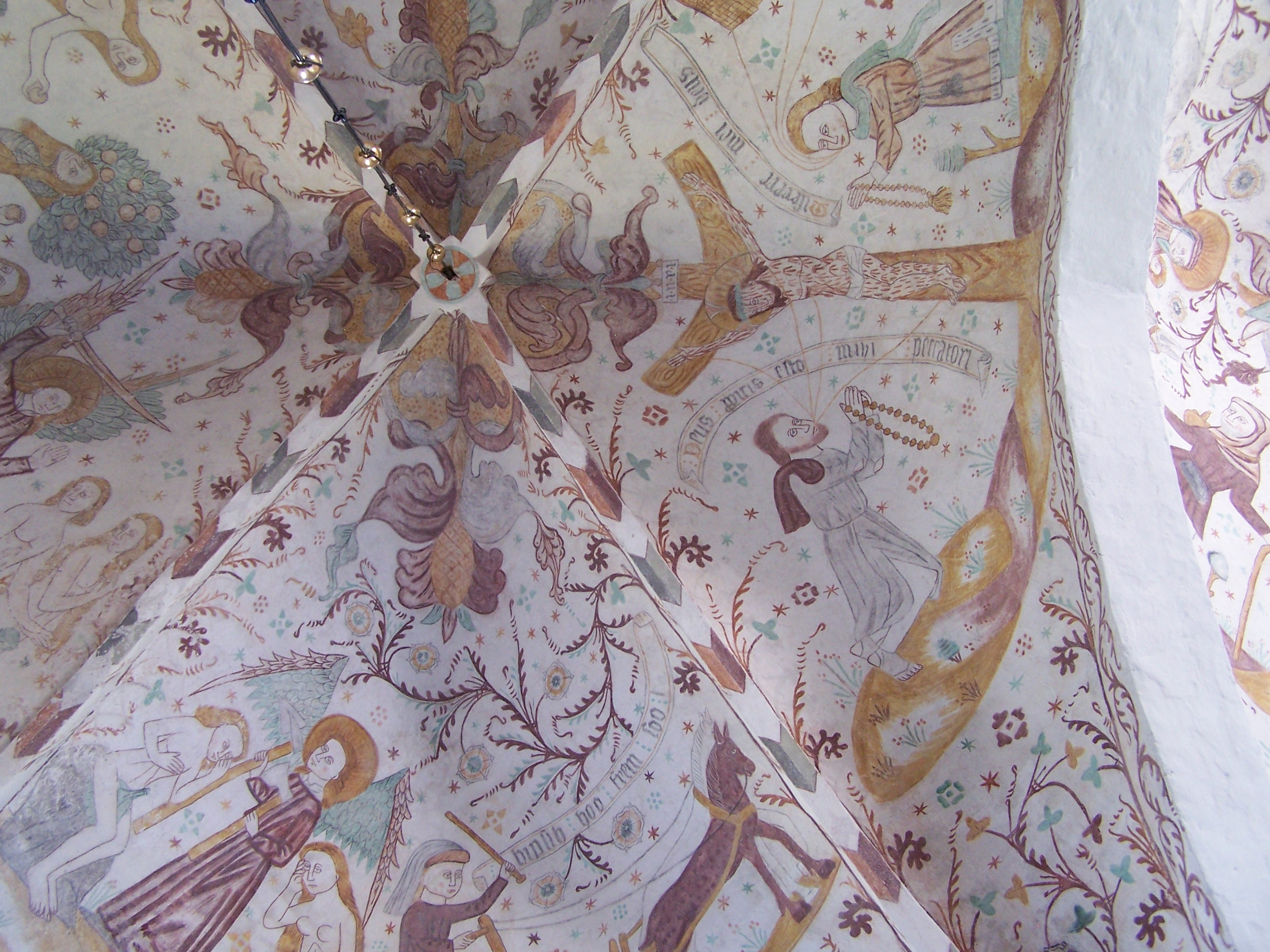

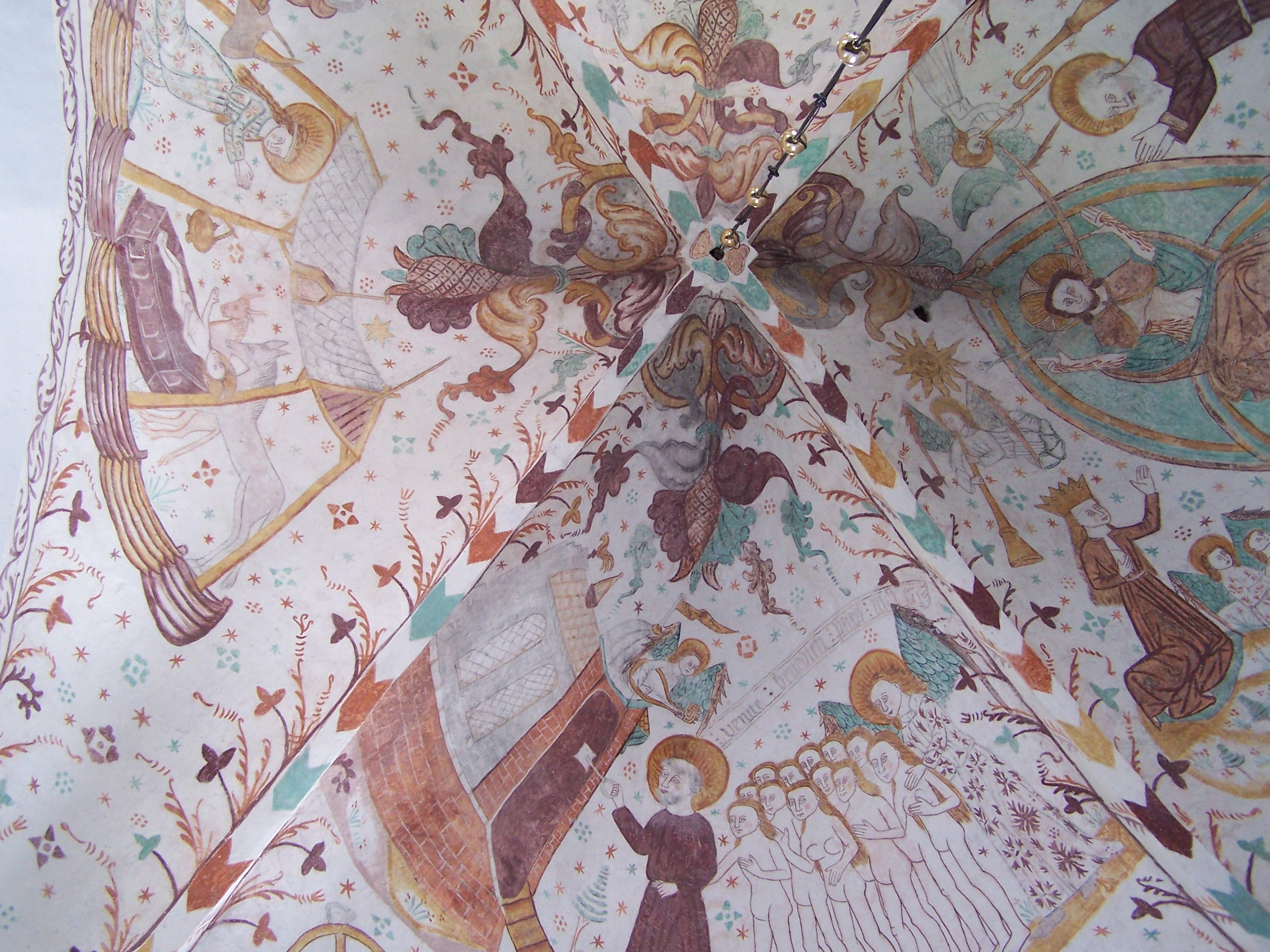

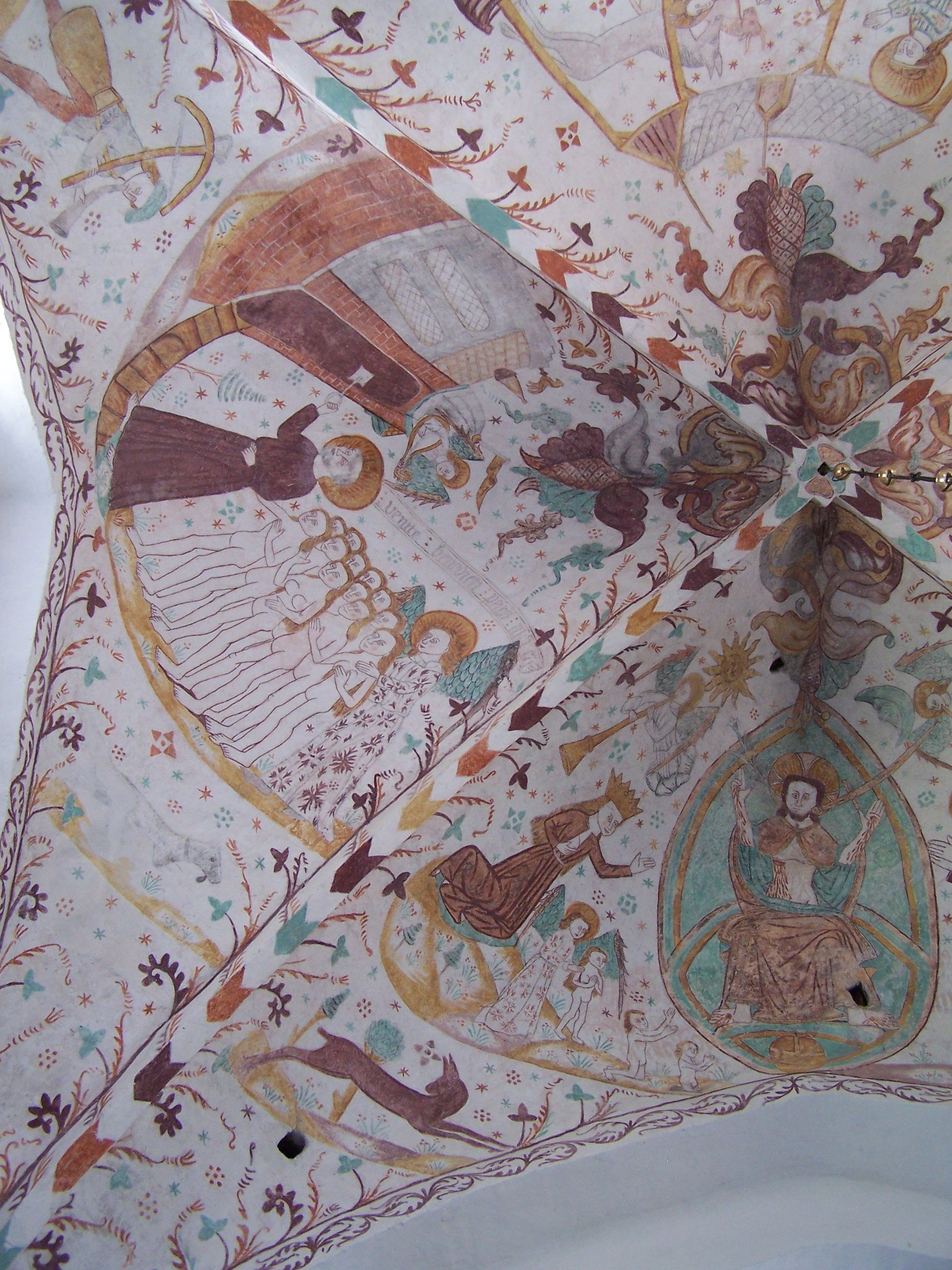

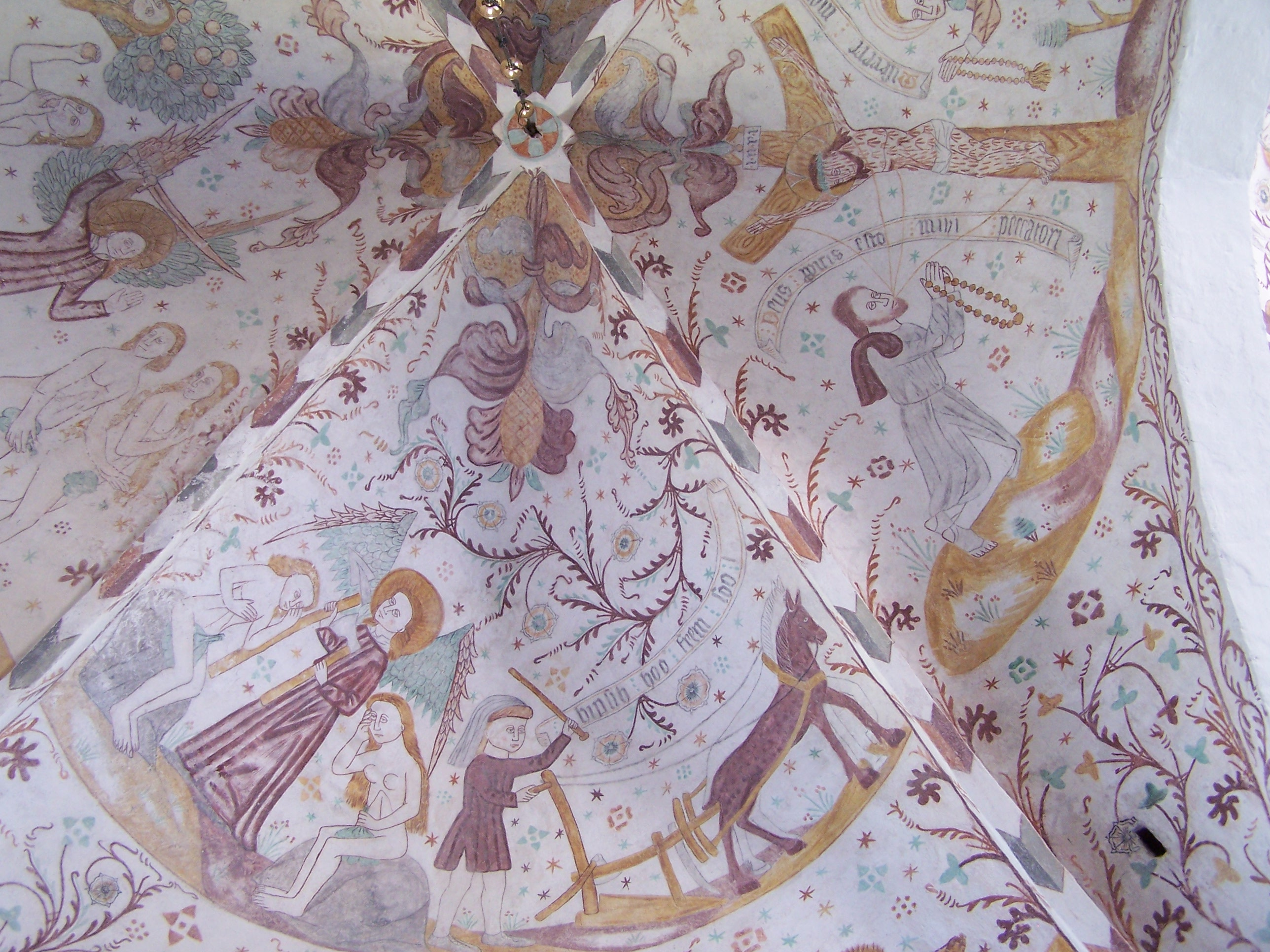

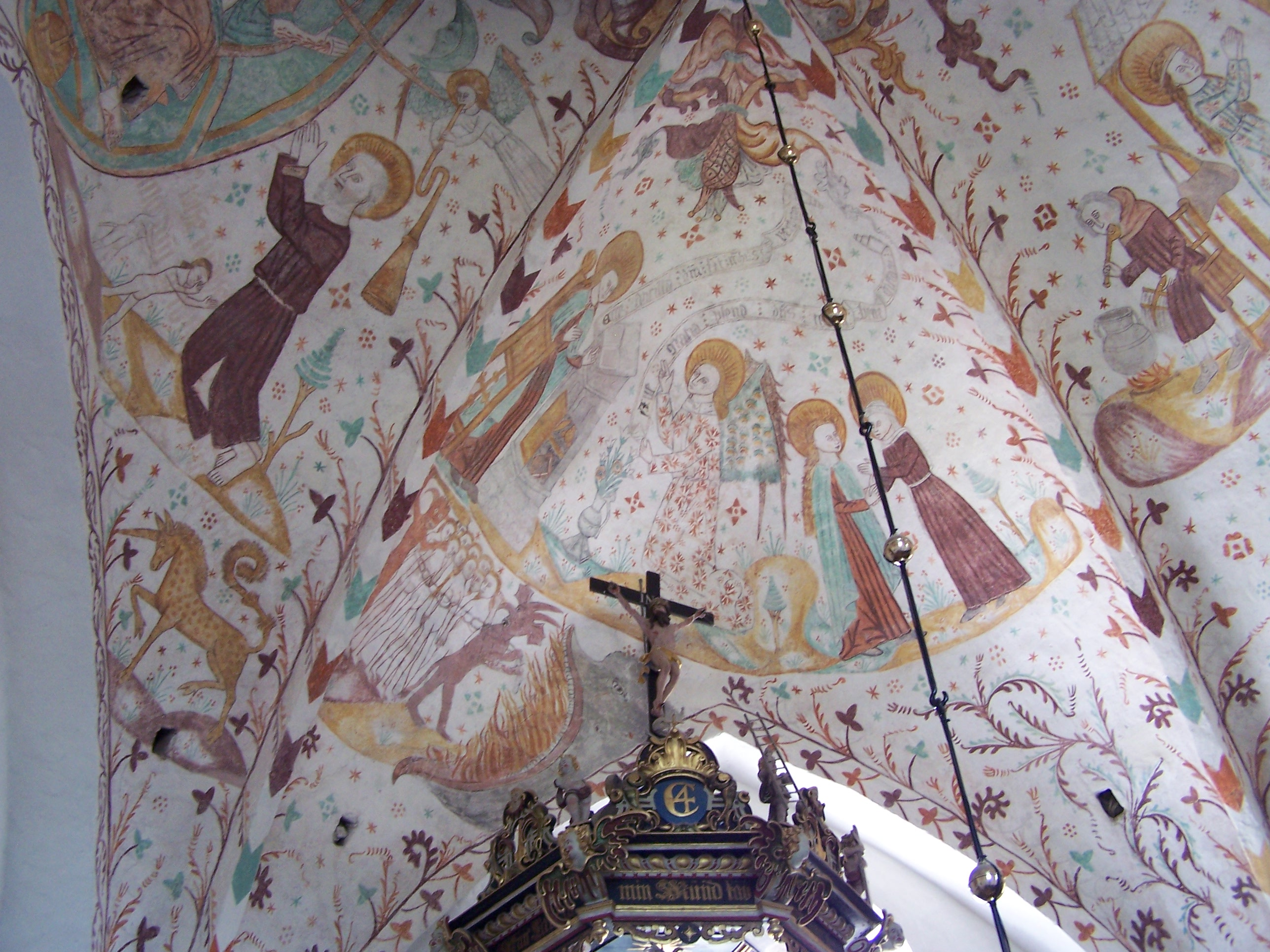

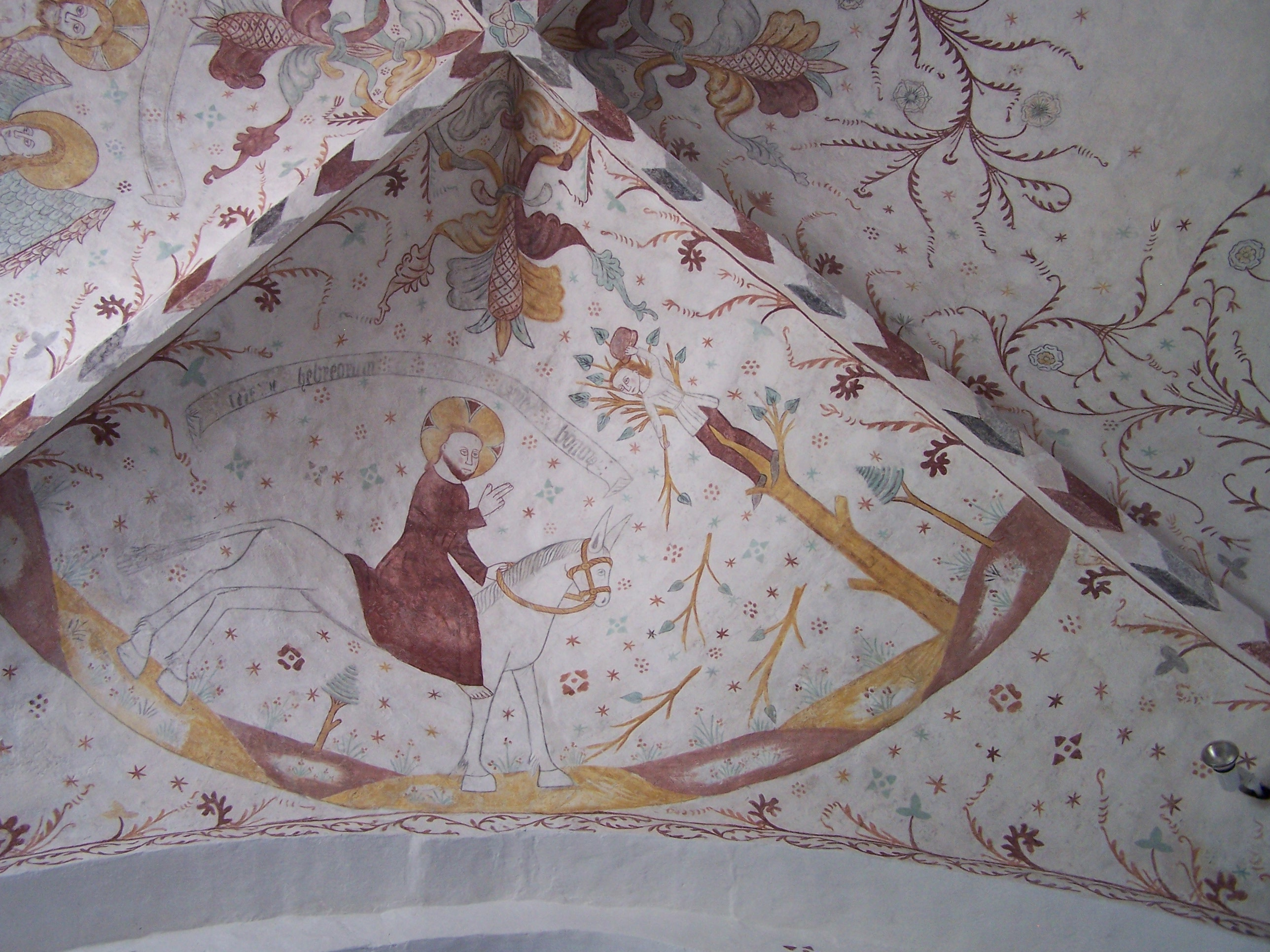

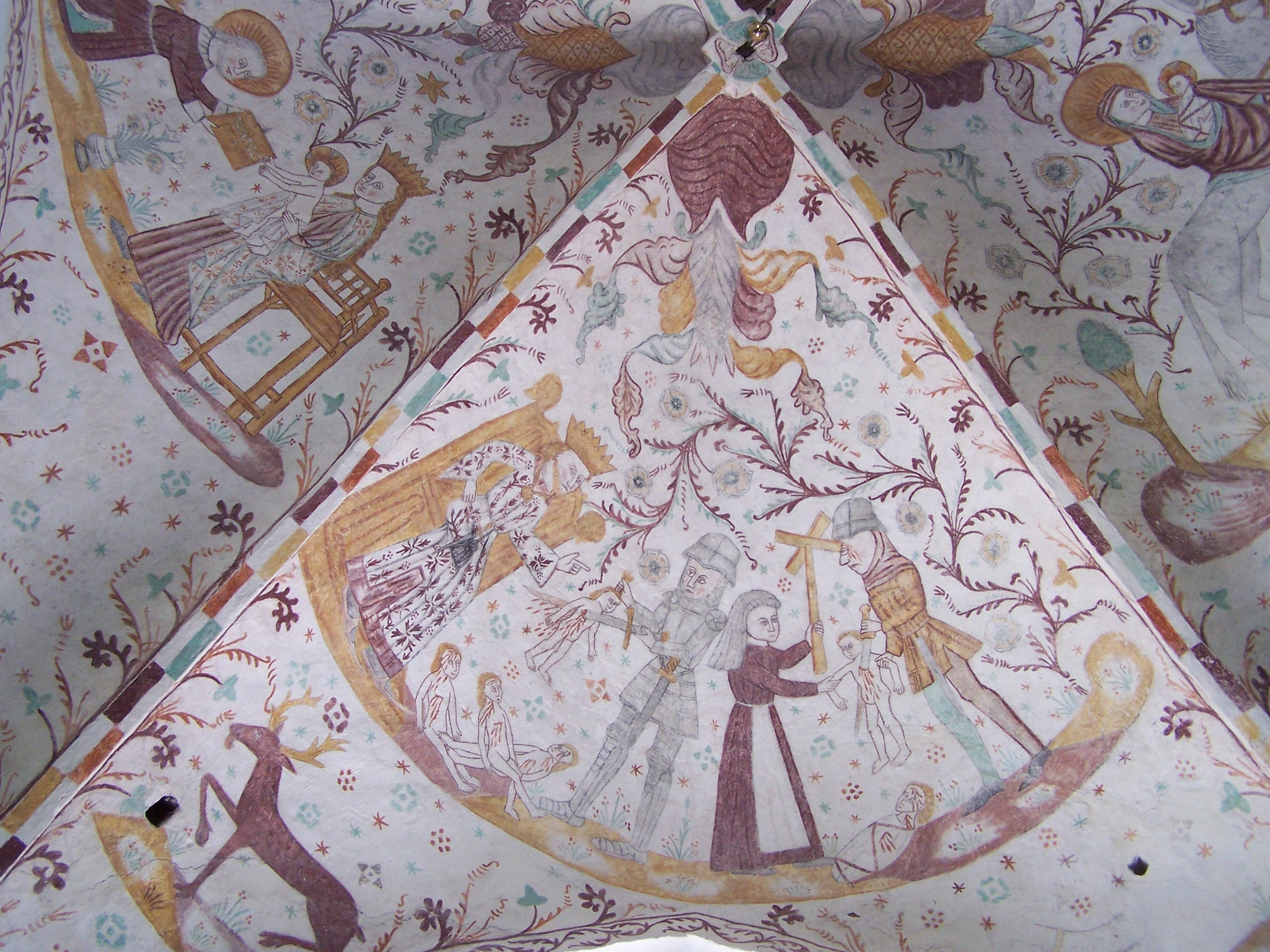

== See also ==
- Church frescos in Denmark
- Fanefjord Church
- Elmelunde Master
