= Keldby Church =

Coordinates: 54°59′27.7″N 12°20′38.08″E

- Keldby Kirke
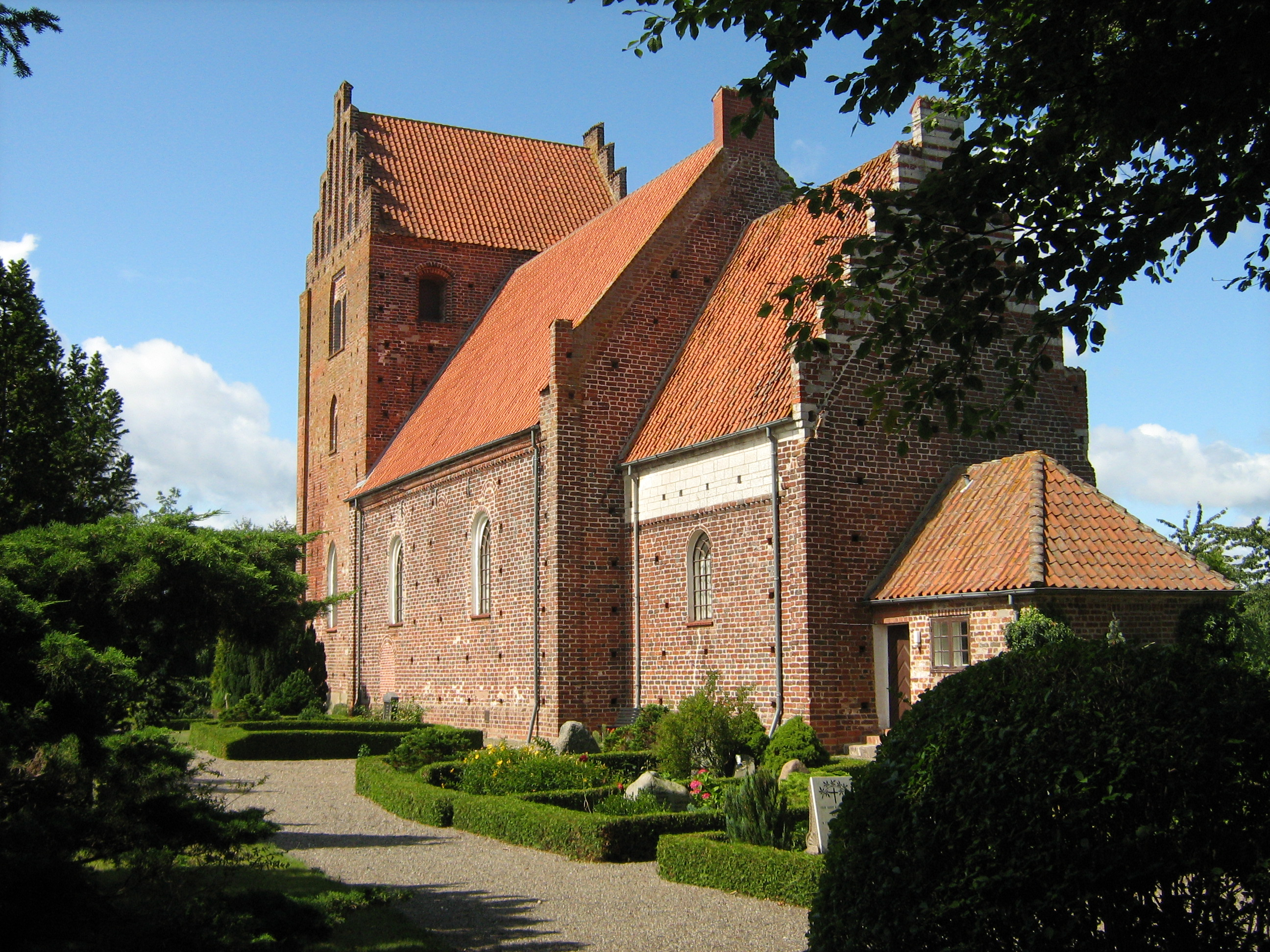
- Keldby Church
- Location: Keldby, Møn
- Country: Denmark
- Website: www.keldbyelmelundekirke.dk/

Architecture
- Years built: 13th century

Administration
- Diocese: Diocese of Roskilde
- Deanery: Stege-Vordingborg Provsti
- Parish: Keldby Sogn

Keldby Church, famous for its frescoes, is located on the main road to Møns Klint in the village of Keldby, 4 km east of Stege on the Danish island of Møn.

The imposing red brick church is one of the three Møn churches decorated with frescos by the Elmelunde Master, probably towards the end of the 15th century. In the Biblia pauperum style, they present many of the most popular stories from the Old and New Testaments. There are also a number of earlier frescoes in the church dating back to about 1275.

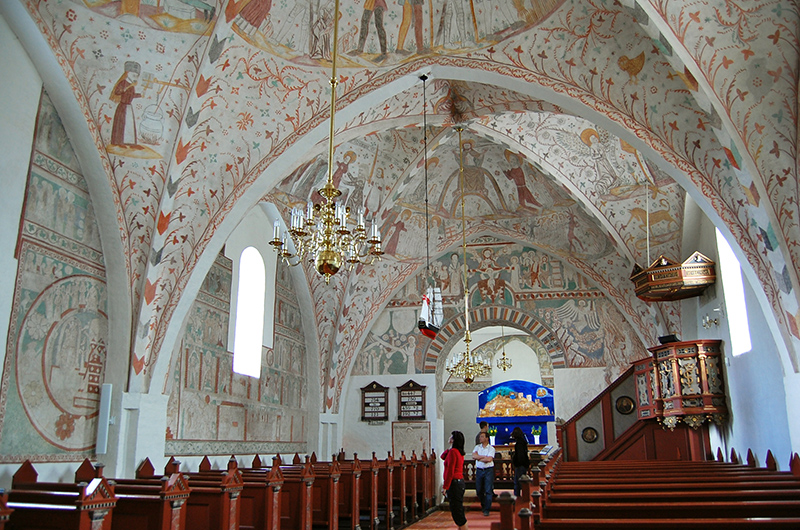
Frescoes inside Keldby Church

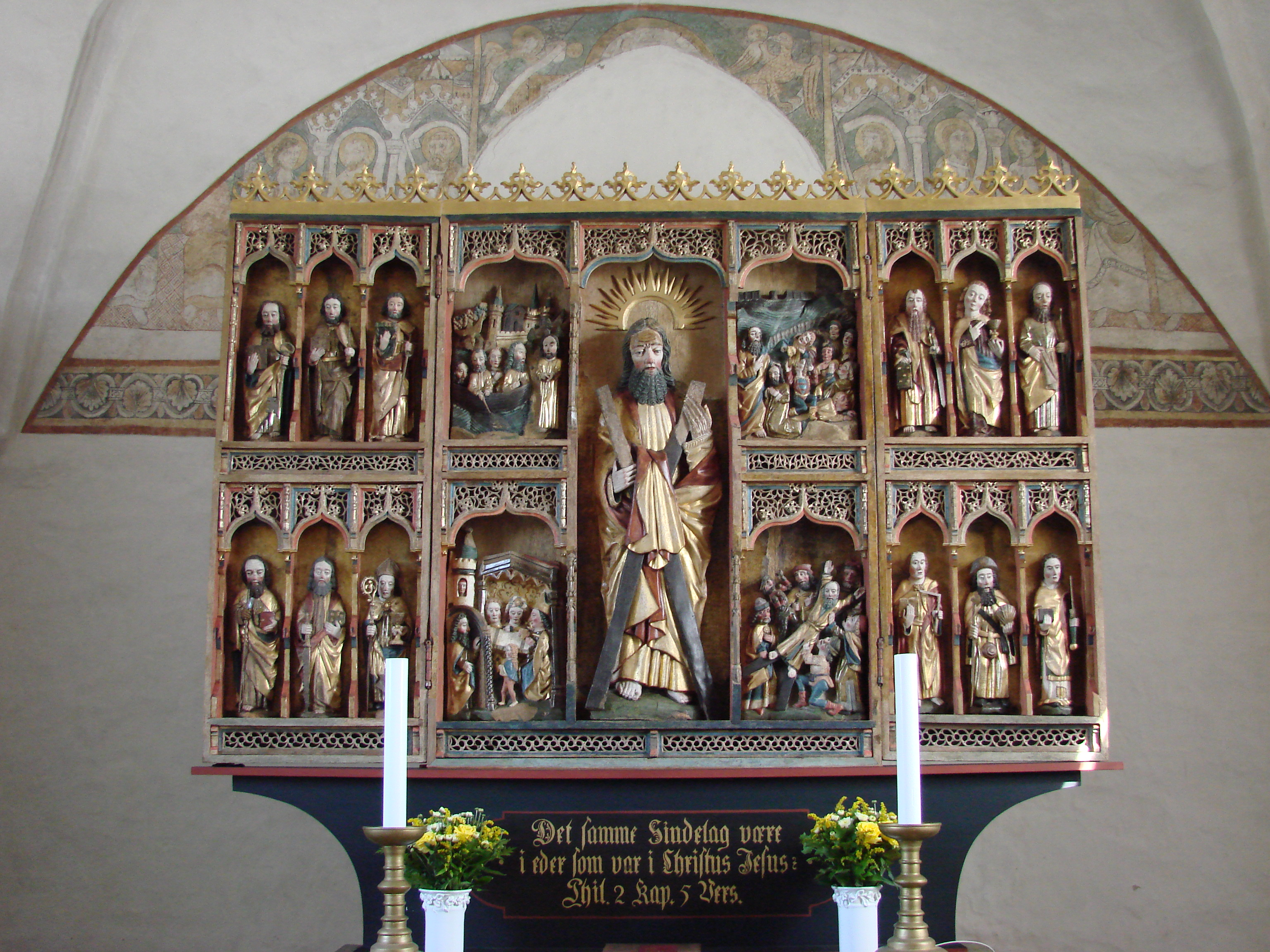
Altarpiece

The original nave and choir were constructed in the first half of the 13th century. Around 1480, the nave was expanded with cross vaults and the choir was heightened with limestone. The tower was added in the 16th century and a small sacristy was built about 1700.

The richly carved altar triptych and the pulpit are probably from the late 15th century or early 16th century.

== History ==
The holy spring known as Helsekilden which gave the village the name of Keldby in 1135, lost its significance after the end of the Danish-Swedish wars in the early 19th century. Records from 1372 show that the church was dedicated to St Andrew. In 1774, the church came under the jurisdiction of Marienborg. In 1913, it was transferred to private ownership.

The choir and the nave date from the Romanesque period while the tower is late Gothic. The original monk-brick building from 1200 to 1250 is well preserved. In the nave, there are a few indications of the former Romanesque windows, some having been completely bricked up. Two of the bricked-up doors also have rounded Romanesque arches. Around 1480, two vaults were constructed in the nave. In the choir, two vaults were also added, the one on the eastern side substantially wider than the western one. The nave's roofing was also added at the same time, as was the tower.

== Frescoes ==
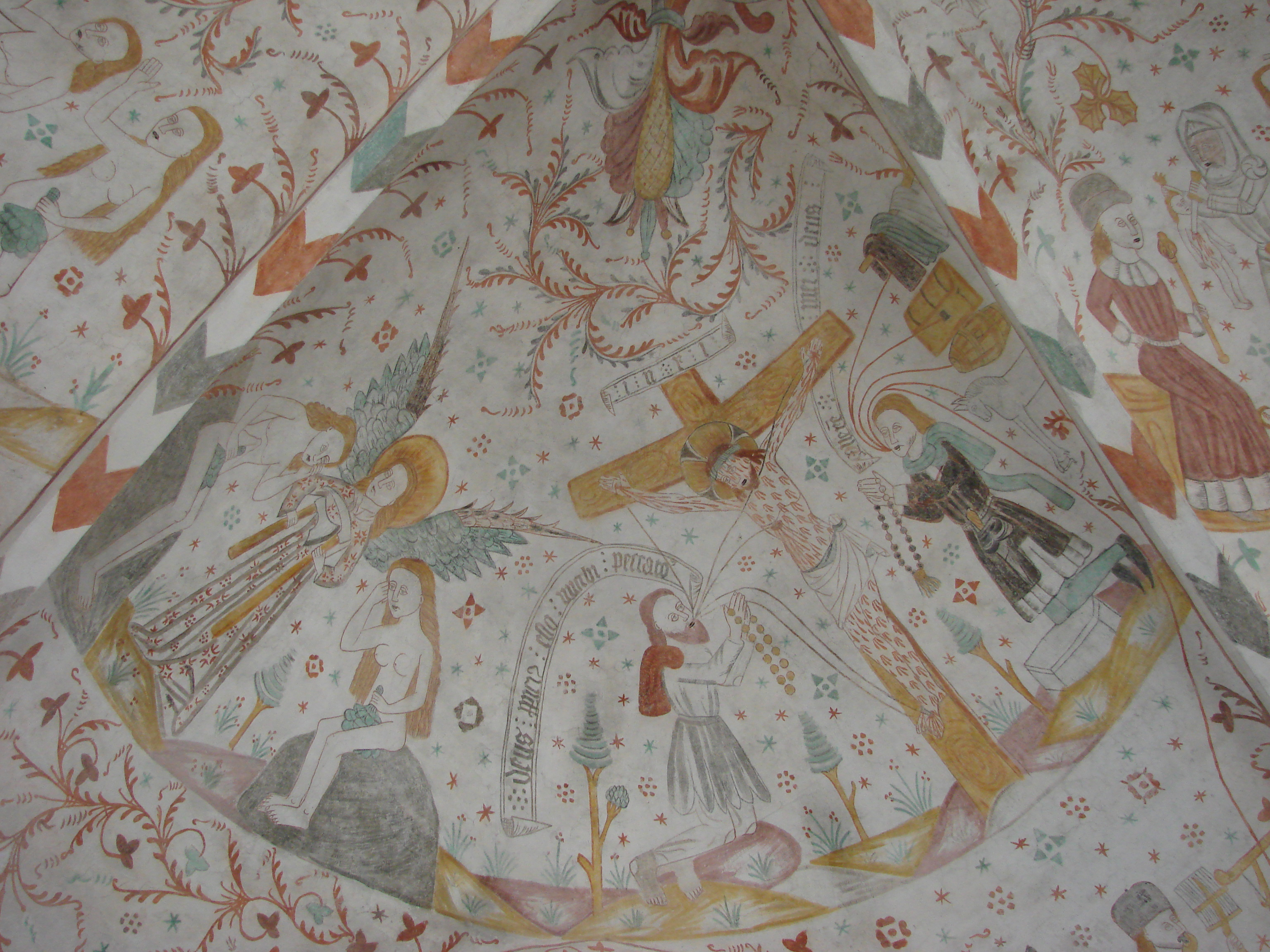
Fresco depicting Christ on the cross

The old frescoes were discovered in 1883 and restored by J. Kornerup in 1890. In 1934, smoke deposits from the old heating overs were removed as were Kornerup's painted additions. The wall paintings date from various periods. The oldest, of which only fragments remain, are from about 1275. They are located on the walls of the choir. A second series, from 1325, date from the decoration of the walls in the nave. A depiction of the Trinity can be seen over the triumphal arch. The walls are decorated with holy figures, standing or sitting, in varying formats. They include images of what appear to be the Archangel Gabriel and Uriel. They are followed by the apostles, including Batholomy, Paul, Jacob and Andrew. At the foot of the wall, in a quadrangular area, there is a crucifixion grouping with Mary, John and a warrior, possibly belonging to a now absent lateral altar.

On the south wall, the only remains are traces of a painting below the pulpit's sounding board. The eastern section of the north wall displays images of Moses, Aaron, Joachim, and of Anne before the golden gate of Jerusalem. There are also images from the New Testament including those of the birth of Jesus, the Flight to Egypt, the Sherherds in the Field and the Stoning of Stephen. There is also a series of paintings at the eastern end of the Romanesque windows to the north, including a large image of a man, sitting in an arcade, as well as depictions of a king and a queen. At the beginning of the 15th century, there are depictions of Fikke Lauridsen of Spejlsby, an important figure of his times.

At the end of the 15th century, the newly completed vaults were decorated by the so-called Elmelunde Master. At the head of the eastern wall, Christ can be seen together with Mary and John the Baptist. On the north side, Peter stands opening the Gates of Heaven, while to the south there are two long-sleeved devils dragging the damned down to hell. The other sections contain images from the New Testament. The birth of Jesus and the Three Kings can be seen, then Jesus in the Tempel.

== Other features ==
The late-Gothic triptych altarpiece is from the late 15th or early 16th century. The central figure is the saint to which the church is dedicated: Andrew with his cross. He is accompanied by lateral scenes from his legend. Recent research by the Danish National Museum has established the probable date of the triptych's creation as the beginning of the 16th century.

== Graveyard ==
- Peter Tetens Hald (1802-1864), politician and priest

== See also ==
- Church frescos in Denmark
- Fanefjord Church
- Elmelunde Master
