= Elmelunde Master =

Danish unidentified fresco painter

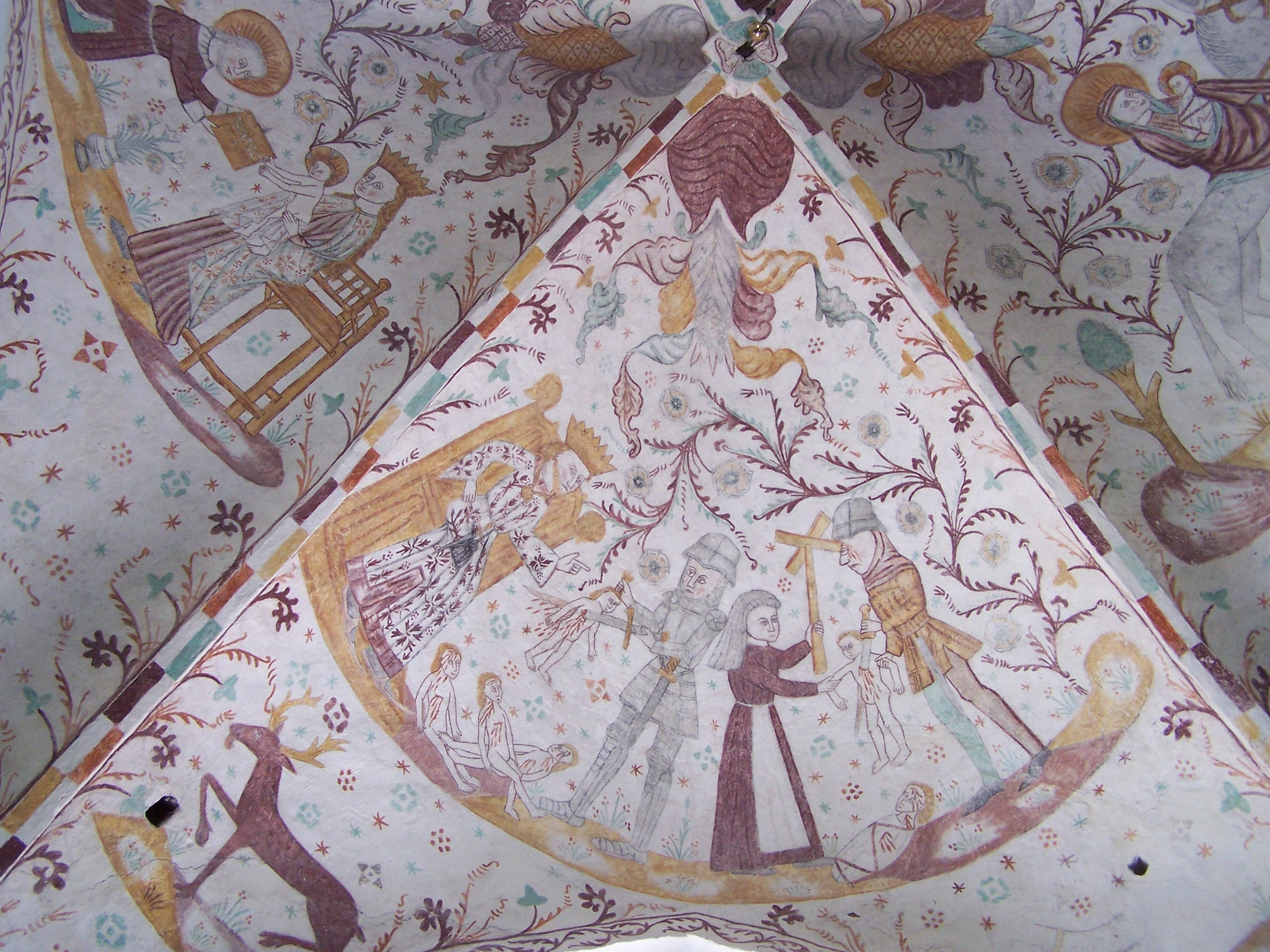
Frescos: Elmelunde Church

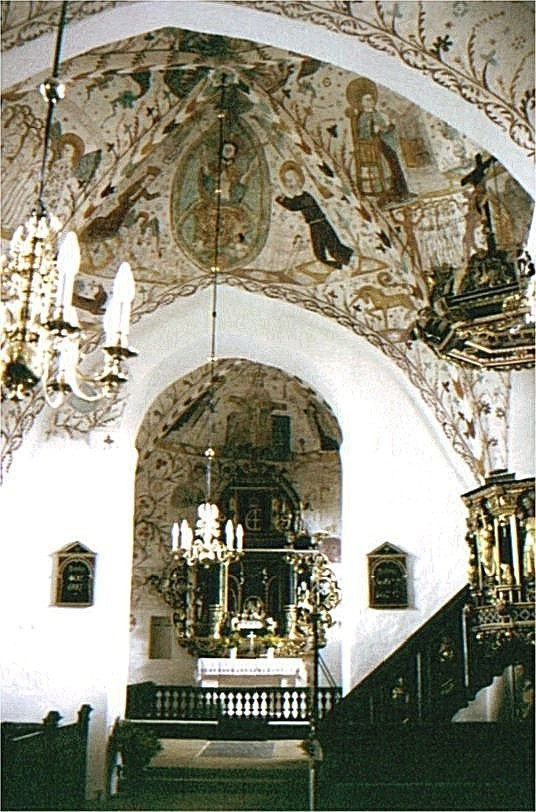
The nave: Elmelunde Church

The Elmelunde Master, Danish Elmelundemesteren, is the designation given to the nameless 16th-century artist who painted the frescos in the churches of Elmelunde, Fanefjord and Keldby on the island of Møn in south-eastern Denmark.

The naves of these three churches were furnished with Gothic cross vaults at the end of the 15th century providing an ideal surface for frescos of the Biblia pauperum (or people's bible) based on popular stories from the richly illustrated medieval manuscripts of the Old and New Testaments.

The artist can be recognised from his distinctive emblem present in one or more of the frescos in all three churches. His warm colours ranging from dark red and russet to pastel shades of yellow, green, grey and black are distinctive as are the faces of his figures who all have sleepy eyes whether in scenes of heaven or hell. Vines, flowers and tree branches complete the images.

In the 16th century, following the Reformation, the frescos were covered with coats of whitewash which hid them from view until quite recently. It was in the 1880s that they were first rediscovered in the church at Elmelunde with the result that the artist became known as the Elmelunde Master. It is however the frescos in Fanefjord Church uncovered in the 1930s which are considered to be the most interesting and comprehensive.

The Elmelunde Master's school is also credited with the frescos in churches on the neighbouring island of Falster at Tingsted, Nørre Alslev, Kettinge and Åstrup.

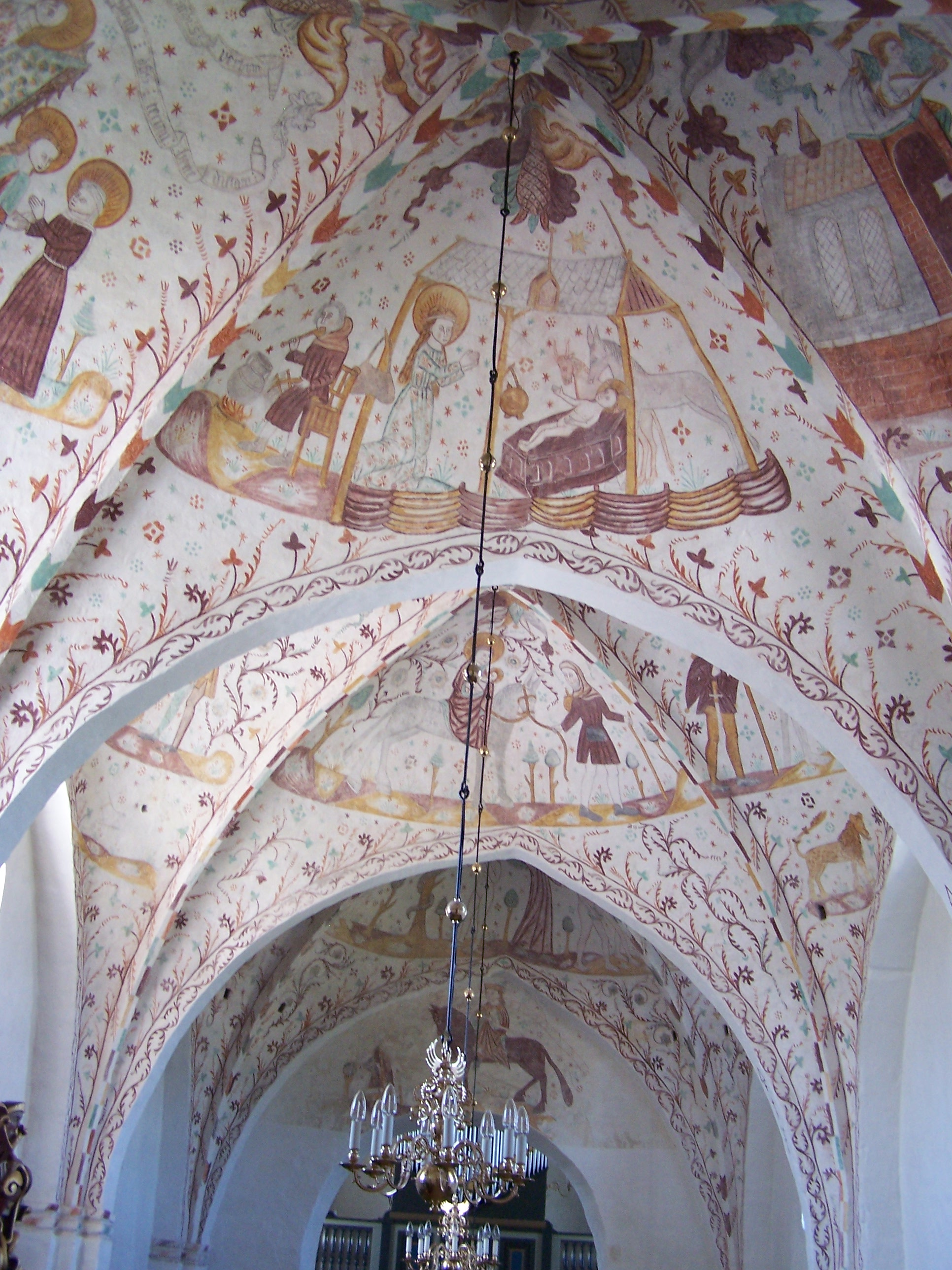
Elmelunde Church frescos

== See also ==
- Church frescos in Denmark
- Fanefjord Church
- Keldby Church
- Tingsted Church

== Sources ==
- Pastor Helge Buus: Fanefjord Kirke, Fanefjord menighedsråd, Askeby, 1978, Fanefjord menighedsråd, 19 p.
- Birgit Als Hansen: De Mønske Kirker, Møns Turistforening, Stege, 1967, 11 p. (translated 1976 as The churches of Møn)
- Annett Scavenius: Elmelundemestern i Fanefjord Kirke, Forlaget Vandkunsten, 2010, 121 pages. ISBN 978-87-7695-123-8.
