= Biblia pauperum =

Tradition of picture Bibles

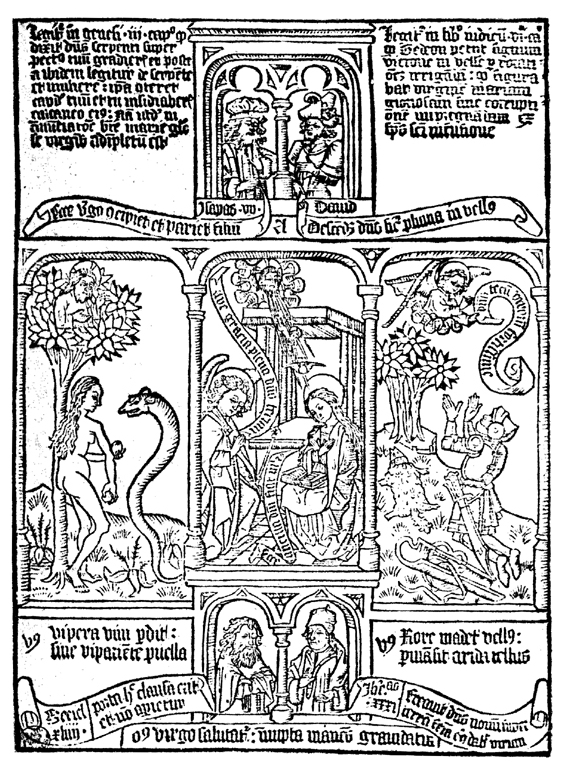
Three episodes from a block-book Biblia Pauperum illustrating typological correspondences between the Old and New Testaments: Eve and the serpent, the Annunciation, Gideon's miracle

The Biblia pauperum (Latin for "Paupers' Bible") was a tradition of picture Bibles beginning probably with Ansgar, and a common printed block-book in the later Middle Ages to visualize the typological correspondences between the Old and New Testaments. Unlike a simple "illustrated Bible", where the pictures are subordinated to the text, these Bibles placed the illustration in the centre, with only a brief text or sometimes no text at all. Words spoken by the figures in the miniatures could be written on scrolls coming out of their mouths. To this extent one might see parallels with modern comics.

The tradition is a further simplification of the Bible moralisée tradition, which was similar but with more text. Like these, the Biblia pauperum was usually in the local vernacular language, rather than Latin.

== History ==
Originally Paupers' Bibles took the form of colourful hand-painted illuminated manuscripts on vellum, though in the fifteenth century printed examples with woodcuts took over. The Biblia pauperum was among the commonest works put out in block-book form, mainly in the Netherlands and Germany, where both text and images were done entirely in a single woodcut for each page. The first of many editions printed using movable type was printed in German, in Bamberg in about 1462 by Albrecht Pfister; there were about eighteen incunabulum editions. A Biblia pauperum was not intended to be bought by the poor — some manuscripts were opulent and very expensive, although the block-book versions were far cheaper, and probably affordable by parish priests. The simpler versions were however probably used by the clergy as a teaching aid for those who could not read, which included most of the population. The name Biblia pauperum was applied by German scholars in the 1930s.

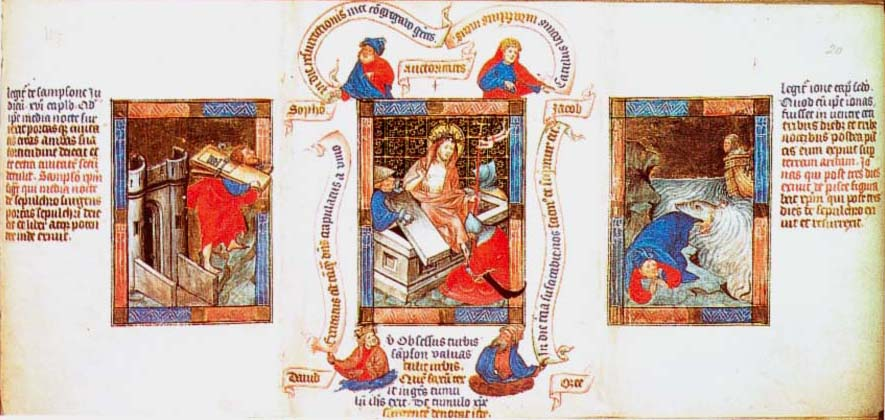
Christ rises from the tomb, alongside Jonah spit onto the beach. Kings Ms. 5, f. 20. Netherlands, beginning of the fifteenth century.

Each group of images in the Biblia pauperum is dedicated to one event from the Gospels, which is accompanied by two slightly smaller pictures of Old Testament events which prefigure the central one, according to belief of medieval theologians in typology; these parallels are explained in two blocks of text, and each of the three Biblical scenes is introduced with a Latin verse. Four Prophets hold scrolls with quotations from their Books, which prefigure the same event from the Gospels. For example, the scene of Longinus spearing Jesus as he hangs on the Cross is accompanied by God bringing forth Eve from the side of Adam, and Moses striking the rock so that water flowed forth, together with prophecies of Zechariah, the Psalms, the Lamentations and Amos.

The earliest manuscripts of the Biblia Pauperum were made in Bavaria and Austria in the 14th century, they have 34–36 groups. Later versions add more scenes, and one of the most detailed versions is the 50-part blockbook version, produced in the Netherlands in 1480–1495.

== Alternatives ==
The Biblia was rivalled by the Speculum Humanae Salvationis (Mirror of Human Salvation), another very popular compilation of typological pairings, with rather more text than the Biblia. The iconographical programmes of these books are shared with many other forms of medieval art, including stained glass windows and carvings of biblical subjects. Since books are more portable than these, they may well have been important in transmitting new developments in depicting the subjects. Most subjects, such as the Annunciation to the Shepherds, can be seen in a very similar form at different dates, in different media and different countries.

== See also ==
- Sequential art
- Medieval popular Bible
- List of most expensive books and manuscripts
