= List of churches in Vordingborg Municipality =

1: Køng 2: Lundby 3: Bårse 4: Præstø 5: Sværdborg 6: Udby 7: Beldringe 8: Skibinge 9: Jungshoved 10: Allerslev 11: Vordingborg 12: Kastrup 13: Ørslev 14: Øster Egesborg 15: Mern 16: Stensby 17: Kalvehave 18: Nyord 19: Stege 20: Keldby 21: Elmelunde 22: Borre 23: Magleby 24: Bogø 25: Fanefjord 26: Damsholte 27: Svinø

This is a list of churches in Vordingborg Municipality in southeastern Denmark. The municipality consists of the southernmost part of Zealand as well as several smaller islands, including Møn, Bogø and Nyord.

== Bogø ==
Name	Location	Year	Coordinates	Image	Refs
Bogø Church	Bogø	13th century	54°55′55.4″N 12°02′52.6″E		

== Møn ==
Name	Location	Year	Coordinates	Image	Refs
Borre Church	Borre	13th century			
Damsholte Church	Damsholte	1743	54°56′22.9″N 12°12′54.3″E		
Elmelunde Church	Ermelunde	1085	54°59′42″N 12°24′03″E		
Fanefjord Church		13th century	54°54′4.7″N 12°09′3.5″E		
Keldby Church	Keldby	13th century	54°49′27.7″N 12°20′38.08″E		
Magleby Church	Jægersborg	13th century	54°59′3.48″N 12°29′3.48″E		
Stege Church	Stege	13th century	54°59′2.9″N 12°17′2.7″E		

== Nyord ==
Name	Location	Year	Coordinates	Image	Refs
Nyord Church	Nyord	1845			

== Zealand ==
Name	Location	Year	Coordinates	Image	Refs
Allerslev Church	Allerslev	c. 1100			
Bårse Church	Bårse	c. 1300	55°7′37.2″N 11°57′13.67″E		
Beldringe Church	Beldringe	13th century			
Church of Our Lady	Vordingborg	c. v. 1450			
Jungshoved Church	Jungshoved	13th century	54°59′51.72″N 12°08′39.11″E		
Kalvehave Church	Kalvehave	c. 1250			
Kastrup Church	Kastrup		55°02′13.56″N 11°53′35.16″E		
Køng Church	Svinø	c. 1250			
Lundby Church	Lundby				
Mern Church	Mern	c. 1189			
Ørslev Church	Ørslev	c. 1150			
Øster Egesborg Church	Øster Egesborg	c. 1225			
Præstø Church	Præstø	15th century			
Skibinge Church	Skibinge	13th century			
Stensby Church	Stensby	1891			
Sværdborg Church	Sværdborg	c. 1250			
Svinø Church	Svinø	1900	55°06′31.48″N 11°45′12.76″E		
Udby Church	Udby				

== See also ==
- List of churches on Falster
- List of churches on Lolland
- List of churches in Roskilde Municipality
