= Damsholte Church =

Coordinates: 54°56′22.9″N 12°12′54.3″E

- Damsholte Kirke
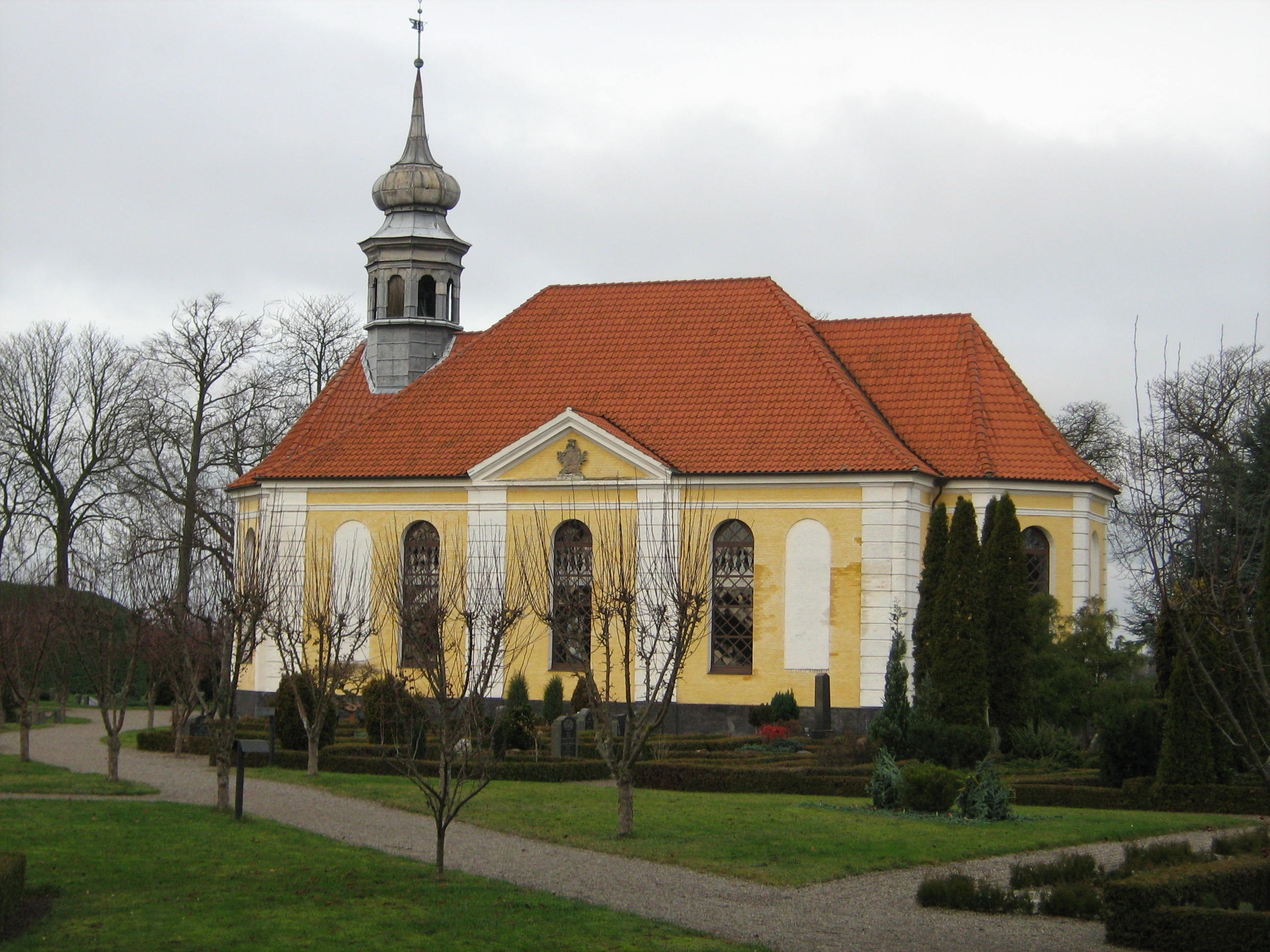
- Damsholte Church
- Location: Damsholte, Møn
- Country: Denmark
- Denomination: Church of Denmark
- Website: www.damsholtekirke.dk

Architecture
- Architect: Philip de Lange
- Style: Rococo
- Years built: 1741–1743

Administration
- Diocese: Diocese of Roskilde
- Deanery: Stege-Vordingborg Provsti
- Parish: Damsholte Sogn

Damsholte Church, located in the village of Damsholte on the island of Møn in southeastern Denmark, is the only village church in the country built in the Rococo style. It is considered to be one of Denmark's finest Rococo buildings.

== History ==
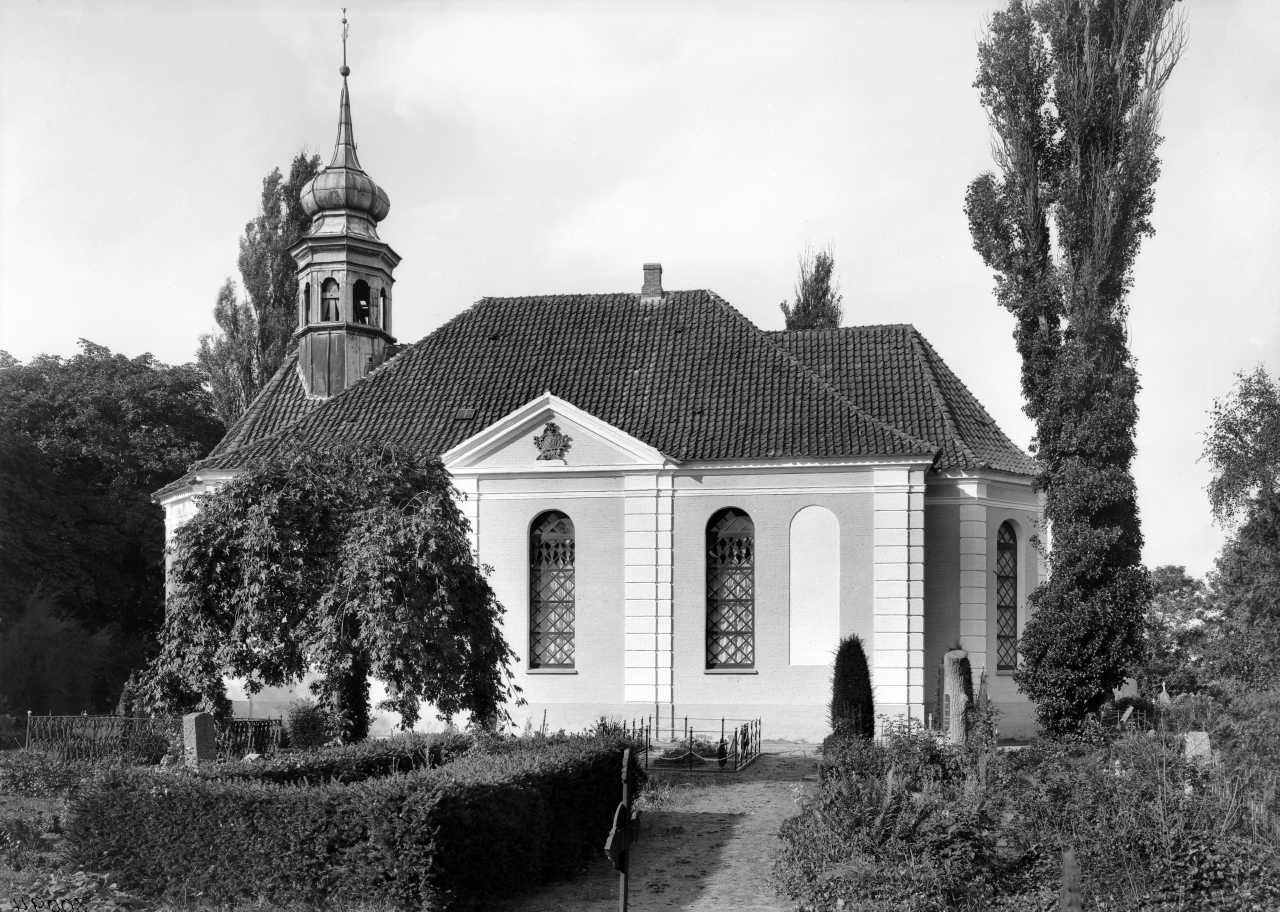
Damsholte Church in 1932

Damsholte Church, with its pale yellow Rococo facade, is unlike any other parish church in Denmark. Its origins, which are comparatively recent, are also unusual.

At the beginning of the 18th century, the population of Damsholte and its surroundings had grown so much that there was a real need for a local church. That, at any rate, was the opinion of Provost Jæger in nearby Stege. It is said that at a sumptuous reception in honour of a royal visit by Christian VI, he convinced the king that Damsholte should become a parish in its own right. There is no historical record of the incident but, in any event, in 1740 there was a royal decree that the western part of Stege parish should be separated off.

The king contributed 3,000 rigsdaler to the cost of building the church. Each of the other churches on Møn contributed 1,000 rigsdaler while all the other churches in Denmark contributed 1 rigsdaler each.

Designed by Philip de Lange, one of the most prominent architects of the day, the church was completed in 1743. A finely proportioned Rococo church thus came into being in the midst of West Møn's pleasant rolling farmland, the only one of its kind in a Danish village.

== Architecture and furnishings ==
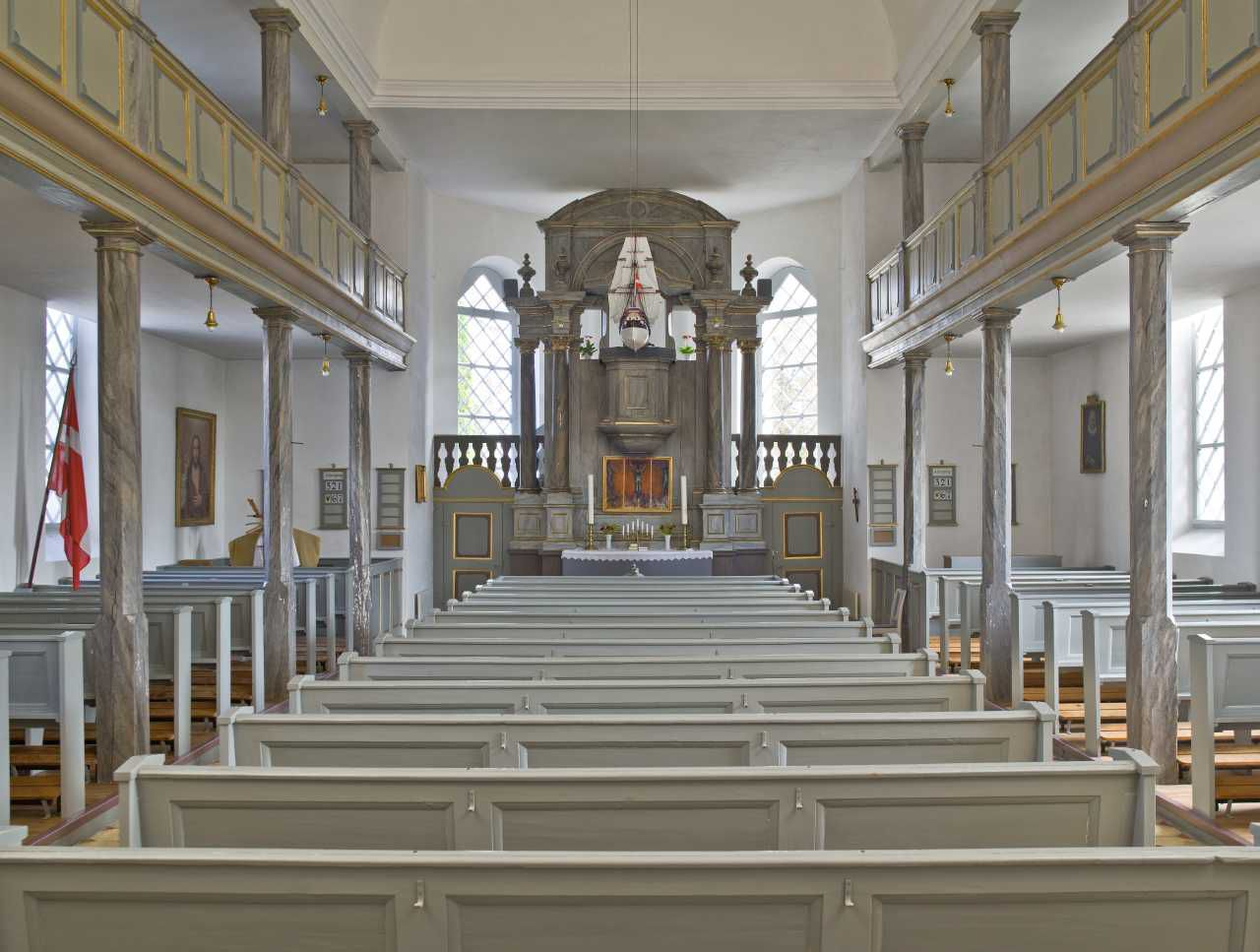
The interior in 2018

The church consists of a rectangular nave with two pentagonal extensions to east and west. White pilasters decorate each of the corners. Christian VI's monogram can be seen in the triangular gables topping the outer walls of the nave. The west door and all the windows have rounded arches.

The red-tiled roof is divided into three main sections covering the nave and the extensions. At the western end of the building, it is crowned with an octagonal lantern and onion spire.

The bright, yellow-tinted exterior with its onion spire is impressive enough. But those entering the double doors and proceeding through the small inner porch are struck by the rather sombre, well-ordered interior with its pious restraint and dominant altarpiece. Monumental pillars supporting the gallery stretch down either side of the nave to the lofty altar with its integrated pulpit, set high above the triptych. All built of wood, they are painted in subdued tones of grey.

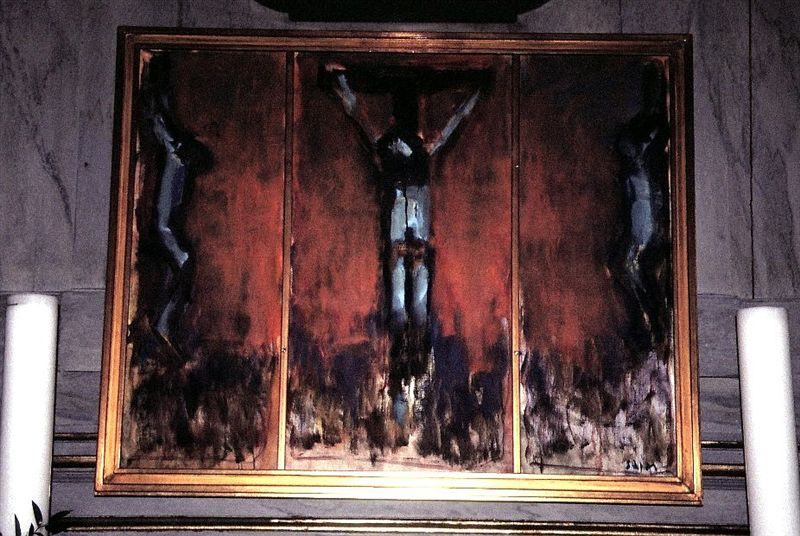
Altarpiece painting of Christ on the cross (1993) by Sven Havsteen-Mikkelsen

The austerity of Lutheran pietism is ubiquitous. The short benches are designed to keep their occupants awake. And a modern triptych of Jesus' crucifixion with the two robbers on either side decorates the altar. It was completed in 1993 by Sven Havsteen-Mikkelsen. On the northern wall, there is a picture of Christ by Eckersberg (1825) while a recently restored figure of Christ occupies a small niche. To one side, a memorial plaque honours those who fell in the war of 1864. On the south wall, there is a picture of the resurrection by Niels Skovgaard together with a portrait of Damsholte's first pastor, Rasmus Platou.

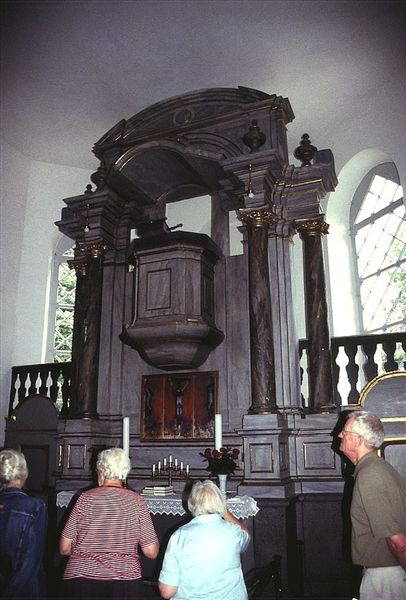
The altar with integrated pulpit

Hanging in the nave, a faithful copy of the warship Prince Christian commemorates the part it played in the Battle of Zealand Point in March 1808.

The two brass candlesticks on the altar were donated at the church's consecration. The wrought iron altar rails display the monograms of Christian VI and Sophia Magdalen. The font, surprisingly enough, is made of wood complete with wooden cover.

Despite its austerity, the church bears a clear resemblance to the theatres of the day. The stage is set around the altar with the high-flying pulpit. And the audience is accommodated on the floor of the nave as well as up in the gallery, exactly as in contemporary auditoriums. There is therefore a clear contrast between Damsholte Church and many other churches in Denmark with the severe tones of its theatrical backdrop and the interior's dark, monumental elegance.

== Churchyard ==
In the churchyard, there is a burial mound for the Tutein family which, for a time, lived in Marienborg Manor which stands behind it.

To the north of the church, a burial vault houses the remains of Antoine de la Calmette, who was governor of Møn and Nykøbing, and his wife Lisa Iselin, for whom he created Liselund, a park adjacent to Møns Klint at the eastern end of the island.

Other notable people buried in the graveyard include:

- Peter Adolph Tutein (1797-1885), politician
- Elsa Gress (1919-1988), writer
- Clifford Charles Wright (1919-1999), architect and painter

== Gallery ==
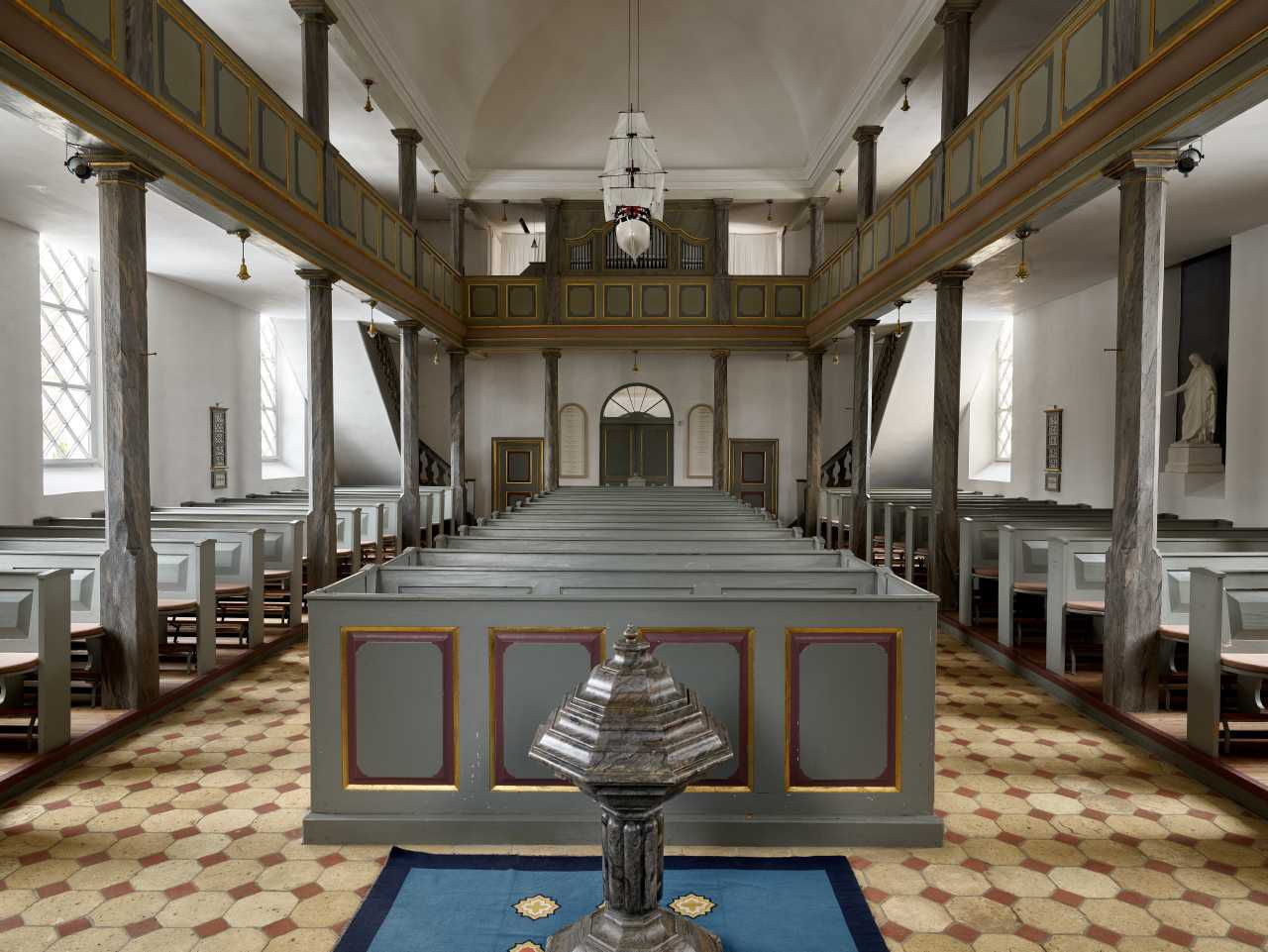
Interior

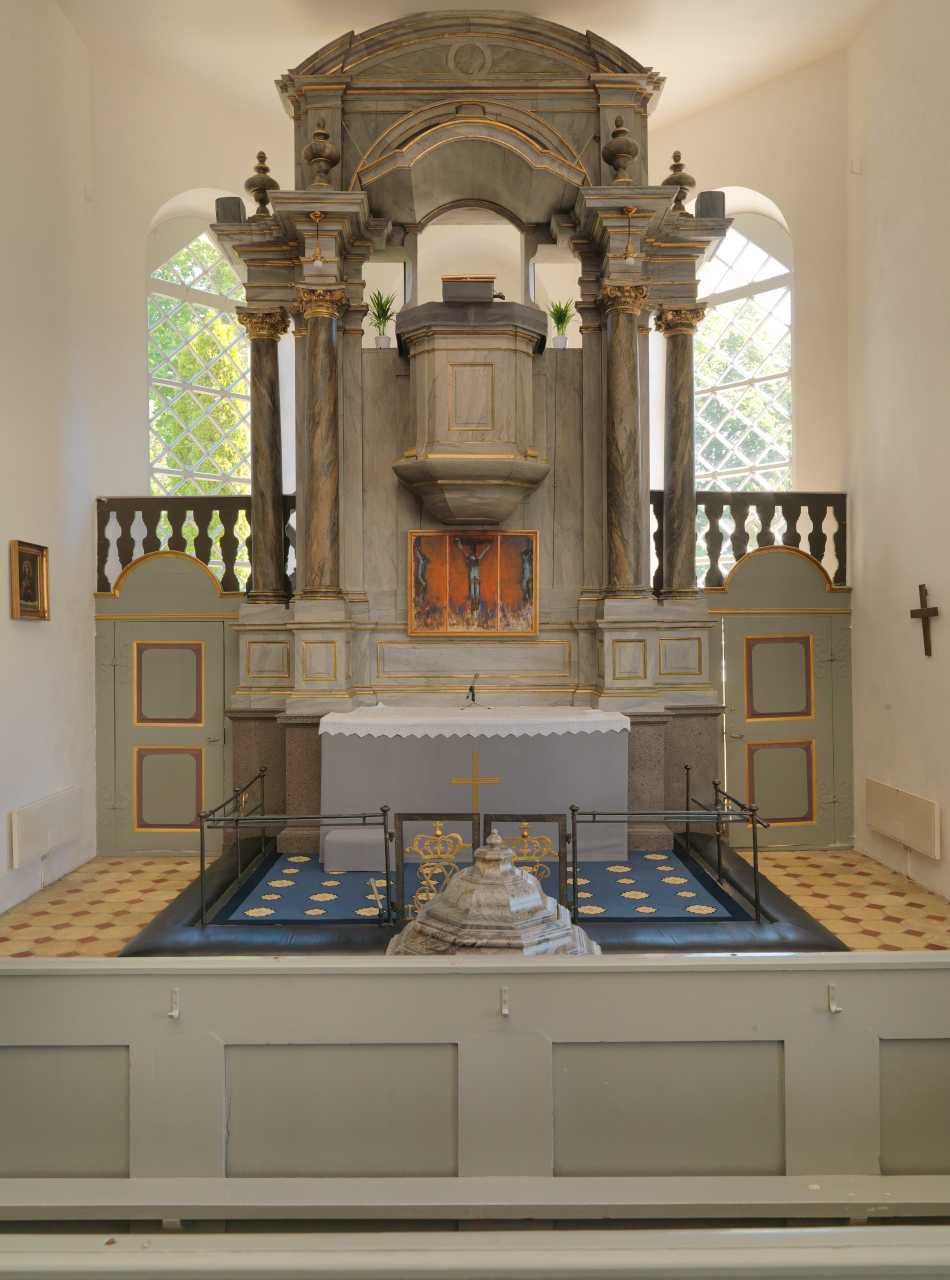
Interior

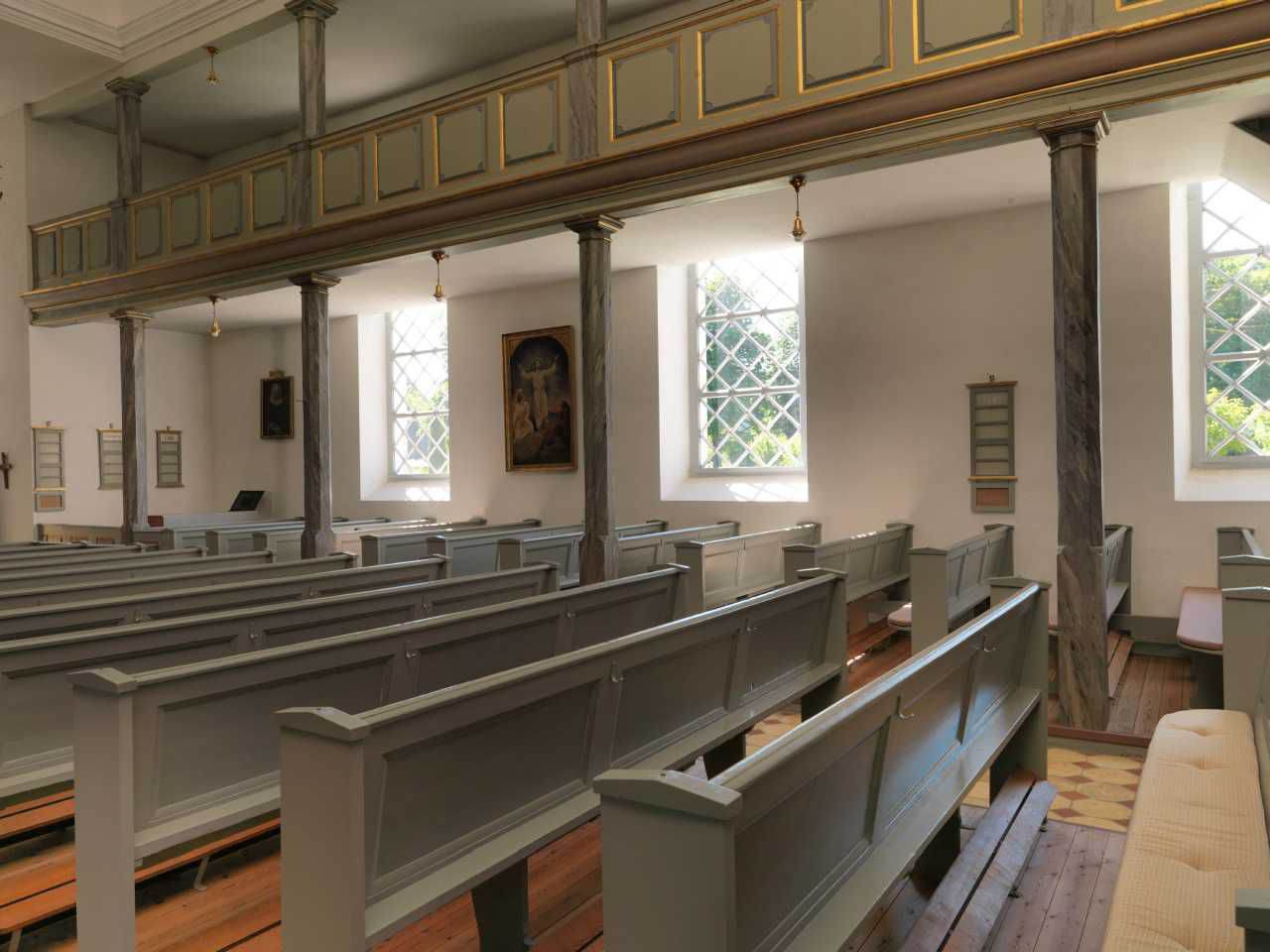
Interior
