= David Gress =

Danish historian (born 1953)

David Richard Gress (born 29 January 1953) is a Danish historian, known for his 1998 survey From Plato to Nato on Western identity and grand narratives.

== Life ==
He was born in Copenhagen, the son of R. W. B. Lewis, an American literary historian, and the Danish writer, playwright and essayist Elsa Gress. The two were not married, which is why Gress uses his mother's maiden name. She subsequently married the American painter Charles Clifford Wright.

He attended Sorø Akademis Skole. He was later educated in Classics at Cambridge University, England, and Bryn Mawr College, Pennsylvania, where he received his Ph.D. in medieval history in 1981. From 1982 to 1992 he was a fellow of the Hoover Institution at Stanford University, publishing articles and books on international strategy, the West German peace movement, U.S. foreign policy, Nordic politics, and a history of West Germany. From 1993 to 1995 he was visiting fellow at Gonville and Caius College, Cambridge, and lecturer in international history there. From 1996 to 1999 he was a fellow at the Danish Institute of International Affairs and from 1999 to 2001 assistant professor of Classics at the University of Aarhus, Denmark. In 2001-03 he was professor of the history of civilizations at Boston University and has since 2003 been based in Denmark, where he continues to publish articles and books in political philosophy, the origins of Western prosperity, contemporary history and political culture. He is a well-known face in the public debate of Denmark.

He has been a fellow of the Danish Institute of International Affairs and director of the Center for Studies on America and the West at the Foreign Policy Research Institute, Philadelphia. As of 2004 he has been a columnist in the Danish daily newspaper Jyllands-Posten. David Gress is also a frequently used media commentator, and a senior fellow of the Danish think tank CEPOS.

== Work ==
In his first book, 'Demokrati eller?' Gress provided a justification of liberal democracy. It included a defense of ecological production, something that Gress has since disavowed. His doctoral dissertation was a critical edition of a 13th-century papal biography. 'Peace and Survival' was a philosophical and political history and critique of the pacifist mentality, with particular reference to the West German peace movement, which in his view was surrendering to Soviet power. Apart from various shorter works on Nordic politics and U.S. foreign policy, his next major work followed on from 'Peace and Survival' to provide a political, social, and economic history of the Federal Republic of Germany. The first edition appeared in the fall of 1989, a French edition in 1992 and a second in English in 1993; these included a survey of the unification of Germany and a look back at the history of East Germany.

From Plato to Nato was, amongst other things, an intervention in the campus culture wars, explaining that the narrative model of 'The West', in the general style of Will Durant, had become threadbare. His proposed replacement marked him as, in general terms, a Burkean conservative. He argued that 'The West' was in operative terms much more of a complex compound of elements he identified as 'Old West', of Roman and Germanic provenance, with modern Adam Smith economics, than a pure play on the Enlightenment philosophy. The book's development is complex and somewhat muddied by the wish also to be inclusive of other conservative views. Norman Davies, a Polish history specialist critical of incoherent definitions of Europe viewed from the Atlantic end, has lent some support to the outline thesis.

Gress has further identified the campus debates as a target, with an attack on Martin Bernal and other interventions in U.S. and British journals of opinion.

From 2003 to 2012 he published mostly in Danish, including two books and numerous articles, reviews, and comments in Danish daily newspapers, chiefly Jyllands-Posten, but from 2009 also Politiken. One, more polemical, focus has been criticism of the Nordic welfare state and environmental policy, another has been periodic surveys of international publications and research on U.S. politics and society, history, and religion. He has been one of the most outspoken Danish opponents of the scientific consensus on climate change, and has accordingly received heavy criticism by Danish scientists.

== Major works ==
- "Demokrati eller?" (1978)
- "Gesta Innocentii III: Introduction, Text and Commentary" (1981) doctoral dissertation
- "Peace and Survival" (1985)
- "A History of West Germany" (1989) with Dennis L. Bark; French edition 1992, second English edition 1993
- "From Plato to NATO: The Idea of the West and Its Opponents" (1998)
- "Det bedste guld - en bog om frihed" ('The best gold - a book on freedom') (2005)
- "Velstandens kilder" ('The Origins of Wealth', in cooperation with CEPOS) (2007)
- "Egne veje" ('Own paths'), memoirs (2011)
