= Elsa Gress =

Danish writer

- Born: 17 January 1919; Frederikshavn
- Died: 18 July 1988 (aged 69); Damsholte
- Education: Copenhagen University
- Occupations: Essayist, novelist, dramatist
- Spouse: Charles Clifford Wright (m. 1956)
- Partner: R.W.B. Lewis (1950–1952)
- Children: 3, including David
- Writing career
- Language: Danish
- Period: 1945–1981

Elsa Judith Elisa Gress (17 January 1919 – 18 July 1988) was a Danish essayist, novelist and dramatist. In Denmark, she is remembered above all for her essays.

== Biography ==
Born in Frederikshavn, Gress was brought up in Ordrup where her father lost the family fortune at the races. She went through a difficult childhood as the family was forced to move frequently from one home to another. After matriculating from Ordrup Gymnasium in 1937, she studied literature at Copenhagen University. During the Second World War, she participated in the resistance, narrowly avoiding capture on one occasion. As a result of the war atrocities, both her boyfriend and her brother Palle committed suicide, causing her great pain. Her debut consisted of a volume of essays, Strejftog (Raids, 1947), and a novel, Mellemspil (Interlude, 1947), both inspired by her war experiences and her subsequent grief. Her other novels, Salamander (1977) and Simurghen (1986) were written much later.

Gress's memoirs openly describe the events of her life. They were published in three volumes: Mine mange hjem (My Many Homes, 1965), Fuglefri og fremmed (Free as a Bird and a Stranger, 1971) and Compania 1—2 (1976). She wrote her first play Philoctetes Wounded (1969) in English, publishing the Danish version, Den sårede Filoktet, the following year.

Gress met her first lover, the American literary critic R.W.B. Lewis in 1950 while attending a seminar on American Studies in Salzburg, continuing the affair in the United States until 1952. Although she was pregnant, her visa was not renewed forcing her to return to Denmark where her first son David was born. Her interest in the United States continued, encouraging her to write critical but well-informed accounts of the McCarthy era in Nye strejftog, a collection of essays published in 1957.

While in New York in 1952, she met the painter Charles Clifford Wright at the Yaddo Artists Colony. In 1956, he joined her in Copenhagen where they married and had two children together, Barbara and Jonathan. Together with her husband, Gress created the Decenter artistic centre in Glumsø, attracting guests from around the globe to exhibitions, theatrical performances and lectures. The American film director Tom O'Horgan, whom Gress had met in the United States, staged her play Den sårede Filoktet on television in 1976, establishing her reputation as a dramatist. As a result of financial difficulties, the family had to sell Decenter in 1971, after which they moved to the forester's residence at Marienborg in Damsholte on the island of Møn. Elsa Gress died there on 18 July 1988.

== Works ==
Elsa Gress's principal works include:

- Strejftog (1945)
- Mellemspil (1947)
- Jorden er ingen stjerne (1956)
- Nye strejftog (1957)
- Prometheus på flugt (1961)
- Er der nogen der hører efter? (1964)
- Det uopdagede køn (1964)
- Mine mange hjem (1965)
- Det professionelle menneske (1966)
- Den sårede Filoktet (1970)
- Fuglefri og fremmed (1971)
- Den sårede Filoktet (1974)
- Compañia (1976)
- Salamander (1976)
- Blykuglen (1984)
- Simurghen (1986)
- Udsigter og Indsigter (1981)
