= Antoine de Bosc de la Calmette =

Danish County Governor, geheimrat, and landowner (1752–1803)

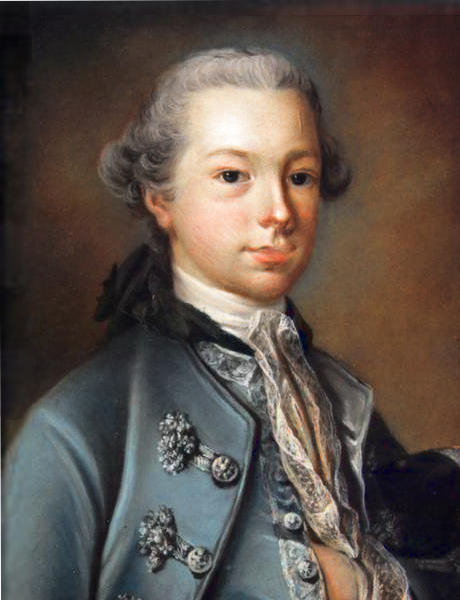
Antoine de Bosc de la Calmette

Gérard Pierre Antoine de Bosc de la Calmette, often referred to as Antoine de la Calmette, (21 September 1752 – 7 April 1803) was a Danish county governor, geheimrat, and landowner. He is, however, remembered above all as an artist and landscape architect, contributing to Danish Romanticism, especially in the design of Liselund on the island of Møn with its English garden, thatched summer residence and distributed buildings in various styles.

== Early life ==
Born in Lisbon, Portugal, Calmette was the son of the Dutch resident minister of the States-General to Portugal, Charles François de Bosc de la Calmette, a Huguenot who had left France to avoid religious persecution. His mother was Antoinette Elisabeth de Godin. During the 1755 Lisbon earthquake, he was with his brother, Charles Louis de Bosc de la Calmette; they were saved by their governess who rescued them from a burning building. He came with his parents to Denmark in 1759 when his father was transferred to Copenhagen.

About 1770, the Calmette family acquired the 15th century royal farm of Sømarkegård, a swampy area at the northeastern end of Møns Klint. The father also acquired Marienborg Manor on Møn which he left to Antoine when he died in 1781.

In 1777, Calmette married Anna Catharina Elisabeth (Lisa) Baroness Iselin (1759-1805), the daughter of Reinhard Iselin, a highly successful Swiss merchant employed by the Danish State. In 1781, she inherited Rosenfeldt Manor, just west of Vordingborg.

== Career ==
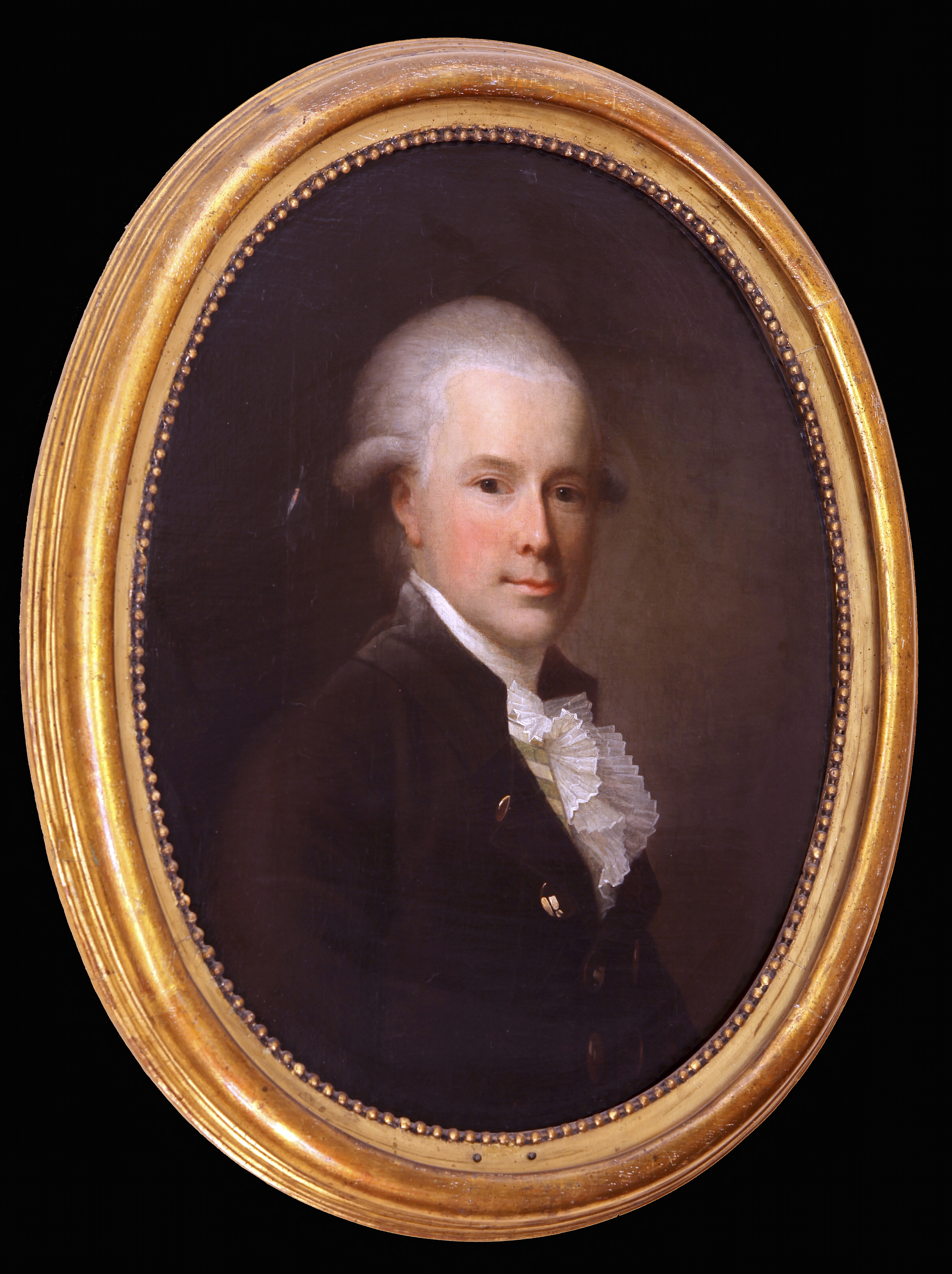
Antoine de Bosc de la Calmette painted by Jens Juel

In 1769, Calmette held the rank of Cornet. In 1772, he served as captain of a cavalry regiment. In 1774, he was appointed chamberlain, and in 1777, he was naturalized as a Danish nobleman. In 1783, he became governor of Møn (Møn Amt) and in 1794, also of Nykøbing. In 1793 (or 1801), he received the Order of the Dannebrog. Calmette also took an interest in prehistoric monuments, excavating Møn's Neolithic burial mound, Klekkende Høj, in 1797 while he was governor. In 1803, he was elevated to the position of Geheimrat.

== Contribution to art ==
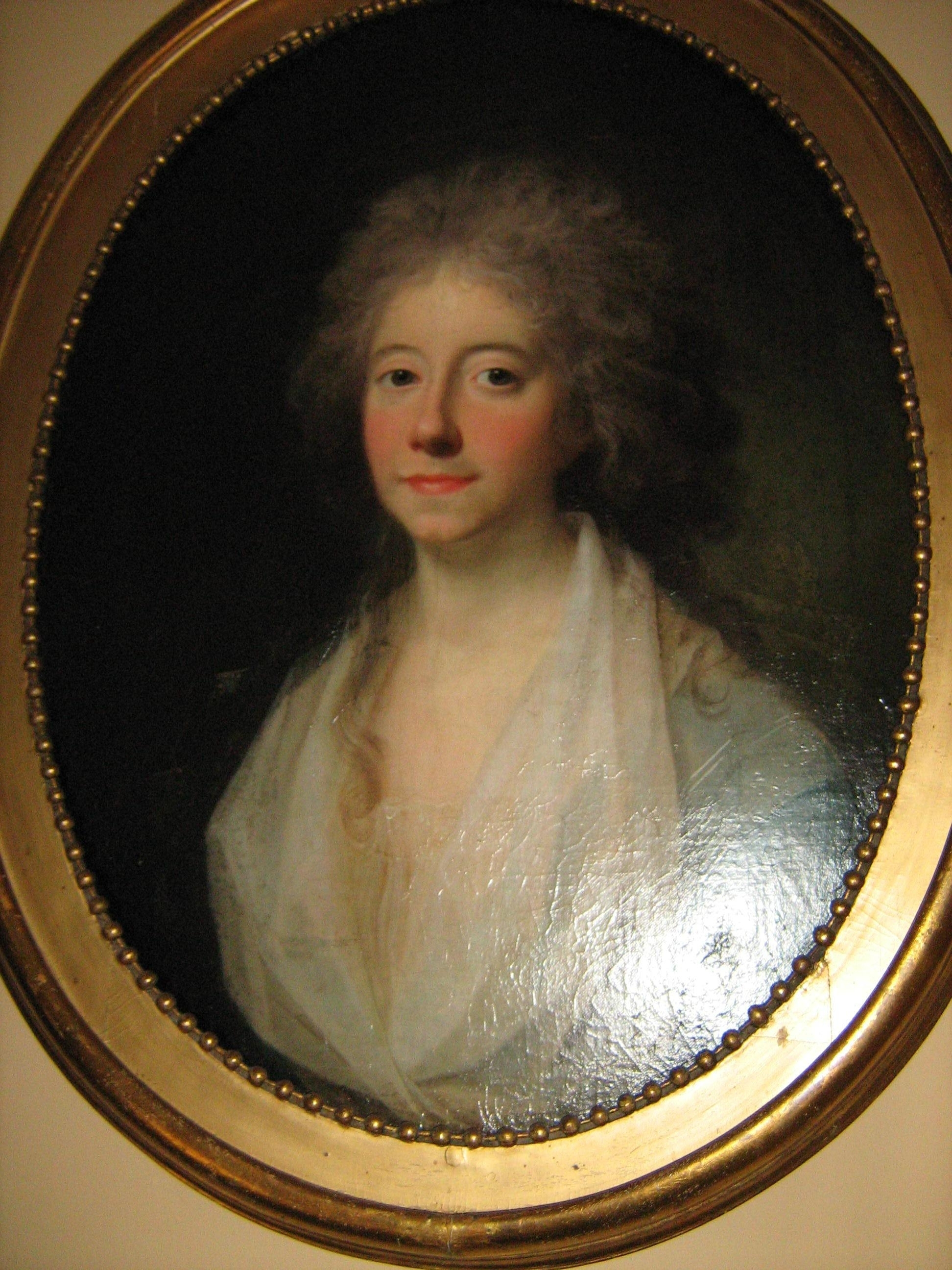
Calmette's wife, Lisa

Calmette was a figure of his time, inspired by the Age of Enlightenment and by philosophers such as Jean-Jacques Rousseau. He had also taken a specific interest in the gardens and parks of England and France. While he was a competent draftsman and painter, his masterpiece was the layout and landscaping of Sømarkegård, renamed Liselund after his wife. In 1783, together with his wife, he developed a Romantic garden with winding paths, lakes and canals, and buildings of various styles, fully in accordance with the ideals of the times. While travelling widely across Europe in 1790, he had been attracted by the style of the romantic English landscape garden, a favourite with the nobility of the day. Here nature was allowed to thrive in large parks studded with monuments, temples and ornamental buildings.

While he entrusted Andreas Kirkerup with the design of the garden's centerpiece, a thatched manor serving as a summer residence, it was Calmette himself who developed the garden, bringing in rare plants, shrubs and trees, all carefully laid out in accordance with a detailed plan. His knowledge of architecture also seems to have contributed to the design of the various buildings around the park. He was certainly inspired to design the Chinese pavilion after visiting Copenhagen's Frederiksberg Park as can be seen from his drawing of the park's Chinese pavilion and bridge (c. 1798). Calmette and his wife spent ten years laying out the garden which was completed only four years before his death.

Bosc de la Calmette died in Copenhagen; he and his wife are buried in a chapel in Damsholte Churchyard, adjacent to Marienborg on Møn.

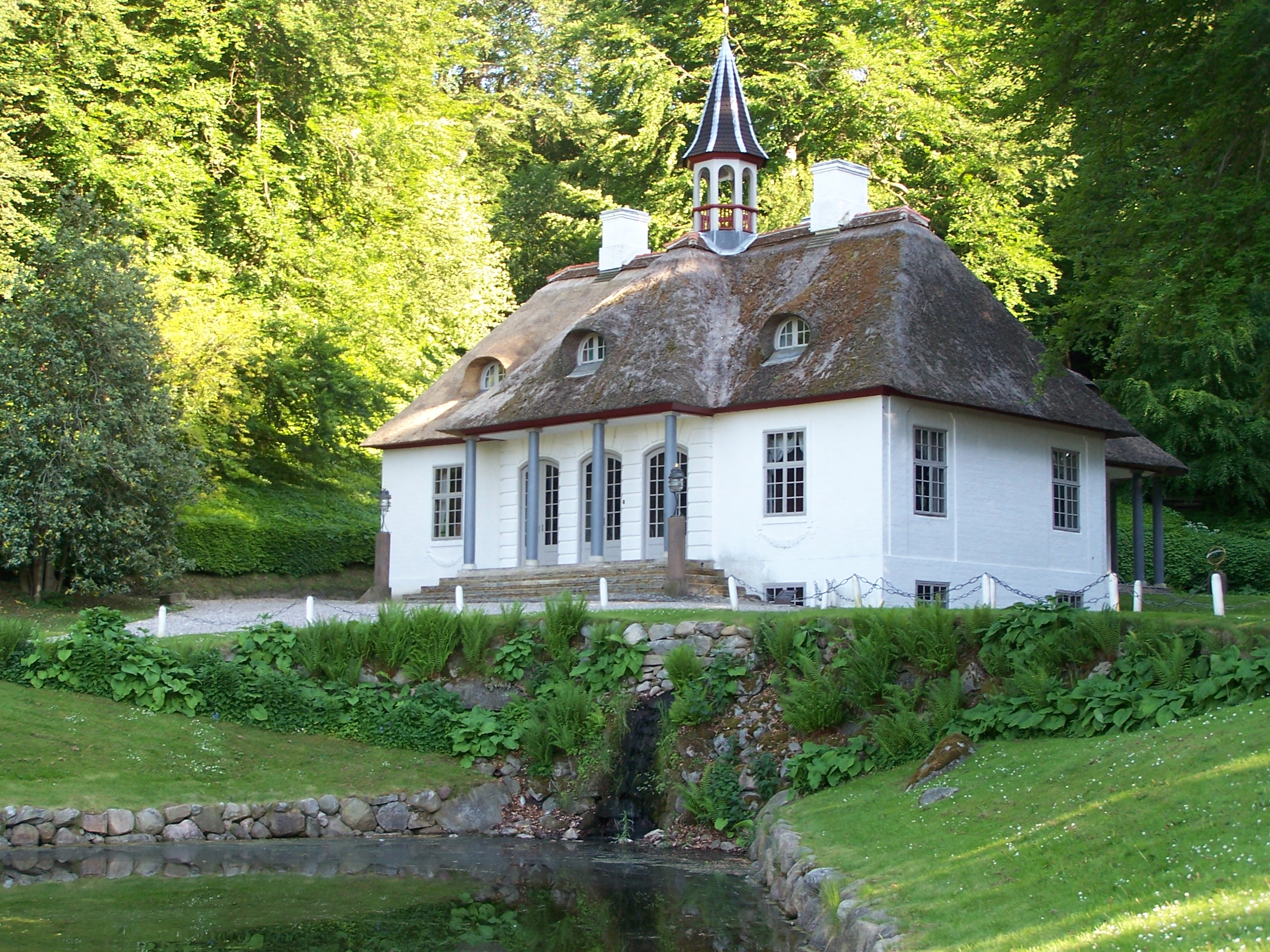
The thatched summer residence at Liselund

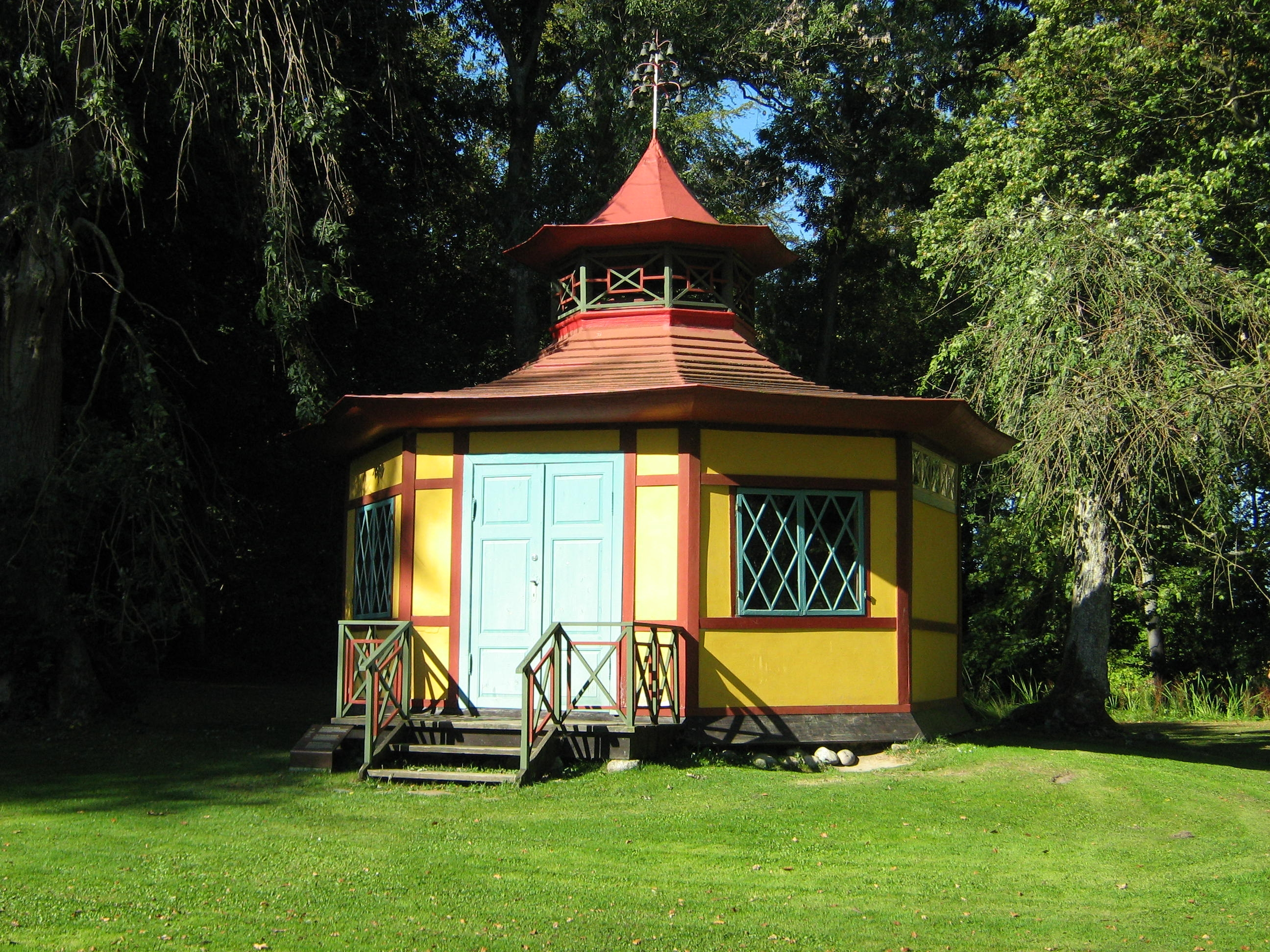
The Chinese summer house, Liselund

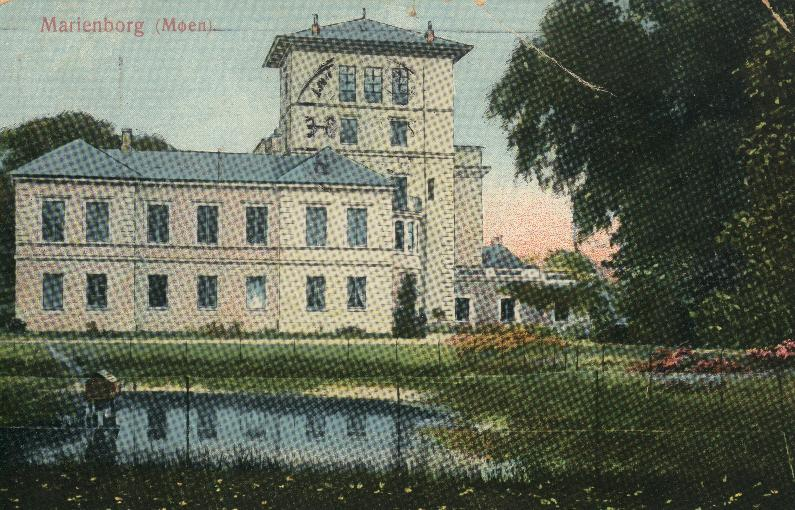
Marienborg, Calmette's residence on Møn
