= Damsholte =

- Village
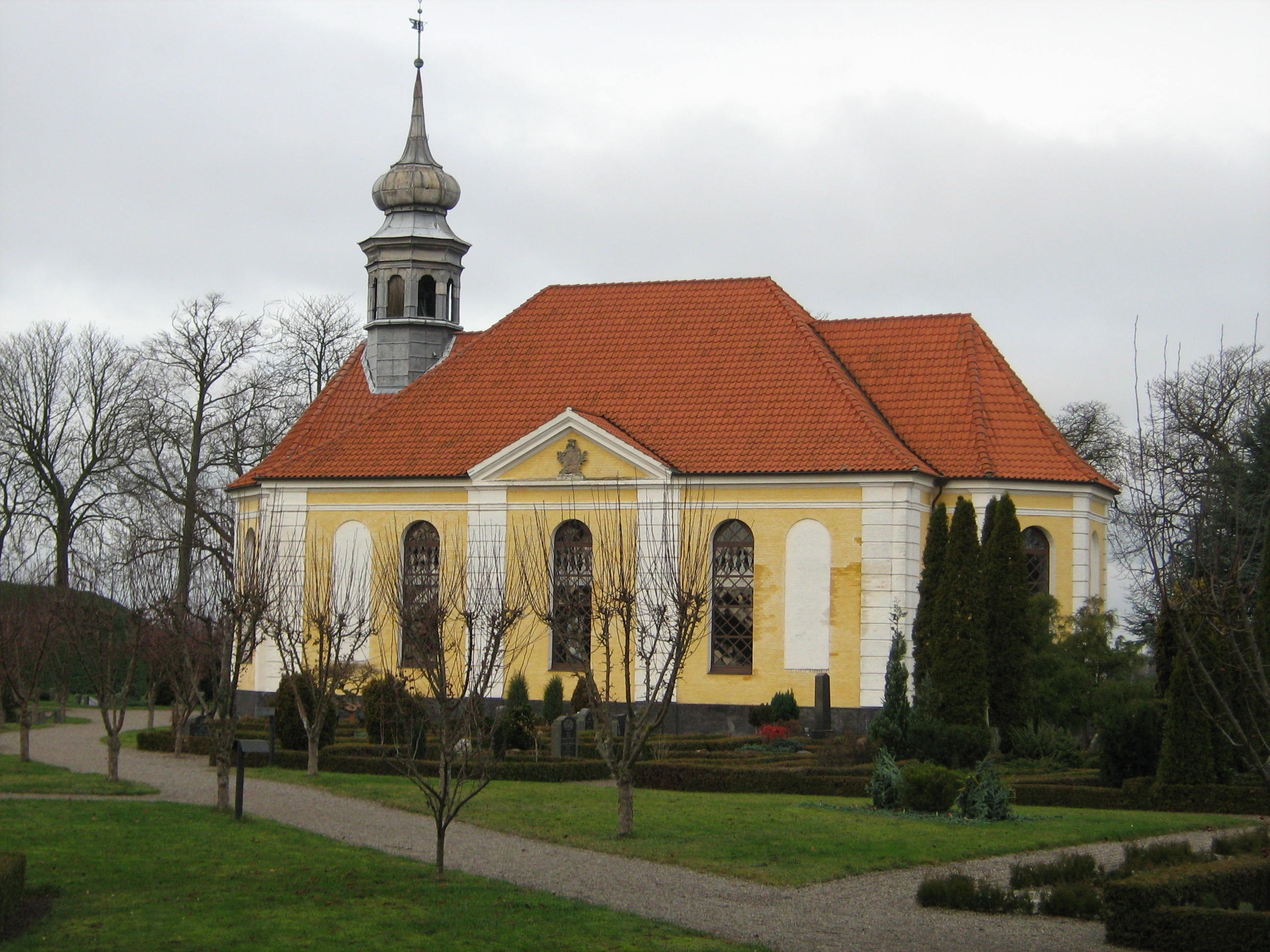
- Damsholte Church

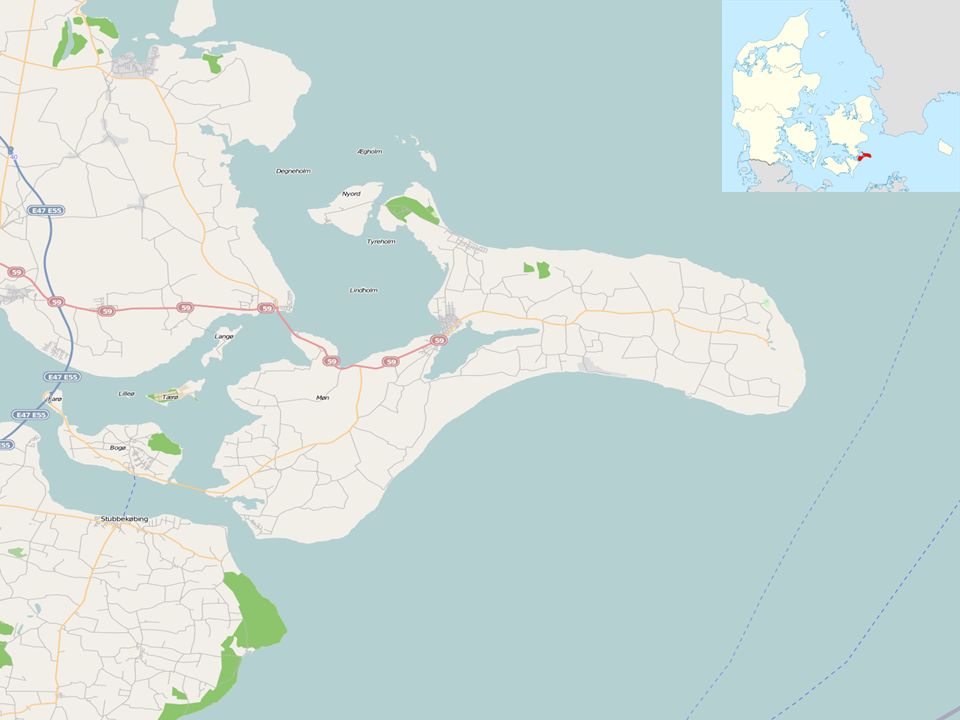
- Location on Møn
- Coordinates: 54°56′22.9″N 12°12′54.3″E
- Country: Denmark
- Region: Region Zealand
- Municipality: Vordingborg Municipality
- Time zone: UTC+1 (CET)
  - Summer (DST): UTC+2 (CEST)

Damsholte is a village on the Danish island of Møn. It is located some 6 km south-west of Stege.

The first reference to Damsholte dates back to 1664.

Damsholte Church, the only Rococo village church in Denmark is to be found in the western part of the village close to the Marienborg Estate.

The village is in Vordingborg Municipality which belongs to Region Sjælland.

== Notable people ==
- Edouard Mielche (1905 in Damsholte – 1969) a Danish film actor
- Elsa Gress (1919 – 1988 in Marienborg Manor) a Danish essayist, novelist and dramatist

== Sources ==
- Trap, J. P.: Danmark. Præstø Amt. Bind IV, 5., 1955.
