= Love Thy Neighbour (1967 film) =

1967 film

- Directed by: Egil Kolstø
- Written by: Willy Breinholst; Egil Kolstø
- Produced by: Henrik Sandberg; Palle Schnedler-Sørensen
- Starring: Walter Giller
- Cinematography: Henning Bendtsen
- Edited by: Edith Nisted Nielsen
- Production companies: Merry Film; Norddeutsche Farbenfilmproduktion
- Distributed by: Nora-Filmverleih
- Release date: 1 September 1967
- Running time: 100 minutes
- Countries: Denmark; West Germany
- Language: Danish

Love Thy Neighbour (Danish: Elsk... din næste!, German: Vergiß nicht deine Frau zu küssen) is a 1967 Danish-German comedy film directed by Egil Kolstø and starring Walter Giller, Ghita Norby and Dirch Passer.

== Cast ==
- Walter Giller as Forfatter Sven Gjeholm
- Ghita Nørby as Britt
- Dirch Passer as Olaf
- Christina Schollin as Solvej
- Carl Ottosen as Peter
- Vivi Bach as Olafs forsvundne kæreste
- Elsa Lystad as Frl. Andresen
- Paul Hagen as Borger i Mårböosen
- Kai Holm as Købmanden
- Axel Strøbye as Hotelejeren
- Ove Sprogøe as Præsten
- Poul Bundgaard as Niels
- Hans W. Petersen as Solvej's far
- Ann Schaufuss as Thea
- Edouard Mielche as Gamle Elias
- William Kisum as Skolelæreren
- Hanne Løye as Skolelærerens kone
- Tove Maës as Borger i Mårböosen
- Basse Nicolaisen as Hotelkarl
- Mogens Brandt as Tjeneren
- Karl Stegger as Postmesteren
