= Sven Havsteen-Mikkelsen =

Danish painter (1912–1999)

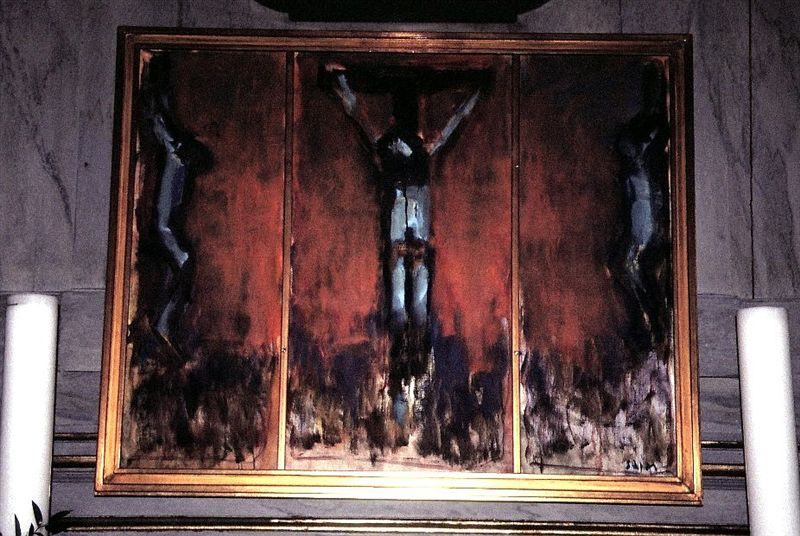
Damsholte Church altarpiece painting of Christ on the cross (1993) by Sven Havsteen-Mikkelsen

Sven Havsteen-Mikkelsen (16 September 1912 – 14 February 1999) was a Danish painter who is remembered for his old Nordic landscapes, his church decorations and his woodcuts.

== Early life and education ==
After his parents, Johan Theodor Havsteen and Ella Holm-Jensen, divorced, Havsteen-Mikkelsen was brought up by the polar explorer Ejnar Mikkelsen. He studied art under Olivian Holm Møller (1929), Fritz Syberg (1929–1932), P. Rostrup Bøyesen (1932–1933) and Oluf Høst (1932–1933). He also spent short periods at the Norwegian Academy under Per Krohg (1933–1934) and at the Danish Academy under Elof Risebye (1942–1943).

== Artistic career ==
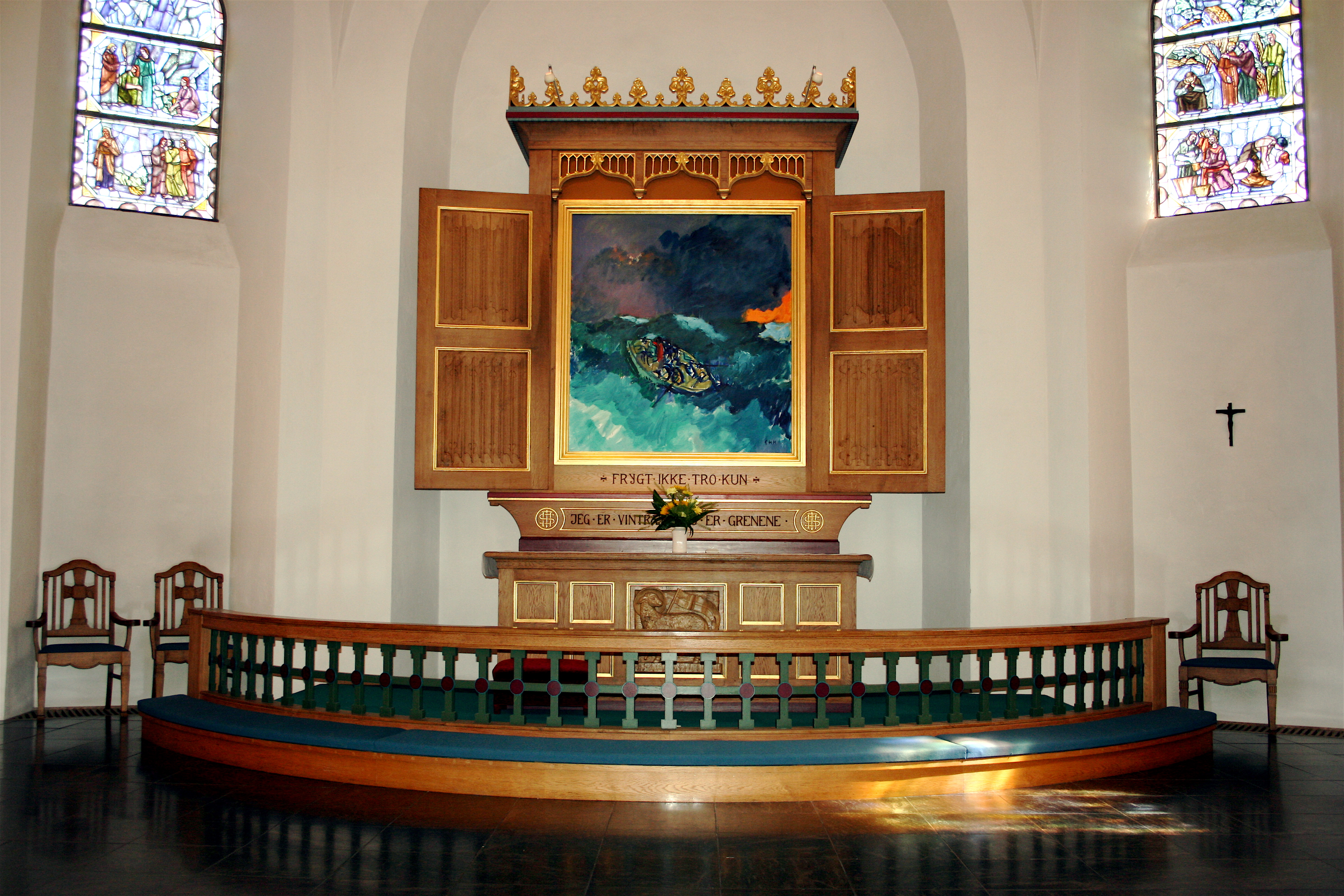
Altar painting (1991) in Rønne Church on Bornholm of Christ calming a storm in a boat together with his disciples

Havsteen-Mikkelsen's art and interests were deeply rooted in the Nordic countries. Under the influence of Ejnar Mikkelsen and thanks to early voyages to the Faroes, Iceland and Greenland, he was confronted while still young with subjects he would maintain throughout his life. He became especially interested in the age-old landscapes of the North, still free of the detrimental effects of civilisation. In his youth, Havsteen-Mikkelsen became acquainted with the Funen Painters where he also learnt the art of woodcut, a technique he would later use to illustrate books on Nordic literature. At the Academy in Oslo, his studies of stave church decoration developed his interest in sacred art.

After travelling widely outside Denmark, Havsteen-Mikkelsen settled first on Tåsinge and later on Ærø from where he toured the Danish countryside with Martin A. Hansen, Ole Wivel and Regin Dahl. From the 1950s, he became a central figure for church decoration in Denmark, completing altarpieces and religious works which often harmonised with existing Renaissance art. His work extended to stained glass windows which he often created with his son, the architect Alan Havsteen-Mikkelsen or with Mogens Frese. His landscapes from the Faroes and Iceland often depict early Christian communities but they are always free of human figures who are only to be found in his Biblical works. Among his landscapes depicting early Nordic cults are Askestorm, Island (1955) and Beinisvörd, Færøerne (1957). His portraits are often inspired by members of his family with 25 paintings of his wife Pam.

He illustrated many of Martin A. Hansen's books including Orm og Tyr (1952) with 400 of his woodcuts and Rejse paa Island (1954). He also illustrated Herman Melville's Moby Dick (1955). His illustrations are frequently based on very early Danish sacred art, both heathen and Christian. Another aspect of his illustrative work was postage stamp design. Together with his son Alan, he was the originator of an annual series of four or five stamps depicting different parts of Denmark (1974–1981). He also participated in earlier series (1970–1973) covering ships, architecture and frescos.

Havsteen-Mikkelsen received many awards for his work including the Eckersberg Medal in 1960 and the Thorvaldsen Medal in 1995.

== Church decorations and furnishings ==
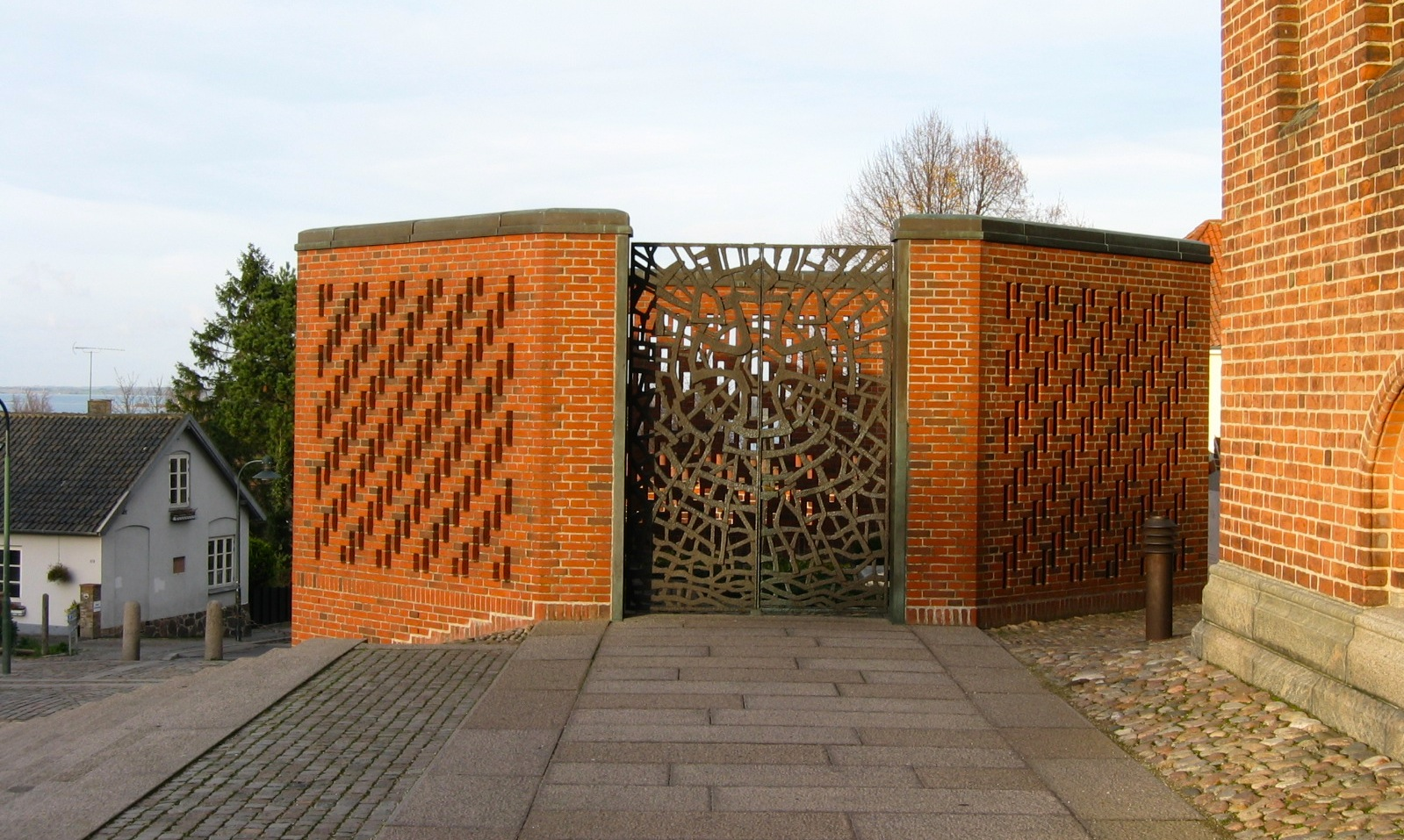
Bronze gates (1985) to Frederik IX's Mausoleum, Roskilde

Of particular note is the decorative work Havsteen-Mikkelsen completed in some 60 churches in Denmark, Norway, Greenland and the Faroes comprising altarpieces, paintings, stained glass windows and crucifixes. Favourite subjects include Christ calming the storm on the Sea of Galilee, Christ's Crucifixion, and Christ's appearance in Emmaus.

In 1985, Havsteen-Mikkelsen designed the bronze gates to Frederik IX's Mausoleum adjacent to Roskilde Cathedral.

== Permanent exhibitions ==
A permanent exhibition of Havsteen-Mikkelsen's work can be seen at Schæffergården in Jægersborg to the north of Copenhagen.

Søbygaard on the island of Ærø houses an exhibition of the preparatory sketches Havsteen-Mikkelsen made for his stained glass windows while Ærø Museum has a large collection of his portrait sketches, lithographs, illustrations and postage stamp works.
