= Edouard Mielche =

Danish actor (1905–1969)

- Born: 8 August 1905; Damsholte, Denmark
- Died: 18 February 1969 (aged 63); Denmark
- Occupation: Actor
- Years active: 1928–1969

Edouard Mielche (8 August 1905 – 18 February 1969) was a Danish film actor. He appeared in 17 films between 1928 and 1969. He was born in Damsholte, Denmark and died in Denmark.

== Selected filmography ==
- Filmens helte (1928)
- Pas paa pigerne (1930)
- Paustians Uhr (1932)
- Elverhøj (1939)
- Affæren Birte (1945)
- Mani (1947)
- Røverne fra Rold (1947)
- Kristinus Bergman (1948)
- Han, Hun, Dirch og Dario (1962)
- Bureauslaven (1964)
- Premiere i helvede (1964)
- Gertrud (1964)
- Min søsters børn (1966)
- Der var engang (1966)
- Elsk... din næste! (1967)
- Woyzeck (1968)
- Farlig sommer (1969)
