= Allerslev Church =

Coordinates: 55°04′52″N 12°02′15″E

- Allerslev Kirke
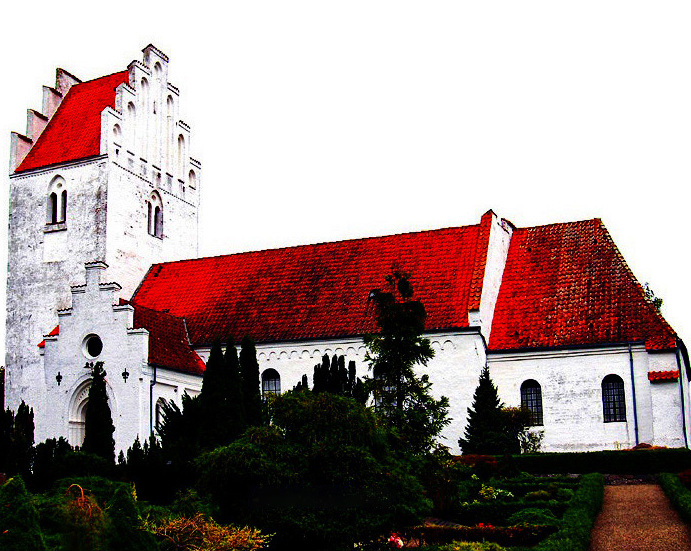
- Allerslev Church
- Location: Allerslev, Vordingborg Municipality
- Country: Denmark
- Denomination: Church of Denmark

Architecture
- Style: Romanesque architecture, Gothic architecture
- Years built: 12th century

Administration
- Diocese: Diocese of Roskilde
- Deanery: Stege-Vordingborg Provsti
- Parish: Allerslev Sogn

Allerslev Church (Danish: Allerslev Kirke) is a Church of Denmark parish church in the village of Allerslev, Vordingborg Municipality, Denmark.

== History ==
The church dates from the first half of the 12th century, when part of the nave and chancel were built. During the Reformation, Allerslev Church was confiscated by the Crown.The church was later presented to Sidsel Grubbe by Christian V. The church was later owned by Christen Fransen Toxværg (1673–1728). In the 1750s, it belonged to one kammerassessor Bruun. By 1654, it had come under Jungshoved Manor. By 1803, it belonged to Engelholm. Later in the century, it was transferred to Oremandsgaard. In 1861, Alfred Hage bought the estate. On 19 September 1914, Allerslev Church gained its independence as a self-owning institution.

== Architecture ==
The oldest part of the church was constructed in limestone ashlars from Stevns Klint. The nave was later extended westwards in the Late Romanesque period. The tower was constructed in large brick (so-called munkesten) in the Late Gothic style.The present porch was constructed for Alfred Hage in the second half of the 19th century. He also constructed a chapel in the grounds.

== Firnishings ==
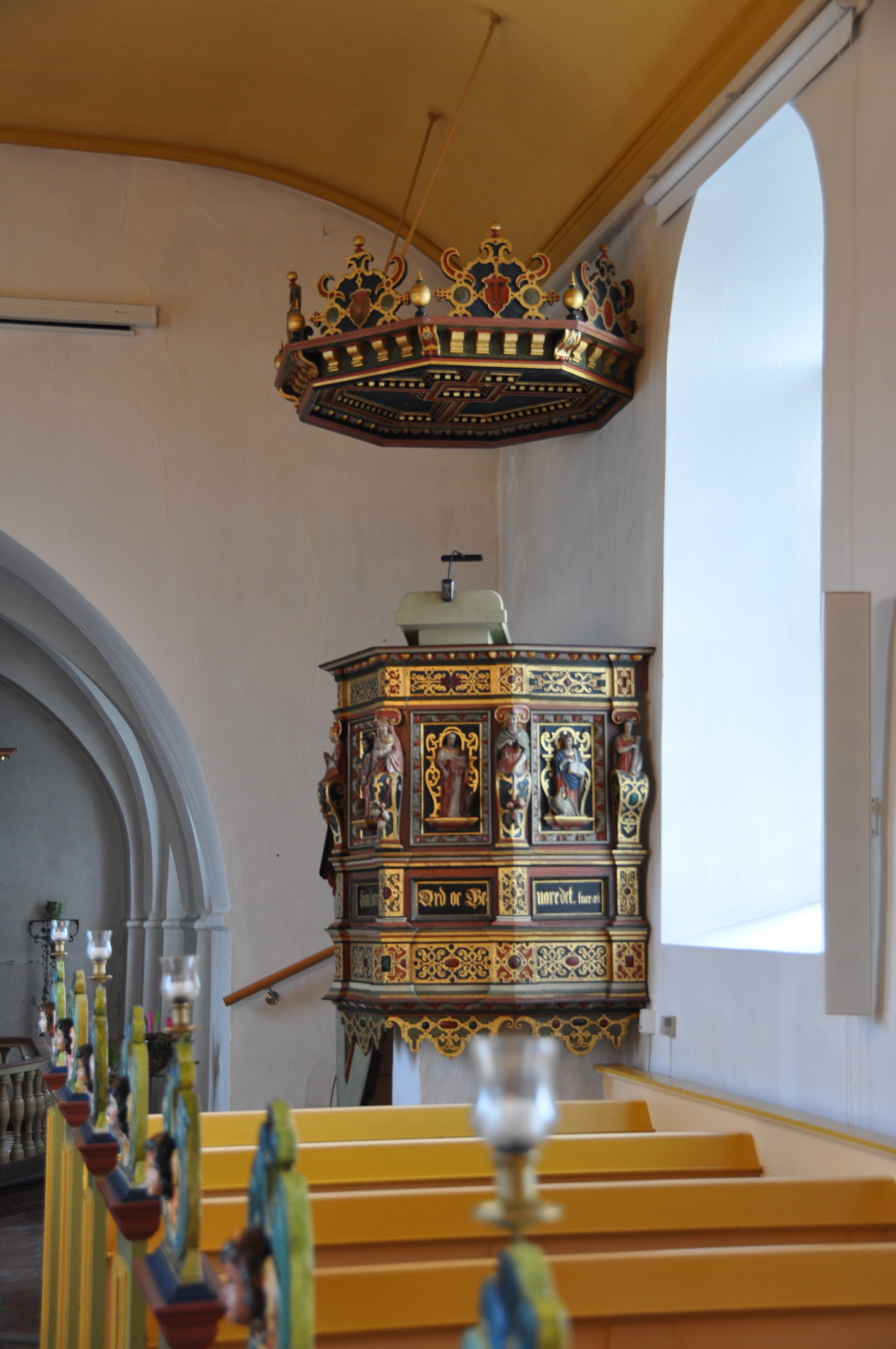
The pulpit

The altarpiece is from 1590. It features the coats of arms of Denmark and Mecklenburg. The latter is a reference to Sophia of Mecklenburg. The pulpit was created by Albert Schrøder's workshop in 1710.

== Churchyard ==
The churchyard is surrounded by a white-grouted wall. The northeastern part of the wall is designed in the Late Gothic style. The south wall is younger. Notable burials include:

- Marie Grubbe, noblewoman
