= Liselund =

18th-century park on the Danish island of Møn

Coordinates: 55°00′01″N 12°31′18″E

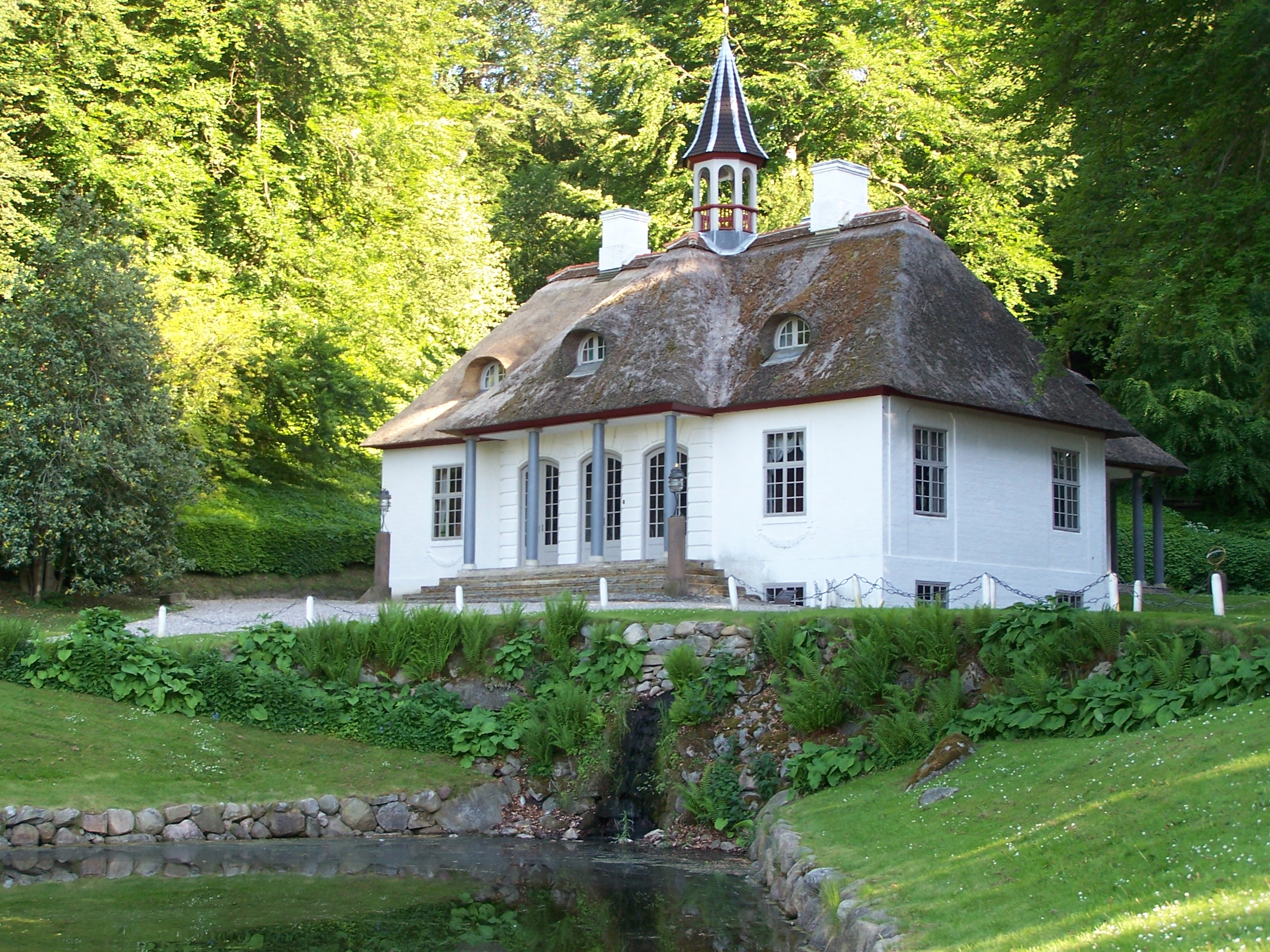
Summer manor at Liselund

Liselund is an 18th-century aesthetically landscaped park, complete with several exotic buildings and monuments. Situated near Møns Klint on the north-eastern corner of the Danish island of Møn, it is deemed to be one of the finest examples in Scandinavia of Romantic English gardening. The park was created in the 1790s by French nobleman Antoine de Bosc de la Calmette for his wife Elisabeth, commonly known as Lisa. Liselund, roughly translated, means Lise's grove.

== Background ==
=== Arrival of the De la Calmette family in Denmark ===
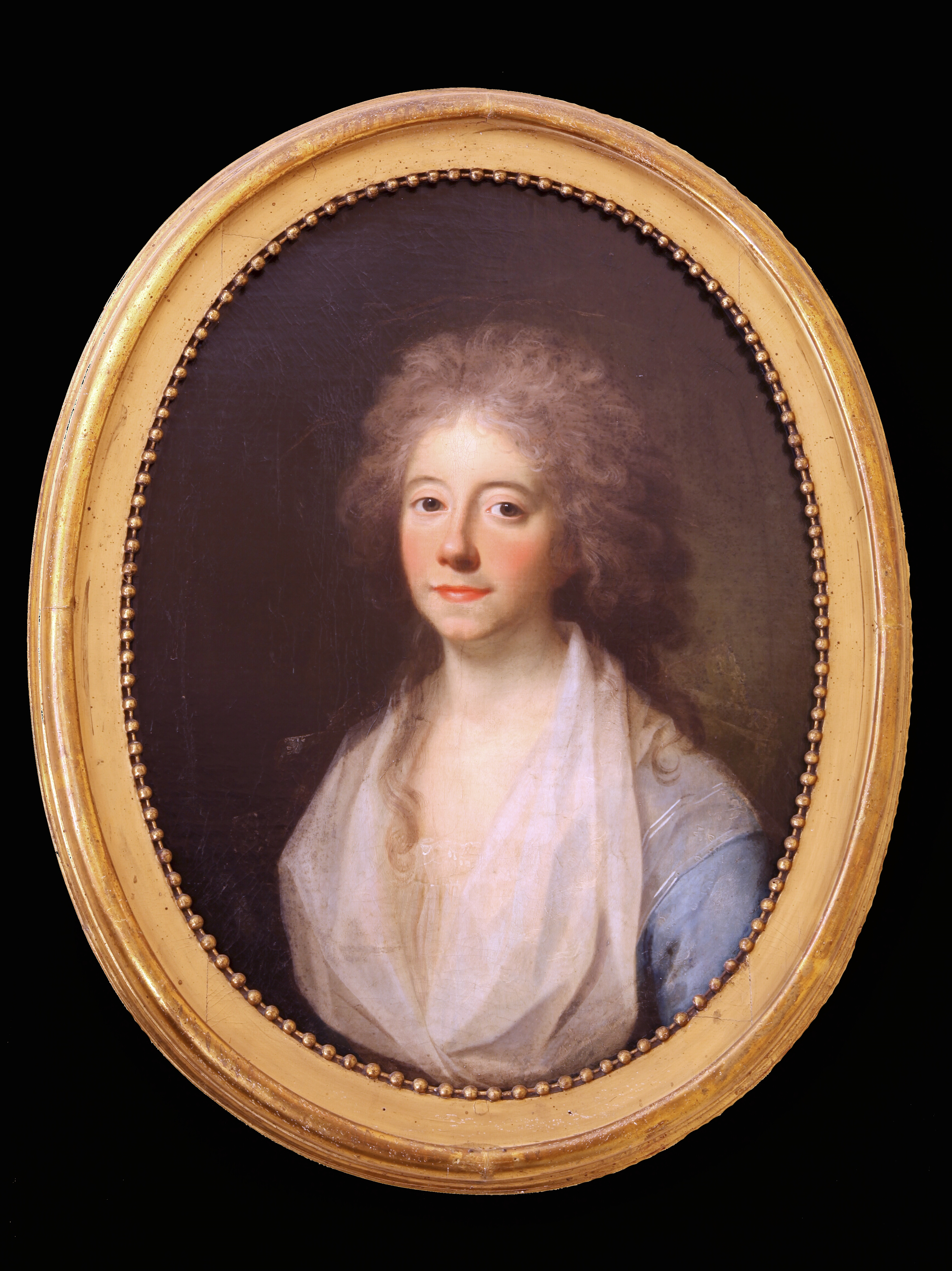
Lisa de la Calmette

Antoine de Bosc de la Calmette was a Huguenot whose family had been compelled to move from France to Holland. His father was a diplomat who after terms in Switzerland and Portugal, finally arrived in Denmark where, in 1776, the family was naturalised and recognised as Danish nobility.

In January 1777, he married Catharina Elisabeth Iselin, the daughter of the Swiss baron Reinhard Iselin who had also emigrated to Denmark. In 1783, Antoine was appointed prefect of Møn. The same year, he bought six hectares of land on the eastern coast of the island in the parish of Magleby.

=== Origin of the park ===
Plan of the garden from 1691,

He and his wife, who travelled widely, had become interested in Jean-Jacques Rousseau's philosophy of naturalism in the Age of Enlightenment. As a result, Antoine designed the park in the Romantic spirit of the time as a loving gift for his wife. It was intended as a retreat where the family could spend a few days or weeks at a time, often with invited guests, away from the hardships of their working lives at Marienborg on the other side of the island.

=== History of the estate ===
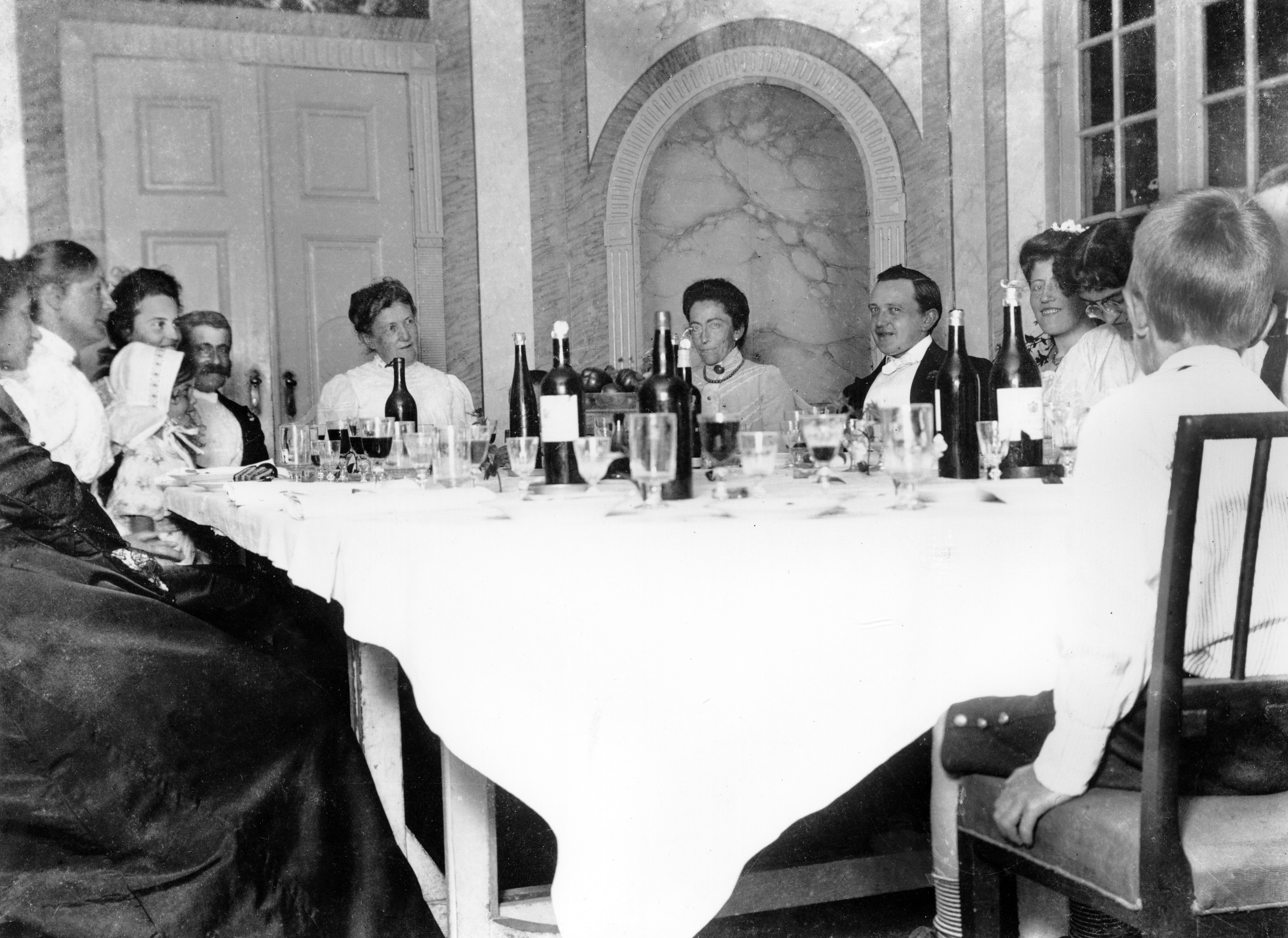
Dinner at Liselund, c. 1905.

Antoine and Lisa were not able to enjoy the park for very long. He died in 1803 and his wife in 1805. Their son, Charles, then took over Liselund but, after his death in 1821, it was sold to a friend, Frederik Raben-Levetzau-Huitfeldt, who died in 1828, and his wife, Emerentia Rosenkrantz-Huitfeldt, who died in 1843. The estate was then inherited by her nephew, Baron Gottlob Rosenkranz until 1884 when it was bought by his son Baron Fritz Rosenkranz. In 1936, it was transferred to his eldest son, Baron Erik Rosenkranz, then to Erik's brother, Niels, in 1956. In 1973, it was transferred to Baron Niels Henrik Rosenkranz until, owing to the increasing costs of maintaining the estate, the summer manor and park became the property of the Danish State to be administered by the National Museum of Denmark.

== The park ==
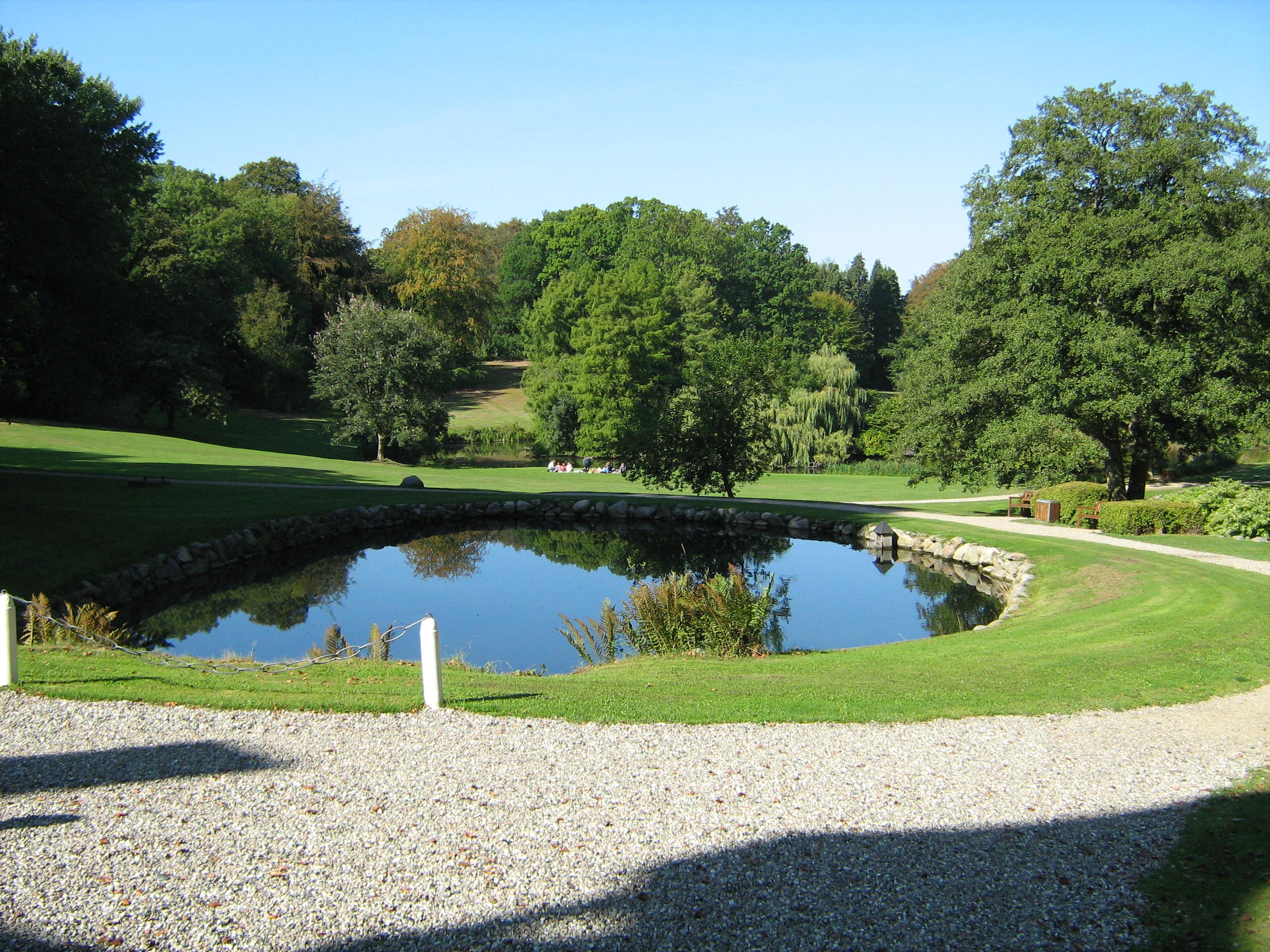
Park from the south

The area of land Antoine de la Calmette bought in 1783 was partly marshy, partly wooded. It bore no resemblance to the park which can be seen today, however natural it may now seem.

The ground first had to be drained, cleared and levelled. Then, in accordance with contemporary standards, it was landscaped and planted with a range of trees, some quite rare, including oaks, sweet chestnuts, walnuts, mulberry, spruce and cypress. The park was designed to be poetic with the gentle undulations of its terrain and its many lakes. Indeed, water was a key element of any Romantic garden.

But it also had contrasts, for example the sheer Devil's Ravine with its Devil's Bridge where, in rainy weather, water from the lakes cascades down to the sea. Today the park provides a quite unexpected experience for those who enter through the chestnut-bordered avenue leading into the park from the main road to the west.

== The old manor house ==
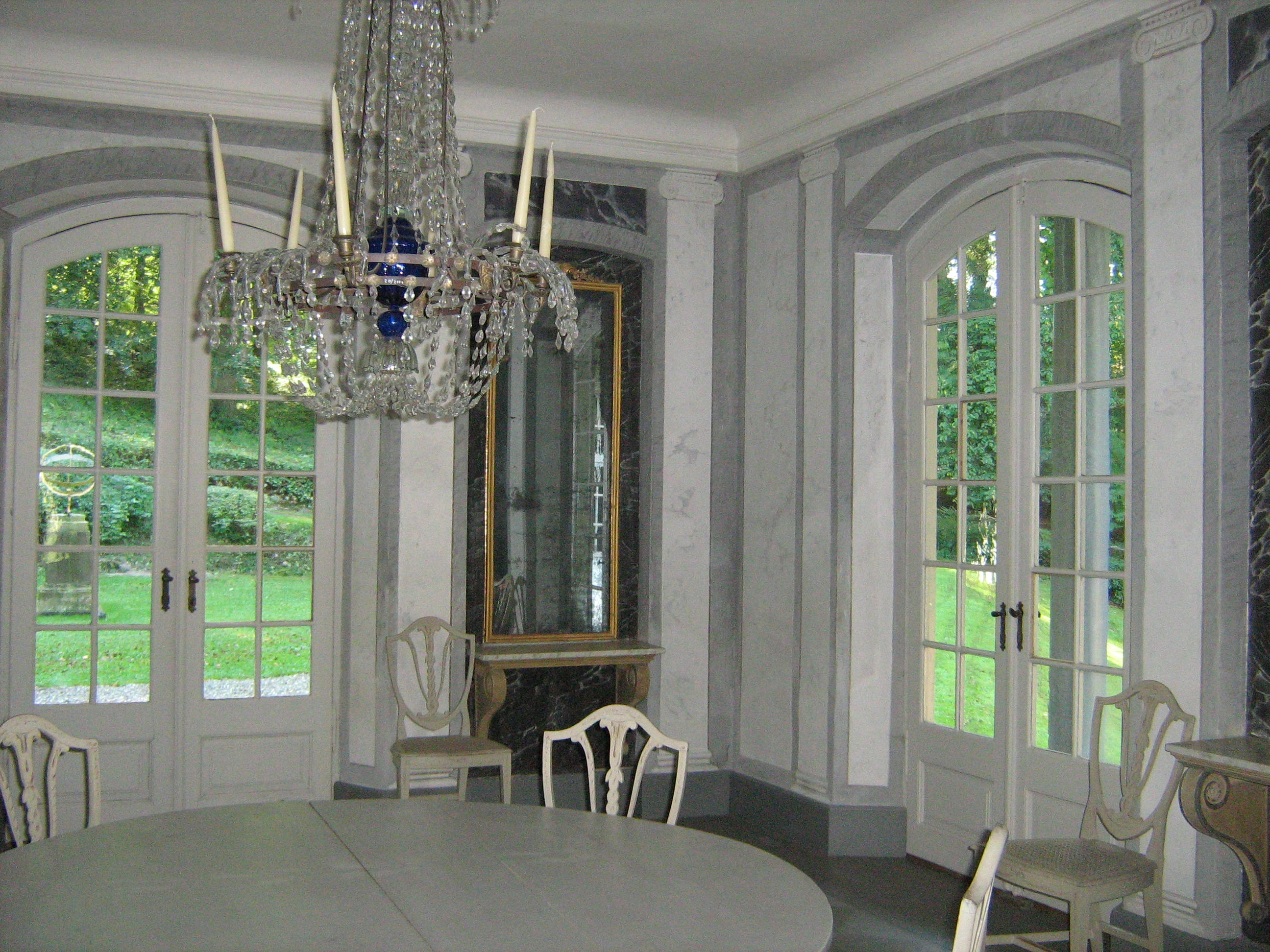
Liselund: dining hall

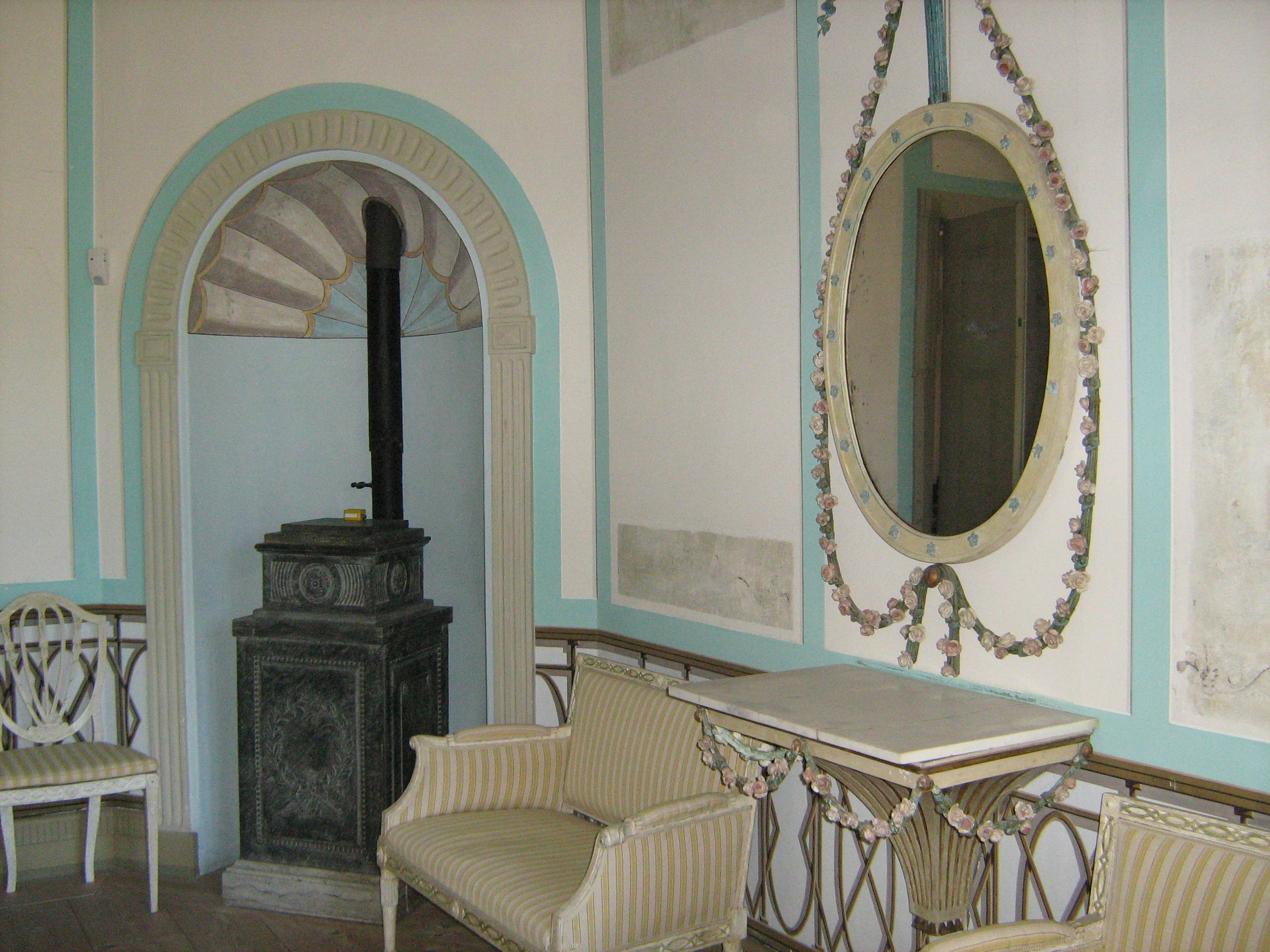
Liselund:corner of the entree

Liselund Gammel Slot, literally Liselund Old Manor, is a rather small country home built in the French neoclassical style. It is exceptional in that it has a thatched roof. Like the park itself, the house was designed by Andreas Kirkerup, one of the foremost landscape architects of the times. It lies against the slope of the eastern hill, beside a small pond, and overlooks the park to the north.

The building is T-shaped with the main rooms on the ground floor, the first floor consisting of nine bedrooms. The interior was probably decorated and furnished by the leading decorator of the day, Joseph Christian Lillie. Many of the wall decorations and some of the furniture date back to the original design. Among the most impressive rooms are the Entrée, an airy room opening onto the garden, the spacious Dining Hall, the Ghost Room which was Lisa's boudoir, and the Monkey Room with its monkey mirror. The monkey at the top of the bamboo-frame mirror may well be in remembrance of a pet monkey who helped save the family during the Lisbon earthquake in 1755.

Other rooms include the Family Room with several portraits, the Calmette Parlour and the Lady's Chamber, one of the larger bedrooms.

While the gardens are open throughout the year, the thatched manor is open to the public with guided visits during the summer months only.

== Other exotic buildings ==
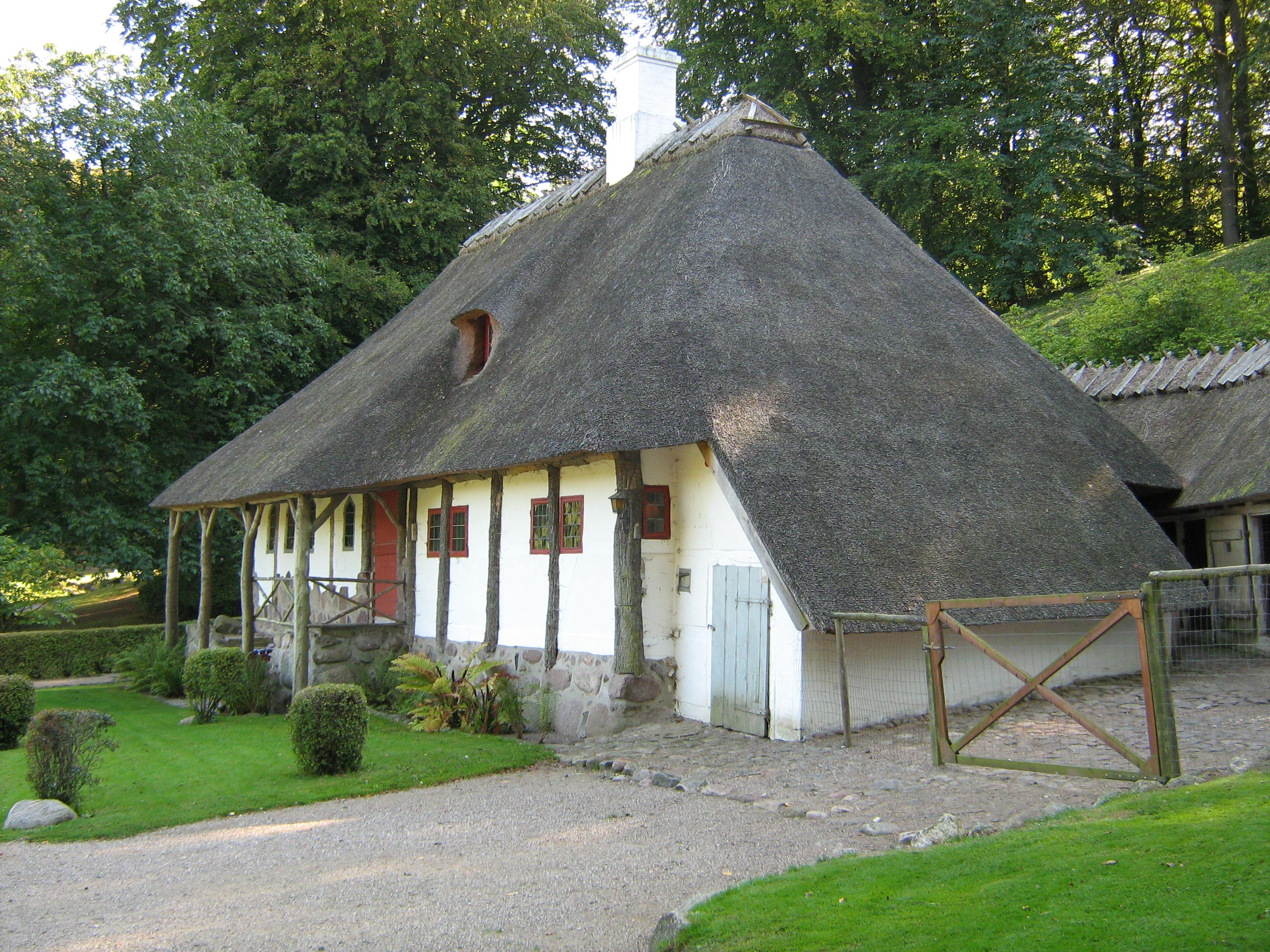
Schweizerhytten

In the style of the times and in order to provide a more relaxing atmosphere, several foreign-looking buildings were spread around the park, each with its own character and designed to fit a particular need.

=== The Swiss House ===
The Swiss House or Schweiserhytten was built at the foot of a bronze-age tumulus close to the manor house on the verge of the entrance drive. It was originally the home of the gardener but it had some beautifully decorated rooms under its thatched roof where guests could stay.

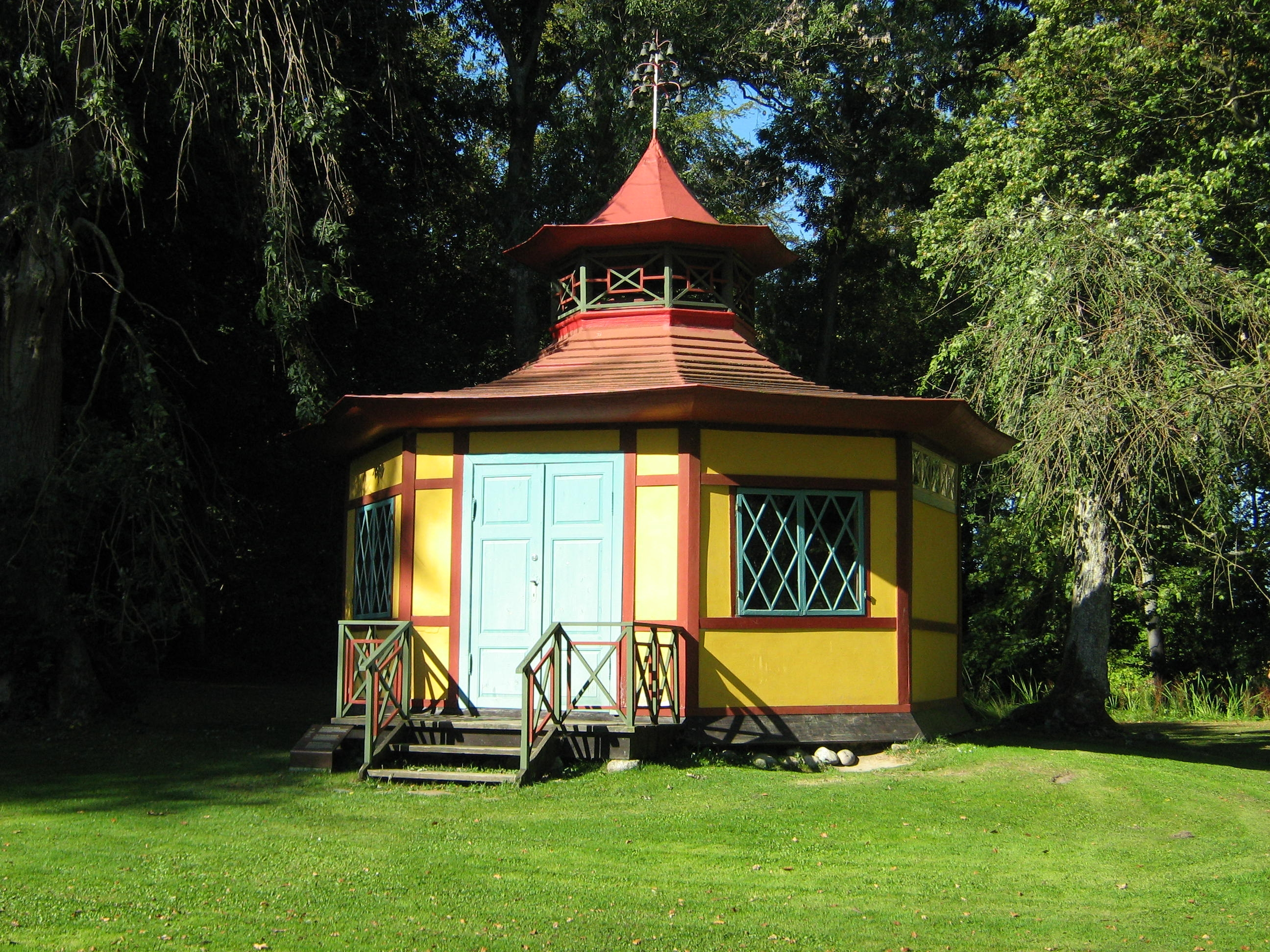
Chinese Summerhouse

=== The Chinese Summerhouse ===
The Chinese Summerhouse or Det kinesiske lysthus stands on top of the western hill and looks down over the lakes towards the sea. The weeping ash to the left adds to the Chinese flavour of the site. It was quite usual to include Chinese pagodas in romantically styled gardens. No doubt guests could be taken there for a short walk and a cup of Chinese tea.

=== The Norwegian House ===
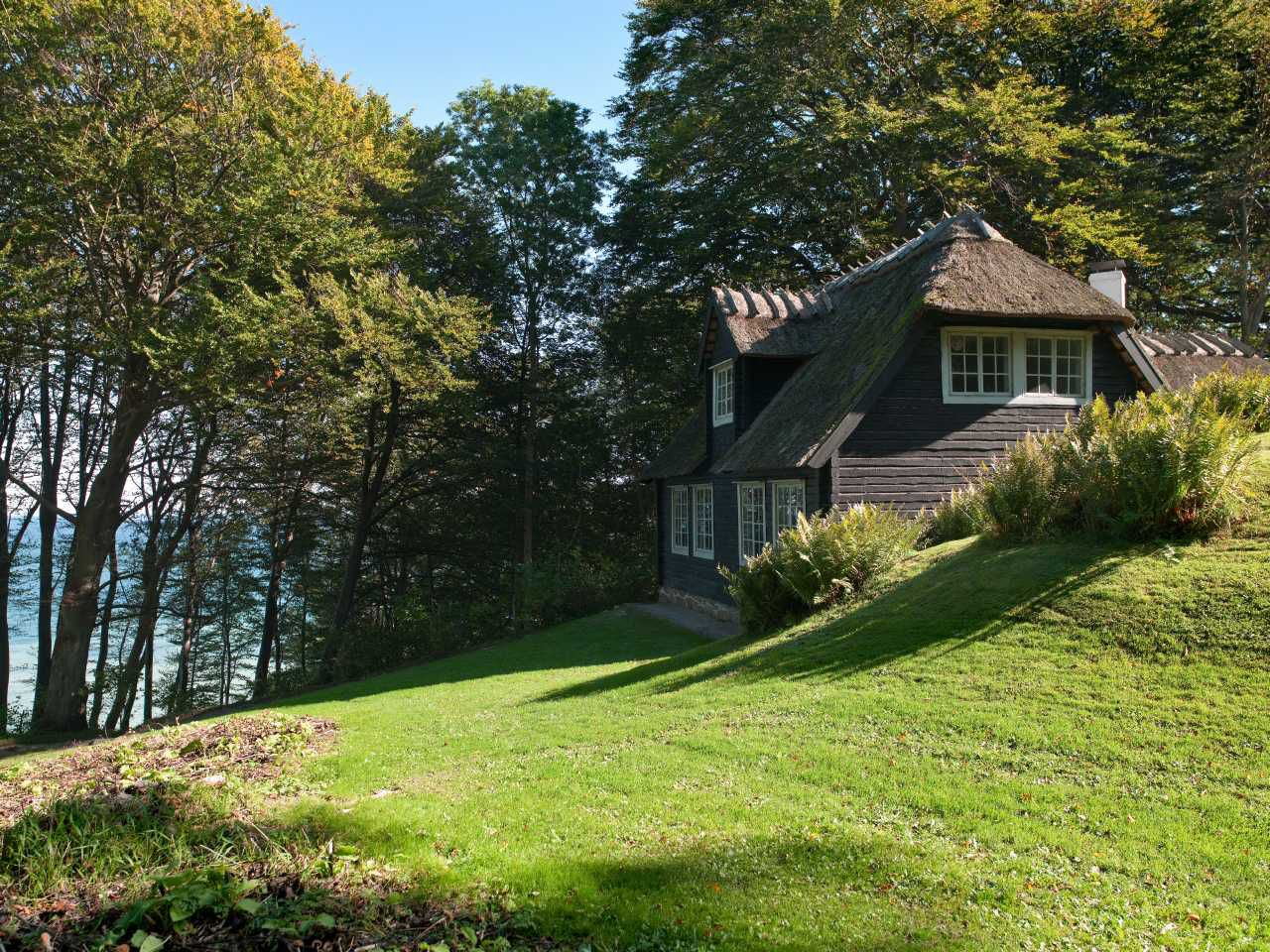
The Norwegian House

The Norwegian House or Det norske hus was built close to the cliffs in a rugged, hilly area, which seen through Danish eyes would resemble a Norwegian landscape. Its only Norwegian elements, however, are the sham logs intended to make it look like a typical log building. They are just rounded planks nailed to the constructive timber-framed walls. The steep thatched roof is a purely Danish feature. A typical Norwegian house would have a more gently sloping sod roof.

The guest rooms inside are quite different with a Chinese and a Pompeian room. One notable feature is the small yellow glass opening in the shutters which gave the impression of moonlight however brightly the sun might be shining outside.

== The New Manor ==
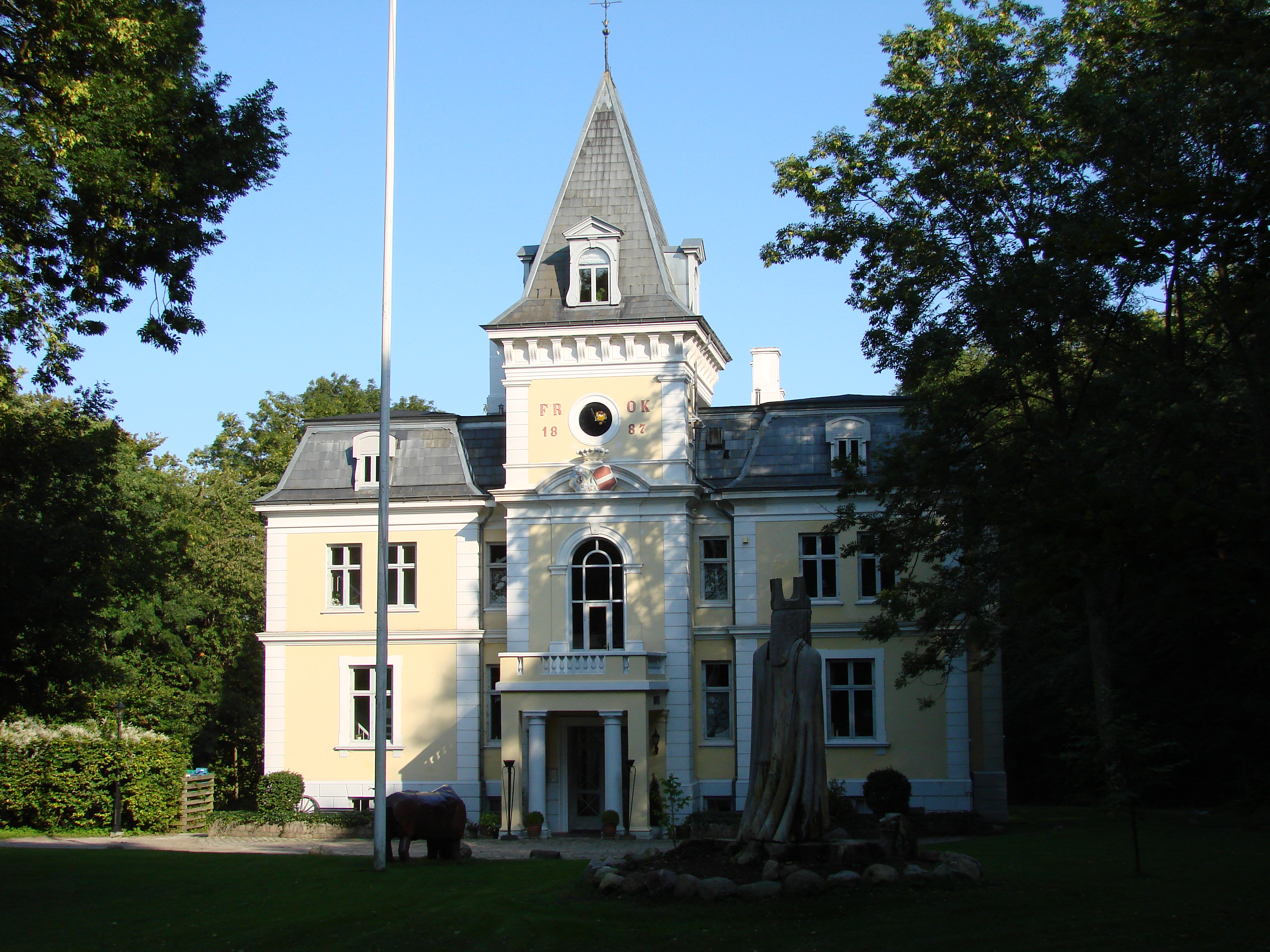
Liselund Ny Slot

Liselund Ny Slot, literally Liselund New Manor, was built in 1887 by Baron Fritz Rosenkrantz whose father, Gottlob, had inherited the estate in 1843. It stands majestically at the top of the western slope, overlooking the largest of the park's lakes and the sea beyond.

Built in the Italian style and decorated with fine ceiling frescos, stucco and wall panels, the New Manor was used by the Rosenkranz family until the 1960s. It was sold to the State in 1980 but lay empty for many years until it was bought by Krista and Steffen Steffensen in 1989 who converted it into an attractive hotel. In June 2025, the New Manor was sold to Frederik Nørgaard, a Dane who has spent the past 30 years in San Francisco. He hopes to make the hotel and especially the restaurant more accessible to visitors.

== Ornamental monuments ==
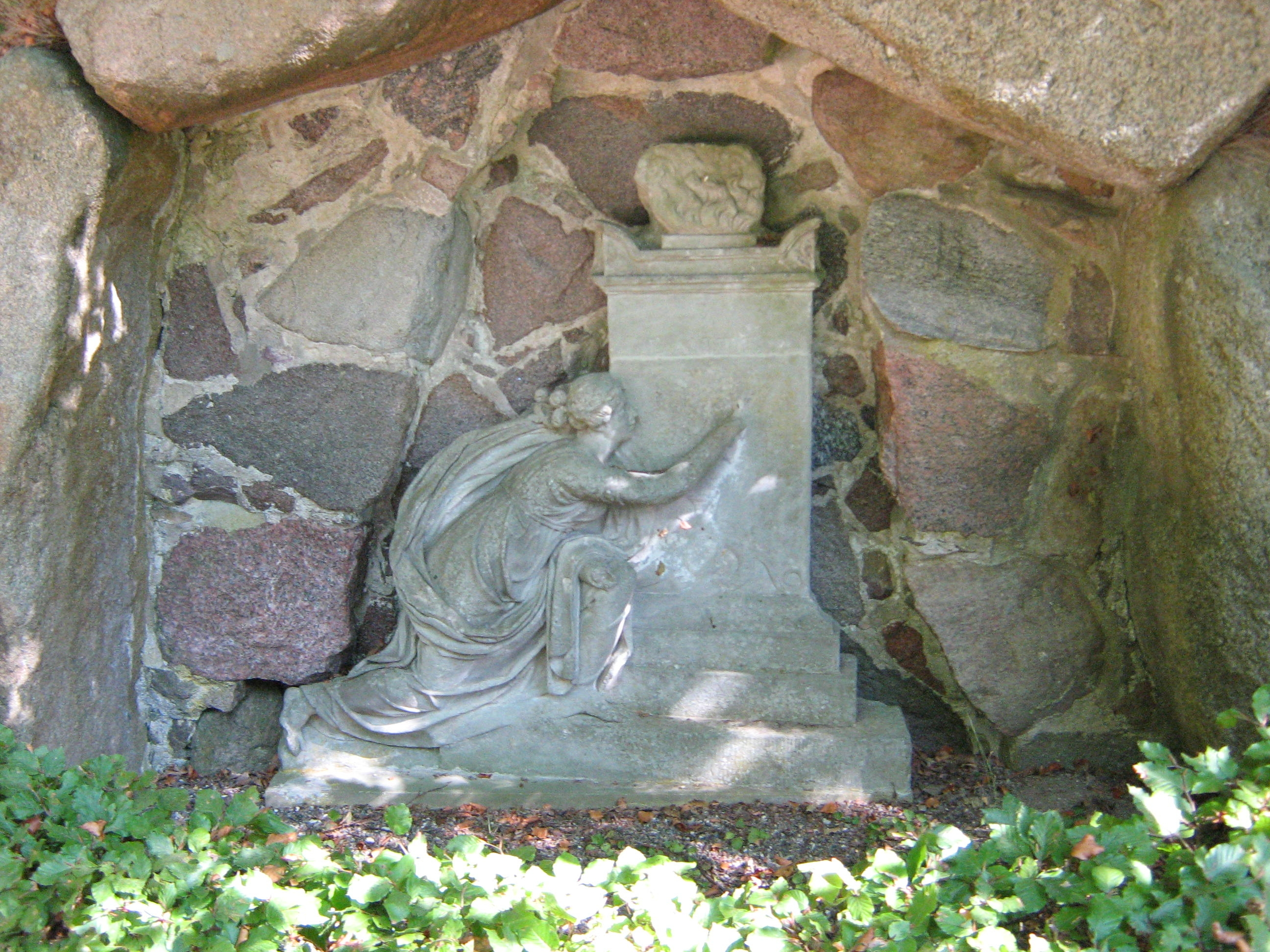
Monument to L'Amitié

The parks contains a number of ornamental monuments, most concerned with love and friendship. The path leading down towards the manor house from the south passes a monument dedicated to L'Amitié or Friendship. Known as Shrivemonumentet, it was a gift from Lisa to her husband during the 1780s. It bears the inscription "A l'amitié pure" (To pure friendship). Another monument close to the stream down to the cliffs is labelled Endroit chéri de Lise (Lise's favourite spot).

== The Hans Christian Andersen connection ==
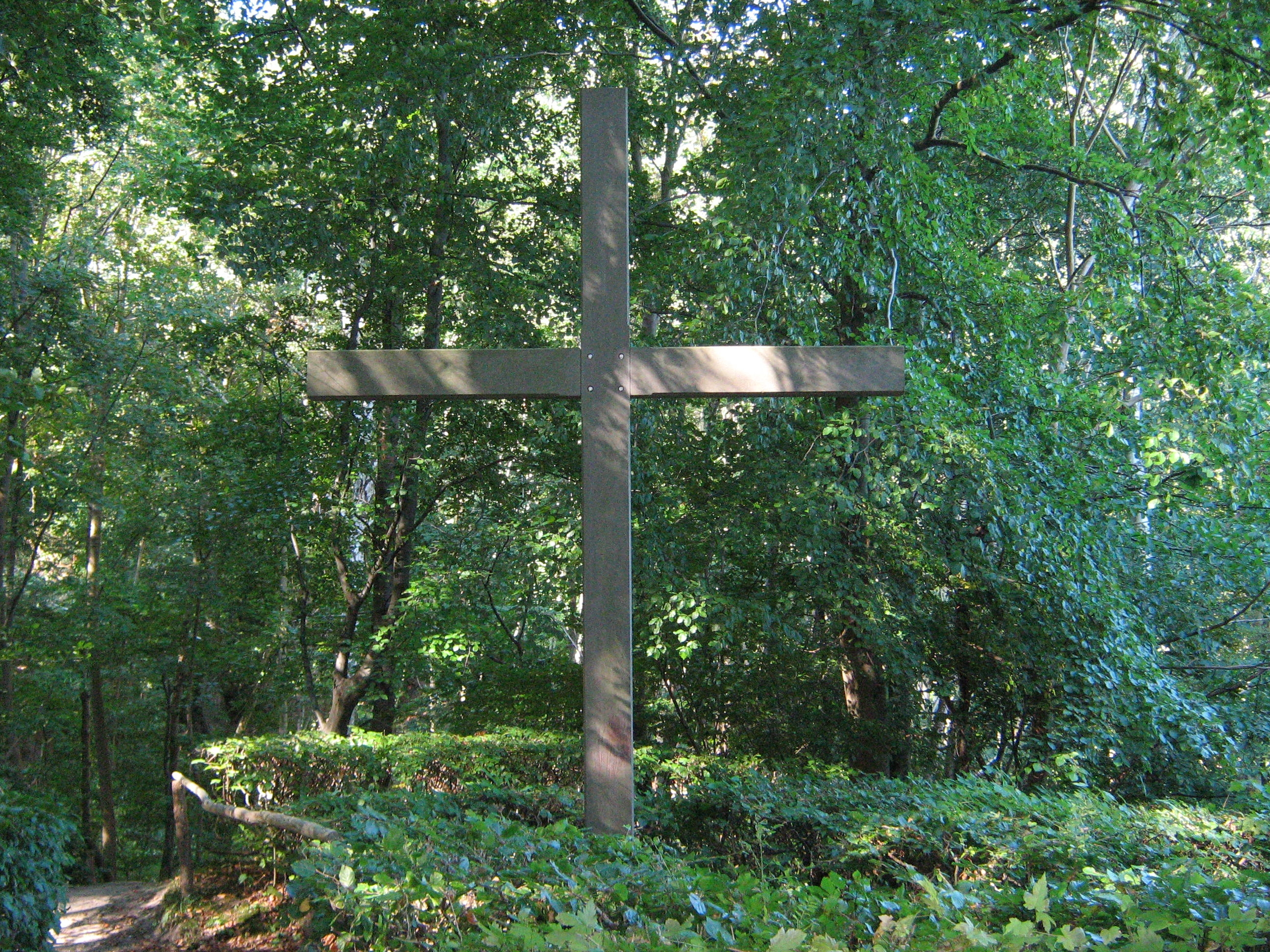
The wooden cross

The park has had many well-known visitors, particularly during the period when Martha de la Calmette, Antoine's daughter-in-law, lived there as a widow for 57 years until her death in 1877. They included the Danish Romantic poet, Adam Gottlob Oehlenschläger and the sculptor, Bertel Thorvaldsen, but the most famous of all was Hans Christian Andersen who visited the park in the summer of 1829 when he was only 24 and found it delightful.

Liselund must have made a deep impression on Andersen as his poem Klintekorset paa Møen or Møn's Cliff Cross was inspired by a large wooden cross at the edge of the cliff. The original cross fell into the sea in a landslide in 1905, but a new cross stands close by today. It is also believed that the large hollow willow beside the Swiss House could have inspired him to write story of The Tinderbox.

== Liselund in World War II ==
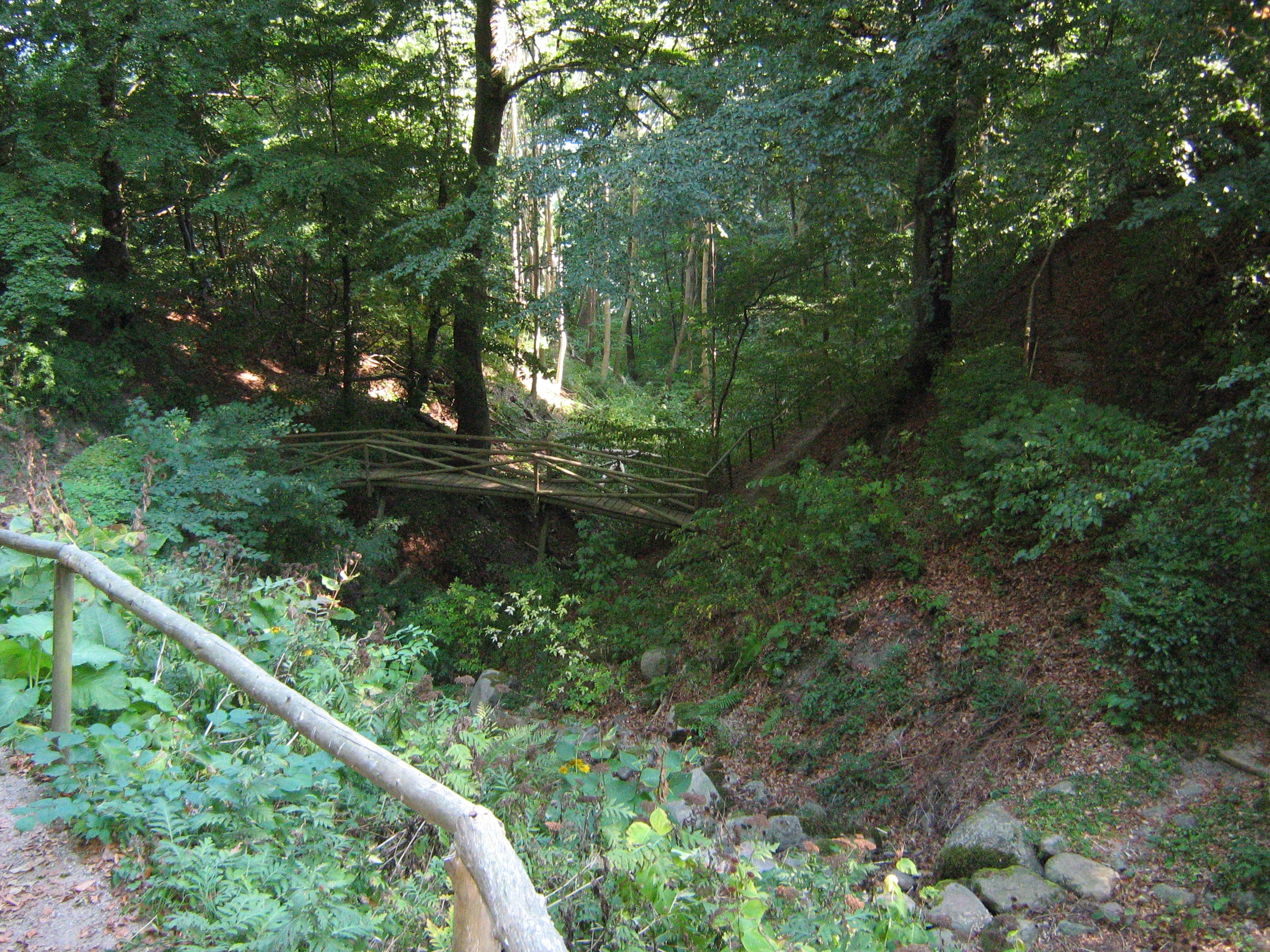
Treacherous steps down Devil's Ravine

Baron Niels Rosenkranz who lived in the estate during World War II was head of the West Møn Danish resistance group, perhaps the first in Denmark as it was set up just a week after the German occupation on 9 April 1940. Towards the end of 1942, the group began to rescue Jews living in Denmark and help them escape to neutral Sweden. Activity was stepped up in October 1943 when the Germans began systematically to round up all Danish Jews.

In the dark of night, small groups of darkly-clad Jews were led down the treacherous paths from Liselund Park to the beach below where they boarded small boats which would take them to Sweden. Although the Gestapo suspected Liselund was being used as an escape route, they did not manage to find any evidence when they arrived on the night of 10 October 1943. The resistance group had heard they were coming and made sure no Jews could be found.

Niels Rosenkranz was also a key member of the group who organised the rescue of 351 ex-inmates of the Stutthof concentration camp who arrived in a river barge at nearby Klintholm Havn on 5 May 1945, the day Denmark was liberated from the Germans.

== List of owners ==
- ( -1769) The Crown
- (1769-1783) Mathias Schmit
- (1783-1803) Gérard Pierre Antoine de Bosc de la Calmette
- (1803-1820)Charles Reinhold Bosc de la Calmette
- (1820-1821) Estate of Charles Reinhold Bosc de la Calmette
- (1821-1828) Frederik Raben-Levetzau-Huitfeldt
- (1828-1843) Charlotta Emmerentia Rosenkrantz-Huitfeldt, gift Raben-Levetzau-Huitfeldt
- (1843-1884) Gottlob E. Rosenkrantz
- (1884-1886) Louise Rosenkrantz
- (1886-1920) Fritz J.V.C. Rosenkrantz
- (1920-1956) Erik Rosenkrantz
- (1956-1970) Niels Oluf Fritz Hermann Rosenkrantz
- (1970-) Niels-Henrik Rosenkrantz (efter 2005 kun Liselund Gods)
- (1980-1989) Staten (Liselund Ny Slot)
- (1989-) Krista Steffensen and Steffen Steffensen (Liselund Ny Slot)
- (2005-)Nationalmuseet (Liselund Gammel Slot)
- (-)Liselund Co Aps v. Niels Iver Rosenkrantz (Liselund Gods)
