= Marienborg Manor =

Estate on the Danish island of Møn

Coordinates: 54.940°N 12.209°E

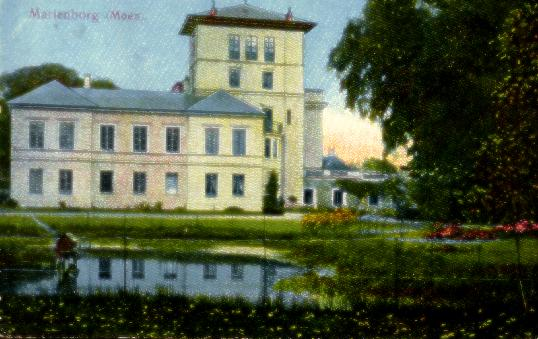

Marienborg Manor is an estate on the Danish island of Møn. The estate has a large park with public access. The main building was demolished in 1984. The estate, covering 1,394 ha (3,440 acres), contains the thatched tenant farm of Egeløkke. Manorial records exist from 1769, though earlier records may exist in the Møn Cavalry District records.

== History ==
=== Nygaard ===
In 1668, Frederik III gave Captain Jacob Nielsen several estates on Møn, including the Nygård farm, as a reward for his having captured a Swedish ship and brought it back to Copenhagen with its cargo and Danish prisoners of war. Nielsen apparently only kept it for a short period. Later, a manor was built there as the residence of Samuel Christoph von Plessen, who in 1685 was appointed governor of Møn. Plessen used bricks from Stege's town wall for the building. When he was relieved of his position of governor in 1697, the house was totally or partially demolished. Casper Gottlob Moltke, who was governor from 1703 to 1728, tidied up the estate and built a new manor house in 1707. In 1739–47, Count Adam Gottlob Moltke resided on the estate but handed it over to the new governor, Frederik Christian von Møsting, against a payment of 6,000 rigsdaler for the building. In 1769, von Møsting transferred the estate to the Crown in return for compensation for the building.

=== Marienborg, 1769–1888 ===
When the Crown sold the property in 1769, it was bought by local farmers but as they were unable to afford the full payment, Regimental Quartermaster Esaias Fleischer from Næstved, together with Magnus Bering Beringskjold, bought it instead. Shortly afterwards, Beringskjold took the property over himself, naming it Marienborg after his wife Marie Kirstine von Cappelen. Being unable to make a payment, in 1776, Beringskjold sold the estate in turn to Charles François de Bosc de la Calmette, whose son Antoine de Bosc de la Calmette, remembered for the romantic English landscape garden he laid out at Liselund on Møn, took it over after the father's death in 1781, calling the manor Calmettenborg.

On Antoine's death in 1781, his son Charles Bosc de la Calmette inherited the estate. Upon his death in 1821, Marienborg Manor was sold to Peter Adolph Tutein. He also bought Kostervig. In 1853–1855, he constructed a new building with a tower in the style of an Italian palace to a design by architect Vilhelm Theodor Walther;

=== Moltke family, 1888–present ===
in 1888, the estate was bought by Hemming Moltke, who in 1893 demolished the old main building from Casper Moltke's time and built instead a new building with a tower designed by architect Axel Berg. A fire destroyed several of the estates buildings in 1908. Moltke's widow Clara Moltke left the estate in 1948 to her grandson P. C. F. G. Moltke.

== Marienborg today ==
Marienborg now consists of a farming and forestry estate in West Møn, specializing in pig rearing. Of a total of 1,392 ha, 370 ha are forest. The estate consists of Marienborg, Egelykke, Frøhave, Skovridergaarden and Lille Lind. It covers countryside which includes woods, pastures, fields and hedgerows. To the southeast, it reaches the Baltic coast.

== Owners ==
- 1668: Crown
- 1668 - 1673: Jacob Nielsen Danefer
- 1673 - 1685: Crown
- 1685 - 1697: Samuel Christoph von Plessen
- 1697 - 1703: Crown
- 1703 - 1728: Casper Gottlob Moltke
- 1728 - 1739: Crown
- 1739 - 1747: Adam Gottlob Moltke
- 1749 - 1769: Frederik Christian von Møsting
- 1769: Crown
- 1769 - 1772: Esaias Fleischer / Magnus Beringschjold
- 1772 - 1777: Magnus Beringschjold
- 1777 - 1781: Charles François de Bosc de la Calmette
- 1781 - 1803: Antoine de Bosc de la Calmette
- 1803 - 1820: Charles de Bosc de la Calmette
- 1820 - 1821: Estate of Charles de Bosc de la Calmette
- 1821 - 1885: Peter Adolph Tutein
- 1885 - 1888: Estate of Peter Adolph Tutein
- 1888 - 1927: Hemming Moltke
- 1927 - 1948: Clara Schnack, Hemming Moltke's widow
- 1948 - 1984: Peter Christian Frederik Gustav, Count Moltke
- 1984–present: Birgitte Anna Caroline Hansdatter, Countess Moltke
