= Collett family =

Norwegian family of English origin

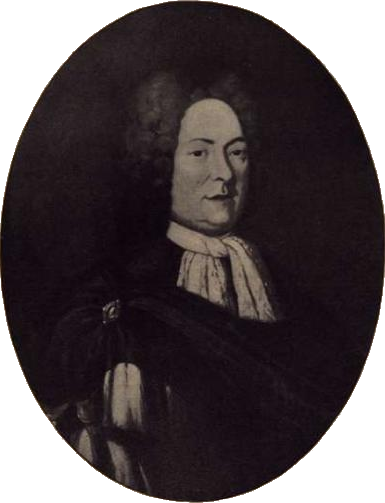
James Collett

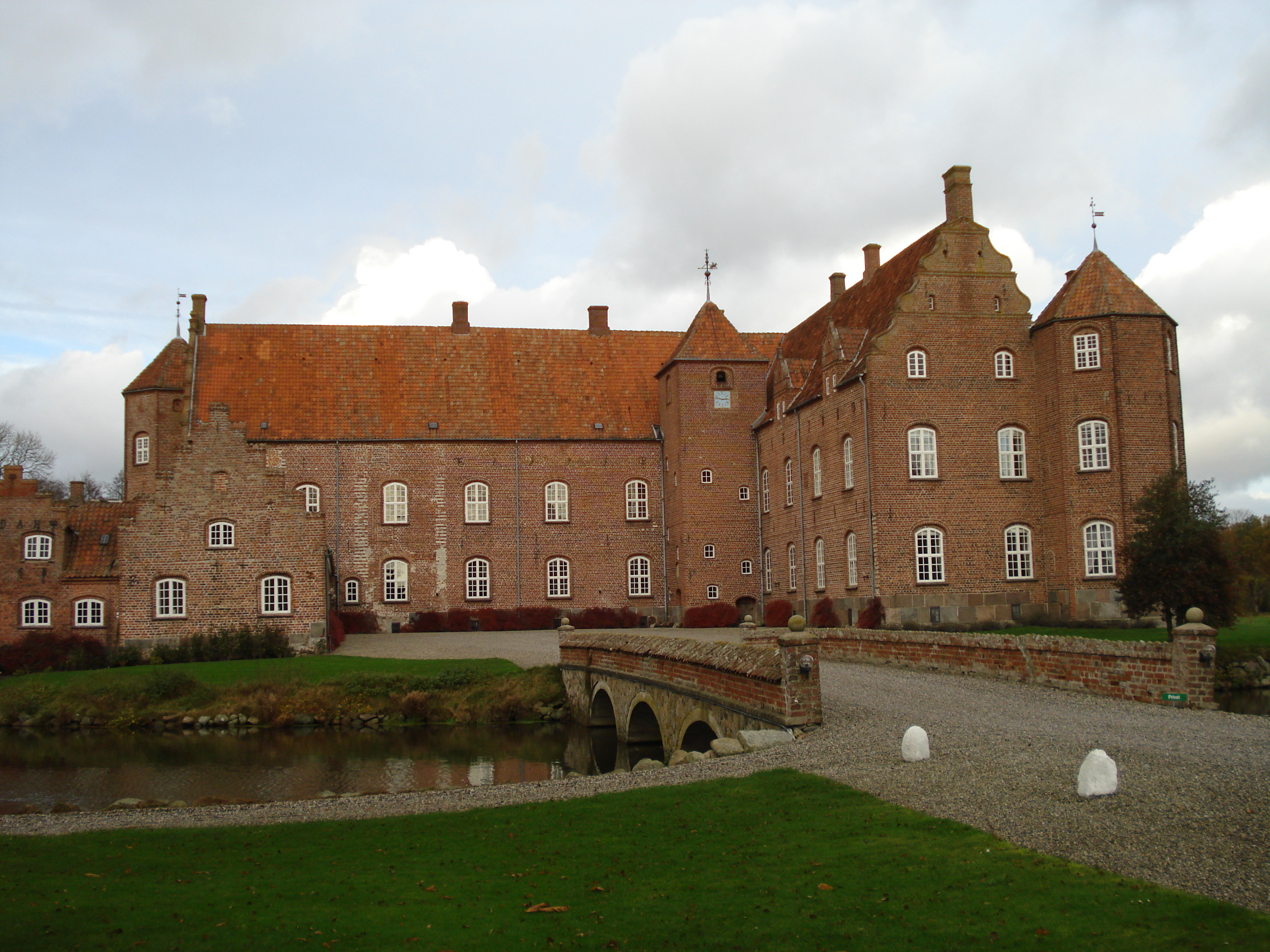
Katholm Castle in Denmark

Collett or Collet is a Norwegian family of English origin, descended from English-born merchant James Collett (born 1655 in London, died 1727 in Christiania), who settled in Christiania in 1683. He married Karen Leuch, and died as the richest man in the city. The firm he founded, Collett & Leuch, later renamed Collett & Søn (Collett & Son), was continued for four generations until 1821. The family became part of the patriciate of Christiania in the 18th century. His descendants continued to play important roles in Norwegian history and owned several properties, such as Buskerud Manor, Store Ullevål Manor, the hunting lodge 'Flateby', Økern Manor and Firma Albert Collett. One of the most well-known family members are statesman and First Minister Jonas Collett.

A Danish branch of the family is descended from Bernt Anker Collet, and uses the spelling Collet. They own the estates of Lundbygård and Katholm Castle, and formerly owned Rønnebæksholm.

== Famous members ==
- Albert Collett (1842–1896), owner of Firma Albert Collett and Buskerud Manor
- Alf Collett (1844–1919), genealogist
- Anne Cathrine Collett (1768–1846), owner of Lundbygård, the wealthiest woman in Denmark
- Arthur Collett (1879–1968), pediatrician
- Axel Collett (1880–1968), co-owner of Firma Albert Collett
- Bernt Anker Collet (1803–1857), owner of Lundbygård
- Bernt Johan Collet (born 1941), owner of Lundbygård, Danish Minister of Defense and chamberlain
- Brita Collett Paus (née Collett, 1917–1998), humanitarian
- Carl Oscar Collett (1922–2008), businessman and politician
- Charlotte Söderström (nee Persson, born 1977), horse breeder, 5x great-granddaughter of Peter Collett II and 4x great-granddaughter of John Collett II
- Christian Ancher Collett (1771–1833), engineer
- Christian Collett Kjerschow (1821–1889), politician, grandson of Christian Ancher Collett
- Christian Michelsen (1857–1925), first prime minister of an independent Norway, great-grandson of Christian Ancher Collett
- Christian Peder Bianco Boeck (1798–1877), biologist and physician, grandson of Peter Collett I
- Camilla Collett (née Wergeland, 1813–1895), writer
- Ditlevine Feddersen (née Collett, 1727–1803), poet
- Emil Collett (1875–1940), chemist
- Frederik Collett (1839–1914), painter
- James Collett (1655–1727), English merchant, patriarch of the dynasty
- Joakim Lehmkuhl (1895–1984), chairman of Timex and the Fatherland League, 2x great-grandson of Christian Ancher Collett
- Johan Collett (1775–1827), statesman
- Johan Collett II (1874–1969), businessman
- John Collett I (1758–1810), businessman
- John Collett II (1807–1891), landowner
- Jonas Collett (1772–1851), statesman
- Jonas Axel Boeck (1833–1873), marine biologist, grandson of Jonas Collett
- Julie Backer (1890–1977), statistician, head of SSB, 2x great-granddaughter of Jonas Collett
- Karl-Johan Persson (born 1975), chairman of H&M, 5x great-grandson of Peter Collett II and 4x great-grandson of John Collett II
- Lars Backer (1892–1930), pioneer of modern architecture in Norway, 2x great-grandson of Jonas Collett
- Mathia Collett (1737–1801), businesswoman, wife of Norway's then wealthiest person
- Mathias Collett (1708–1759), governor
- Nils Collett Vogt (1864–1937), poet
- Oscar Collett (1877–1950), landowner and benefactor
- Peter Collett I (1740–1786), landowner
- Peter Collett II (1766–1836), supreme court justice
- Peter Jonas Collett (1813–1851), jurist
- Peter Severin Steenstrup (1807–1863), naval officer, son of Thea Collett
- Robert Collett (1842–1913), zoologist
- Thorvald Boeck (1835–1901), jurist, owner the largest private library in Norway, grandson of Jonas Collett
- Tom Persson (born 1985), film producer, 5x great-grandson of Peter Collett II and 4x great-grandson of John Collett II

== Literature ==
- Alf Collett: En gammel Christiania-Slægt: Familien Collett og Christianias Fortid [An Old Christiania Family: the Collett family and Christiania's Past], Christiania 1888.
- Fotolitografisk Gjengivelse af det i Storthingets Arkiv opbevarede Original-Haandskrift af Kongeriget Norges Grundlov af 17.de Mai 1814 [Photolithographic Reproduction of the Original Manuscript of the Kingdom of Norway's Constitution of May 17, 1814 Preserved in the Storting Archive].
  —Shows eidsvollsmann's seal with family coat of arms.
- Haagen Krog Steffens: Norske Slægter 1912 [Norwegian Families 1912], Gyldendalske Boghandel, Christiania 1911.
- Hugo Høgdahl: Norske ex libris og andre bokeiermerker. Fra biskop Arne Sigurdsson til Gerhard Munthe [Norwegian Ex Libris and Other Book Ownership Marks: from Bishop Arne Sigurdsson to Gerhard Munthe], Oslo 1946, pp. 79–81.
  —Peter Collett's ex libris.
- Hans Cappelen: "Norske Serafimerridderes våpenskjold" [Coats of Arms of Norwegian Knights of the Order of the Seraphim], Heraldisk Tidsskrift, vol. 2, pp. 234–235, Copenhagen 1965–1969.
  —Jonas Collet's armorial plate in Riddarholmen Church, Stockholm.
- Hans Cappelen: Norske slektsvåpen [Norwegian Family Coats of Arms], Oslo 1969 (2nd ed. 1976), p. 82.
- Herman Leopoldus Løvenskiold: Heraldisk nøkkel [Heraldic Key], Oslo 1978.
- Harald Nissen and Monica Aase: Segl i Universitetsbiblioteket i Trondheim [Seals in Trondheim University Library], Trondheim 1990, p. 49.
