= Carl Oscar Collett =

Norwegian businessman and politician (1922 - 2008)

Carl Oscar Collett (2 February 1922 – 21 May 2008) was a Norwegian businessperson and politician for the Conservative Party.

He was born in Kristiania as a son of forester Oscar Collett (1877–1950) and Maria Iversen. He was a grandson of Albert Collett and nephew of Arthur, Emil, Johan and Axel Collett.

He finished Oslo Commerce School in 1940 and took the examen artium in 1941. He graduated from the National Forestry Academy in Steinkjer in 1943, and took the MBA at Harvard Business School in 1949. In 1948 he married Dagmar Gunla von Sydow Bødtker, a daughter of Henning Bødtker.

In 1950 he was hired in the family company Firma Albert Collett. He was a board member from 1954, and from 1963 to 1971 he owned the company together with Albert P. Collett and manager Andreas Ebbing. In 1971 he was hired as manager of Mathiesen Eidsvold Værk. In 1979 he went on to the Forest Industry Research Council.

Collett chaired the Conservative Party in Nord-Trøndelag from 1955 to 1957, and was a member of the party's central board the last year. He was a municipal council member in Klinga Municipality from 1960 to 1964 and in Namsos Municipality from 1964 to 1968. He was a working committee member of the employers' association Skogbrukets Arbeidsgiverforening from 1960 to 1970, chairing the organization from 1965 to 1969. He was a board member of the Forestry Association of 1950 from 1959 to 1971, chairing the organization from 1966 to 1970. He became a member of the gentlemen's skiing club SK Fram in 1972. He was also a supervisory council member of Forsikringsselskapet Viking.

He died in May 2008 and was buried at Ris.
