= Axel Collett =

Norwegian landowner, timber merchant and sawmill owner

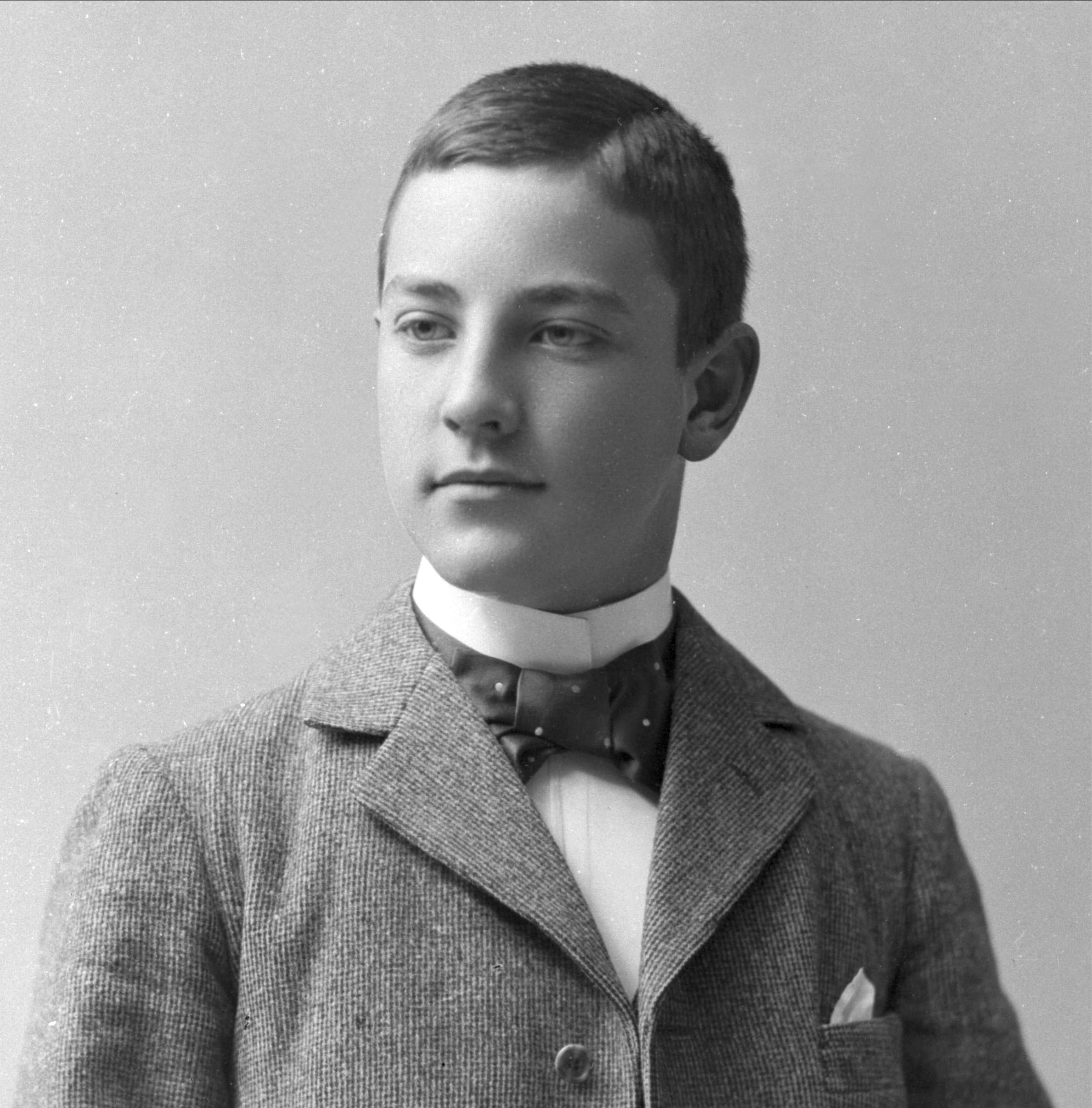
Axel Collett, photographed by Gustav Borgen

Axel Collett (6 August 1880 in Kolvereid – 17 January 1968) was a Norwegian landowner, timber merchant and sawmill owner. He was a co-owner and actively involved in the management of Firma Albert Collett, a firm established by his father, which was and is one of the largest private land owners of Norway. The company owned 1,200,000 decares (1,200 km^{2}) of land in Namdalen, and built Salsbruket Tresliperi, a sawmill, of which he also served as director.

A member of the English-origined Collett family, he was the son of land-owner Albert Collett, the grandson of land-owner John Collett of Buskerud Manor and the great-grandson of Supreme Court Justice and land-owner Peter Collett. He was the brother of Johan Collett, Oscar Collett and Emil Collett.

Axel Collett attended Dresden University of Technology, graduating as an engineer in 1906.

He was married to Lucie Trozelli Krefting (1896–1988), daughter of Rudolf Krefting and Märtha Trozelli, and they were the parents of humanitarian Brita Collett Paus.

Together with his brothers, he also commissioned the construction of a church in Nærøy.
