= Bernhard Paus =

Norwegian orthopedic surgeon and humanitarian

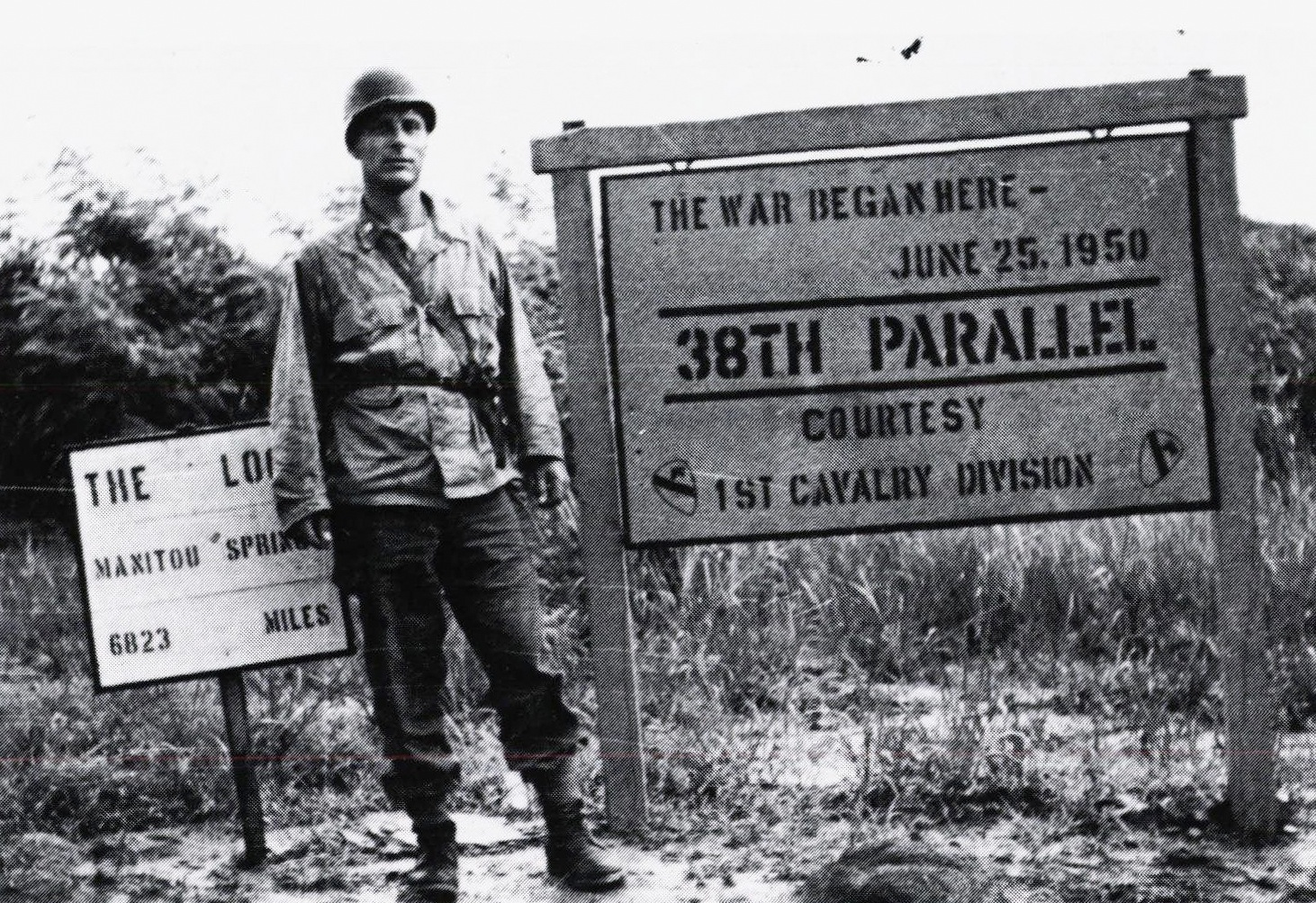
Bernhard Paus as chief surgeon of the Norwegian Mobile Army Surgical Hospital and chief physician of the Norwegian Armed Forces during the Korean War

Bernhard Cathrinus Paus (9 November 1910 – 9 February 1999) was a Norwegian orthopedic surgeon and humanitarian.

He participated in humanitarian work during the Winter War in Finland, during the 1940 Norwegian Campaign and during the Korean War, when he served as chief surgeon of the Norwegian Mobile Army Surgical Hospital. He was also the chief physician of the Norwegian Armed Forces (1951–1958) and President of the Norwegian Association for Military Medicine (1954–1955). He was senior consultant and managing director of the Martina Hansen Hospital in Bærum (1964–1980). He was Grand Master of the Norwegian Order of Freemasons from 1969 to 1990.

He was married to the noted humanitarian Brita Collett Paus, and they introduced the hospice concept in Norway.

== Biography ==
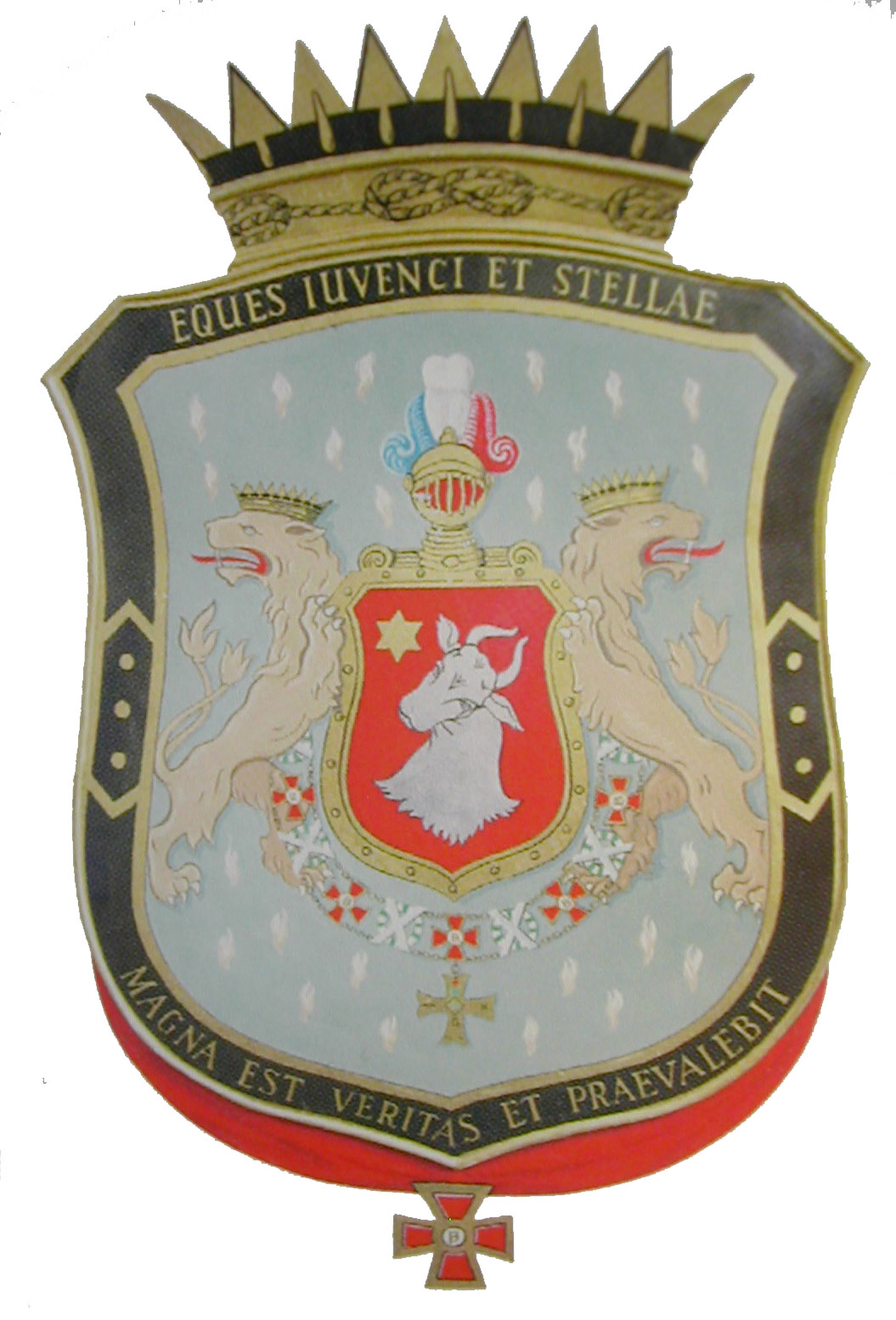
Coat of arms of Bernhard Paus as Grand Master of the Norwegian Order of Freemasons

Born in Oslo, he was a member of the Drammen branch of the Paus family and the son of the surgeon and President of the Norwegian Red Cross, Nikolai Nissen Paus.

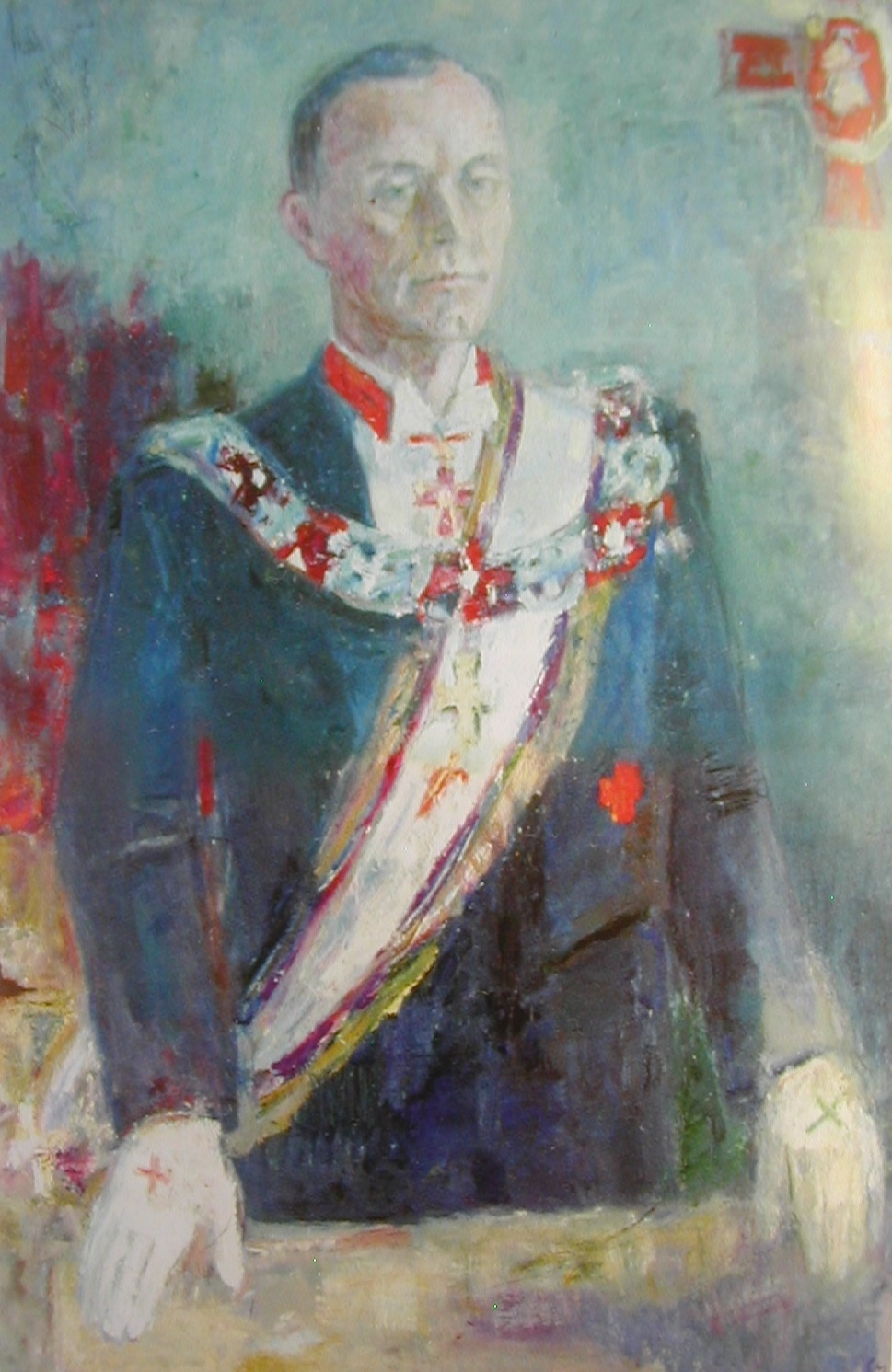
Bernhard Paus as Grand Master of the Norwegian Order of Freemasons

He finished medical school in 1936 and served as an officer during the Winter War in Finland and the war in Norway in 1940. Later he served in the Korean War, reaching the rank of lieutenant colonel. From 1951 to 1958 he served as chief physician of the Norwegian Armed Forces, and from 1964 to 1980 he was the director of the Martina Hansen Hospital in Bærum.

He was chairman of the Norwegian Association for Military Medicine (1954–55) and President of the Nordic Orthopaedic Federation (1974–76).

His wife, Brita Collett Paus (née Collett), founded the Catholic charitable organization Fransiskushjelpen in Norway. She was the daughter of Axel Collett, a co-owner of the Firma Albert Collett company, one of the largest land-owners in Norway. They had six children, including politician Lucie Paus Falck, surgeon Albert Collett Paus and businessman and investor Nikolai Bent Paus. He died in Agadir, Morocco.

His brother, lawyer and businessman Vilhelm Christian Paus (born 1915), was married to his wife's sister, Anne Collett (born 1918).

== Ranks and honours ==
=== Military ranks ===
- (Norway) 1951–1953 Major
- (Norway) 1953–1999 Lieutenant-colonel

=== Honours ===
- (Norway) Knight First Class of the Royal Norwegian Order of St. Olav (1980)
- Knight of the Order of Charles XIII (Sweden)
- Order of Vasa (Sweden, 1942)
- Decoration of honour of the Norwegian Red Cross
- Order of the Cross of Liberty with Sword (Finland)
- United Nations Korea Medal
- Bronze Star Medal (United States)
- (South Korea) Order of Diplomatic Service Merit of Korea

=== Other ===
- Honorary member of the Danish Order of Freemasons
- Honorary member of the Icelandic Order of Freemasons
- Honorary member of the Grand Landlodge of the Freemasons of Germany
- Honorary member of the Supreme Council, Scottish Rite, Northern Jurisdiction, USA
- Honorary member of the Supreme Council, Scottish Rite (Southern Jurisdiction, USA)
