= Fram =

Fram may refer to:

== Ships ==
- Fram (ship), an arctic exploration vessel from Norway
- MS Fram, expedition cruise ship owned by Hurtigruten Group

== Places and geography ==
- Fram, Paraguay, a town in Itapúa, Paraguay
- Fram Formation, a sequence of rock strata on Ellesmere Island, Canada
- Fram, Rače–Fram, a settlement in Slovenia
- Fram (river), a stream in Slovenia
- Framlingham, town in England referred to by locals as "Fram"
- Framingham, Massachusetts, a city often nicknamed "Fram"
  - Framingham State University, a university in that city also often nicknamed "Fram"
- Fram Strait, in the Arctic Ocean
- Fram Islands, in Antarctica
- Fram Mesa, in Antarctica
- Fram (crater), crater on Mars explored by the Opportunity rover

== Arts and culture ==
- Fram (play), by Tony Harrison
- Fram (Middle-earth), fictional character from the stories of J. R. R. Tolkien
- Fram, the Polar Bear, children's book by Romanian writer Cezar Petrescu
- Fram Museum, a museum in Oslo, Norway

== Sports ==
- Knattspyrnufélagið Fram, Icelandic association football club
- IF Fram Tórshavn, Faroese association football club
- IF Fram, Finnish association football club from Åland
- IF Fram Larvik, Norwegian sports club
- IL Fram, Norwegian sports club
- IL Hjelset-Fram, Norwegian sports club
- SK Fram (Oslo), Norwegian skiing and social club
- SK Fram, Norwegian sports club now a part of Selsbakk IF
- SK Fram, Norwegian sports club now a part of Brumunddal IL
- Framlingham Town F.C. (known as Fram), English association football club
- Fram Stadion, a football stadium in Larvik, Norway

== People ==
- Fram (name), list of people with the name

== As an acronym FRAM ==
- Fellow of the Royal Academy of Music in the University of London
- Ferroelectric RAM, a form of non-volatile random access memory
- Fleet Rehabilitation and Modernization, 1950s United States Navy program to refurbish WWII-era ships
  - A similar 1980s U.S. Coast Guard program to modernize its Hamilton-class cutters
- Flight Releasable Attachment Mechanism for orbital replacement units on external stowage platforms of the International Space Station
- Functional Resonance Analysis Method, Modelling Complex Socio-technical Systems, by Erik Hollnagel

== Other uses ==
- FRAM (brand), an American brand of automotive parts
- Fram (bicycle company), a Swedish bicycle manufacturer
- The Fram controversy, a 2019 controversy on English Wikipedia

== See also ==
- Fram 2 (disambiguation)
