= Utheim =

Utheim is a surname. Notable people with the surname include:

- John Utheim (1847–1910), Norwegian teacher
- Kirsten Utheim Toverud (1890–1949), Norwegian pediatrician
- Trygve Utheim (1884–1952), Norwegian jurist and politician
