= Alf Meberg =

Norwegian pediatrician (born 1942)

Alf Endre Meberg (born 14 September 1942, in Farsund) is a Norwegian pediatrician, mainly known for his work on congenital heart defects. He was Secretary-General of the Nordic Pediatric Society from 1981 and Vice President of the Norwegian Society of Pediatricians from 1988 to 1991. He is a former editor of the Journal of the Norwegian Perinatal Society and a former associate editor of Acta Paediatrica.

Meberg graduated as cand.med. at the University of Oslo in 1969 and became a specialist in pediatrics in 1977. He obtained the Dr.med. degree at the University of Oslo in 2002. He worked at Ullevål Hospital and Aker Hospital, and became Head of Pediatrics at Vestfold Hospital in 1991.

== Honours ==
- Honorary member of the Norwegian Perinatal Society
