= Anders Beer =

Anders Beer may refer to:

- Anders Beer (shipowner) (1801–1863), Norwegian shipowner and tanner
- Anders Beer (engineer) (1875–1957), Norwegian businessman

== See also ==
- Anders Beer Wilse (1865–1949), Norwegian photographer
