= Albert Collett =

Norwegian businessman, timber merchant and sawmill owner

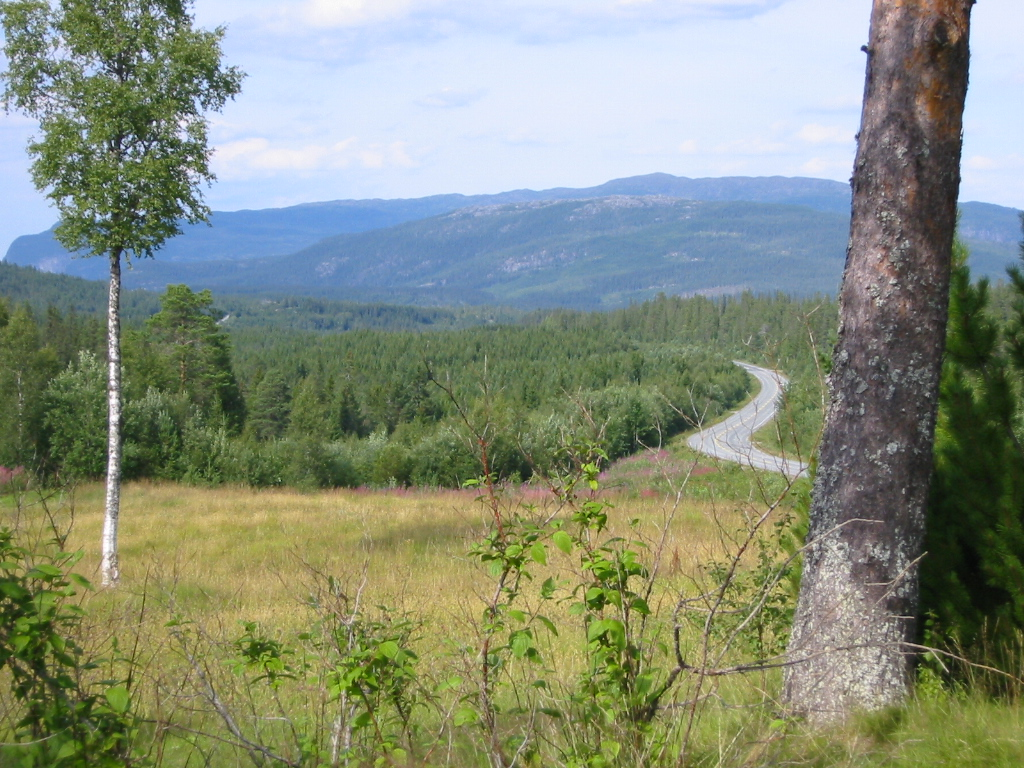
Albert Collett was one of the largest landowners in the valley of Namdalen

Albert Peter Severin Collett (15 September 1842 – 25 June 1896) was a Norwegian businessman, timber merchant and sawmill owner. He founded Firma Albert Collett and became one of the largest landowners in the valley of Namdalen in Nord-Trøndelag, Norway.

Collett was born at Buskerud Manor at Åmot in Modum Municipality, Norway. He was the youngest son of landowner John Collett (1807–1891), grandson of judge Peter Collett and grandnephew of Christian Ancher Collett. He was also the father of chemist and industrialist Emil Collett and physician Arthur Collett.

He was originally a clerk in Christiania Bank og Kreditkasse. He is most associated with his take over the Salsbruket Agricultural Stakeholder Society (Salsbrukets Interessentselskab) at Nærøy Municipality in Nord-Trøndelag. Collett took over the operation which had interests in forestry and lumber production. At the same time, he bought several other properties in the area in Kolvereid Municipality and Foldereid Municipality (now both part of Nærøysund Municipality). In 1871, he founded Firma Albert Collett and turned it into a real estate management company.

He became one of the largest landowners in the valley of Namdalen. The acquisition of Salsbruket secured hydropower from the Opløelva river at Salsbruket and a good port at Opløfjorden. He soon had large modern sawmills in full operation. The sawmill operation lasted until 1898. After his death in 1896, management of the company was taken over by his widow Nanna Høegh Collett (1854–1921), then from 1912 their sons Johan (b. 1874), Oscar (b. 1876) and Axel (b. 1880).
