= Jomfruland National Park =

National park in Norway

- IUCN category II (national park)
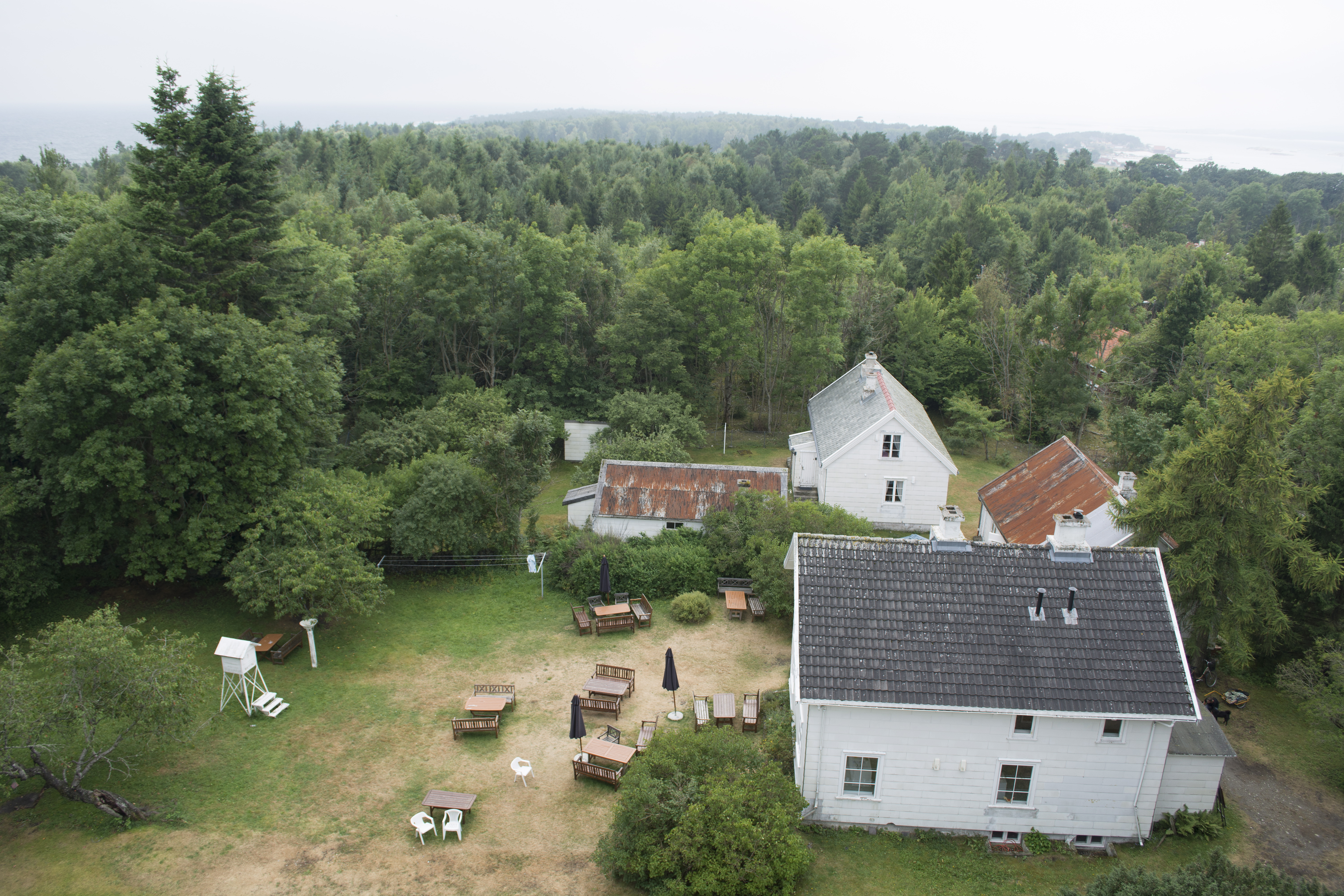
- Interactive map of Jomfruland National Park
- Location: Kragerø, Norway
- Nearest city: Kragerø
- Coordinates: 58°51′11″N 9°33′08″E
- Area: 117 km^{2} (45 sq mi)
- Established: 16 December 2016
- Governing body: Norwegian Environment Agency

Jomfruland National Park (Norwegian: Jomfruland nasjonalpark) is a national park in Kragerø Municipality in Telemark county, Norway. Jomfruland covers an area of 117 km^{2} (45 sq mi), including the islands of Jomfruland and Stråholmen. About 98% of the park area is sea. The park was established on 16 December 2016.
