= Nordic Pediatric Society =

- Formation: 1916; 110 years ago
- Type: Medical association

The Nordic Pediatric Society is a medical association for pediatricians in the Nordic countries. Its member organisations include the Danish Paediatric Society, the Norwegian Society of Pediatricians, the Swedish Paediatric Society, the Finnish Pediatric Association and the Icelandic Pediatric Association.

The society was founded in Copenhagen in 1916. It has hosted Nordic pediatric congresses since 1919, and also works to promote cooperation among Nordic, European and international pediatric bodies.

== Presidents ==
- Bengt Björkstén (1992–2000)

== Secretaries-General ==
- Peter Johan Moe (1969–1981)
- Alf Meberg (1981–)
