= Brita Collett Paus =

Norwegian humanitarian leader

Brita Lucie Collett Paus
- Born: Brita Lucie Collett; 3 July 1917; Salsbruket, Norway
- Died: 28 June 1998 (aged 80); Oslo, Norway
- Occupation: humanitarian leader
- Known for: founding the charity Fransiskushjelpen
- Spouse: Bernhard Paus (m. 1937)
- Relatives: Axel Collett (father); Lucie Paus Falck (daughter)
- Family: Collett

Brita Lucie Collett Paus (3 July 1917 – 28 June 1998) was a Norwegian humanitarian leader and the founder of Fransiskushjelpen, a Catholic charitable organisation in Norway. She led the organisation from 1956 until 1993.

She converted to Catholicism from Lutheranism in 1950, and served as chair of the Laity Council of the Roman Catholic Diocese of Oslo, as board member of Caritas in Norway from 1965 and member of governmental committees.

She was married to orthopedic surgeon Bernhard Paus, the Grand Master of the Norwegian Order of Freemasons. Their daughter Lucie Paus Falck became a politician.

She was the daughter of landowner Axel Collett and Lucie Trozelli Krefting, and a member of the Collett family.

== Honours ==
- St. Hallvard Medal, 1975
- Knight First Class of the Royal Norwegian Order of St. Olav, 1976
- Pro Ecclesia et Pontifice, 1976
- Grand Duchy of Luxembourg
- Torstein Dale Memorial Prize (Norwegian Red Cross)
- Rotary International's Paul Harris Fellow Award

== Literature ==
- Maria Giæver: Fransiskushjelpen: Help, relieve, be present. Holm & Tangen Publishing, 2006.
