= Oscar Collett =

Norwegian landowner and benefactor

Oscar Collett (9 December 1877 – 1950) was a Norwegian landowner and benefactor.

He was born in Trondhjem as a son of landowner Albert Peter Severin Collett (1842–1896) and Nanna Høegh (1854–1921). He was a brother of physician Arthur Collett and chemist Emil Collett.

He was a forester by education, and spent his career as an executive of the family-owned forest estate company Firma Albert Collett together with his brothers Johan and Axel. The company still operates hundreds of square miles of forest in Namdalen, as well as several hydroelectric power stations.

Collett became a member of the gentlemen's skiing club SK Fram in 1890, the club's second year of existence. From 1935 he served as a supervisory council member of the insurance company Forsikringsselskapet Viking, together with many acquaintances from Fram.

He was a deputy board member of the Norwegian Forestry Society and the Det norske Myrselskap. He was also a co-founder of the first incarnation of the Norwegian Ornithological Society and its journal Norsk Ornithologisk Tidsskrift in 1920. By the end of 1920 Collett had become the single largest benefactor to the journal; with a gift of 1200 kr he had contributed 22% of the journal's assets, more than twice as much as any other individual. He sat on the Ornithological Society's interim board until the first general assembly in 1922, where he was elected deputy board member.

Oscar Collett died in 1950, and was buried at Vestre gravlund. His son Carl Oscar Collett, who was born 1922 and whose mother was Maria Iversen, became a landowner and politician. Carl Oscar became a son-in-law of Henning Bødtker, and was admitted to SK Fram, continuing the family tradition.
