= Enerhaugen =

Area of Oslo, Norway

Coordinates: 59°54′46.562″N 10°46′9.5772″E

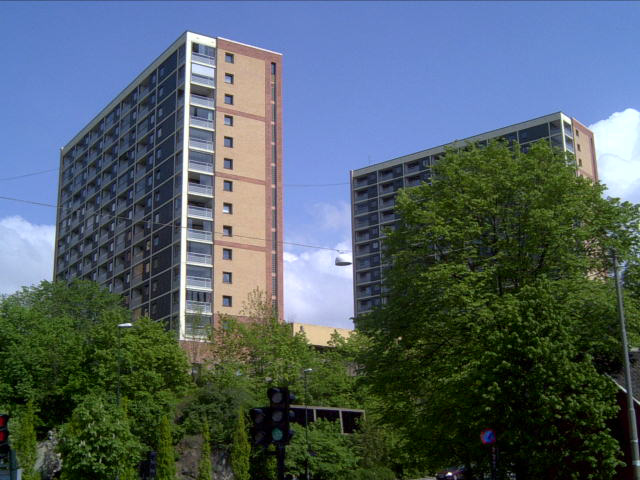
Apartment tower blocks at Enerhaugen

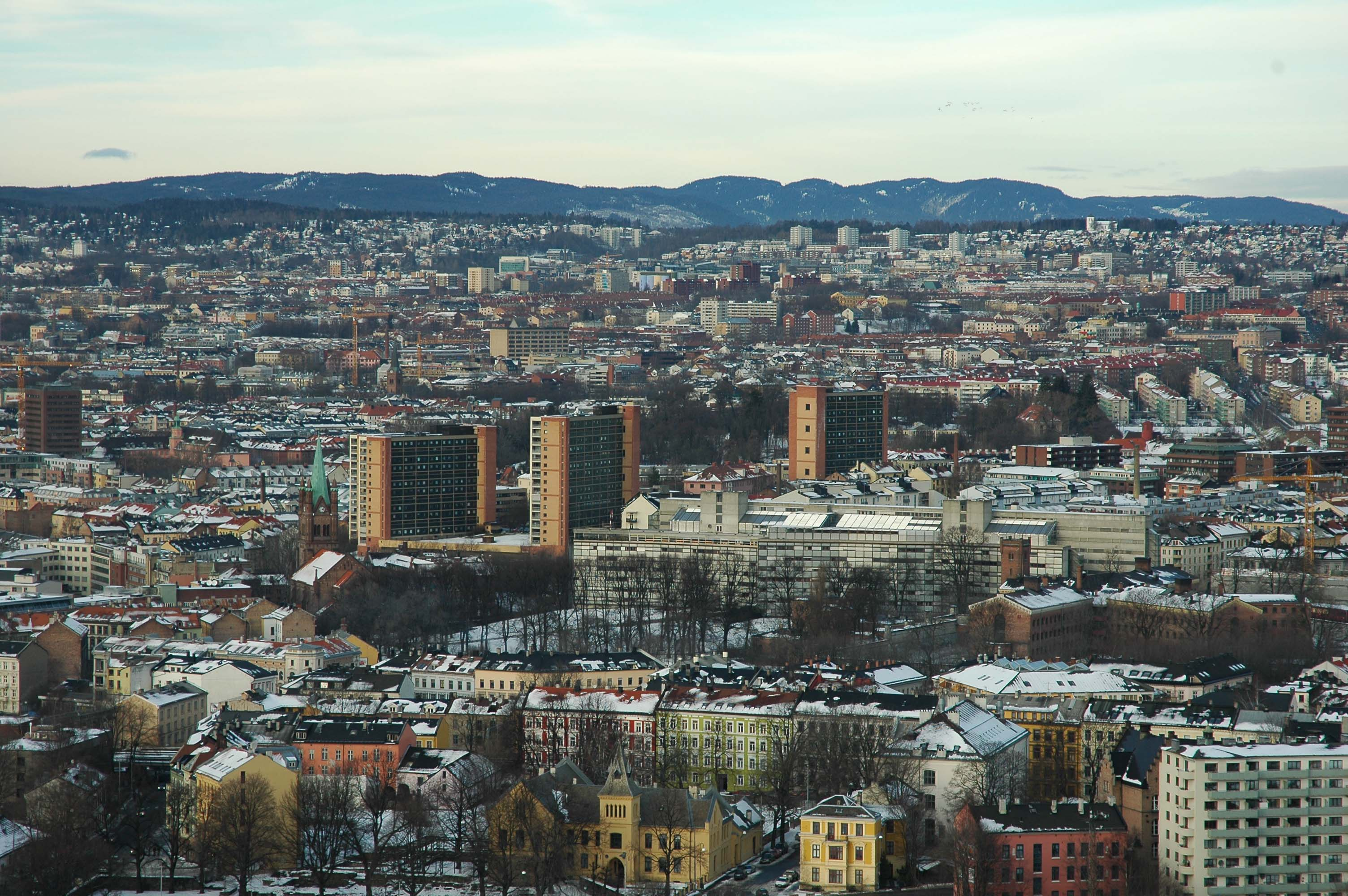
Enerhaugen as seen from Ekeberg

Enerhaugen is today a neighborhood in Oslo, Norway which among others includes six apartment buildings on Tøyen in the borough of Gamle Oslo, located north of the neighborhood of Grønland. The site is located on a hill just south of Tøyen manor, and was largely undeveloped in the first half of the 1800s, where it then became a sort of suburb of Oslo. The streets of today's Enerhaugen is Sørligata, Enerhaugggata and Smedgata. The closest subway station is Tøyen.

In Enerhauggata 4, St. Hallvard's Church, the largest parish of the Catholic Diocese of Oslo. The church is now protected and had formerly a Franciscan monastery, which is now being converted into apartments for Catholic priests.

== History ==
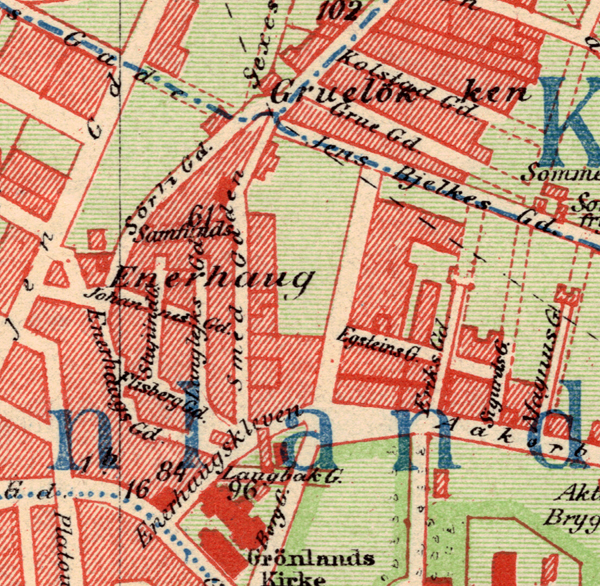
Enerhaugen approx. 1900

The census in 1801 recorded 43 people living on or near Enerhaugen. In 1815 the area was purchased by the city of Oslo's richest man at the time, Jørgen Young. He dismembered Enerhaugen for over 70 allotments and a few years emerged an entire suburb. Here the labor people build on affordable land and the opportunity to build simple houses of wood - out of the city with its bricked enforcement. In 1842 it was registered over 1200 people who had settled here. The settlement consisted of single storey and a half storey house made log or half-timbered houses.

It was bad conditions on Enerhaugen and cholera epidemics in 1850 affected areas east of the river Akerselva hard because of the tight housing, poor water supply and poor hygiene.

Enerhaugen was incorporated into the city of Christiania in 1859. The city took measures to give the new districts better municipal services and better hygiene. In Grønlandsleiret, just below Enerhaugen, the municipality built school, Grønland Church and a fire station in 1860. On Enerhaugen were new houses built, water supply was improved and the narrow, crooked streets were made navigable. Enerhaugen got public baths in the late 1800s. A new school was built on Enerhaugen in 1867

Due to housing shortages in the interwar years, the Oslo City Council began working on planning the construction of new homes. In 1947, the City Council unanimously approved an Enerhaugen that would become one of the areas in the city that would " decontaminated " by demolishing the old buildings and building new. The executive committee voted for demolition with a majority of only one vote.

The old wooden houses were demolished in 1960 and replaced by the housing cooperative OBOS with four tower blocks (six blocks were planned) in 13 to 15 floors, designed by architect Sofus Haugen. The project was completed in 1965.

During the demolition work was found iron bolts from the time when boats were moored at Enerhaugen before the uplift caused the fjord withdrew.

The streets Enerhauggata, Sørligata and Smedgata still exists, while Langleiken, Stupinngata, Johannesgata and Flisberget are street names from the old Enerhaugen which today are gone.

== Enerhaugen at the Norwegian Museum of Cultural History ==
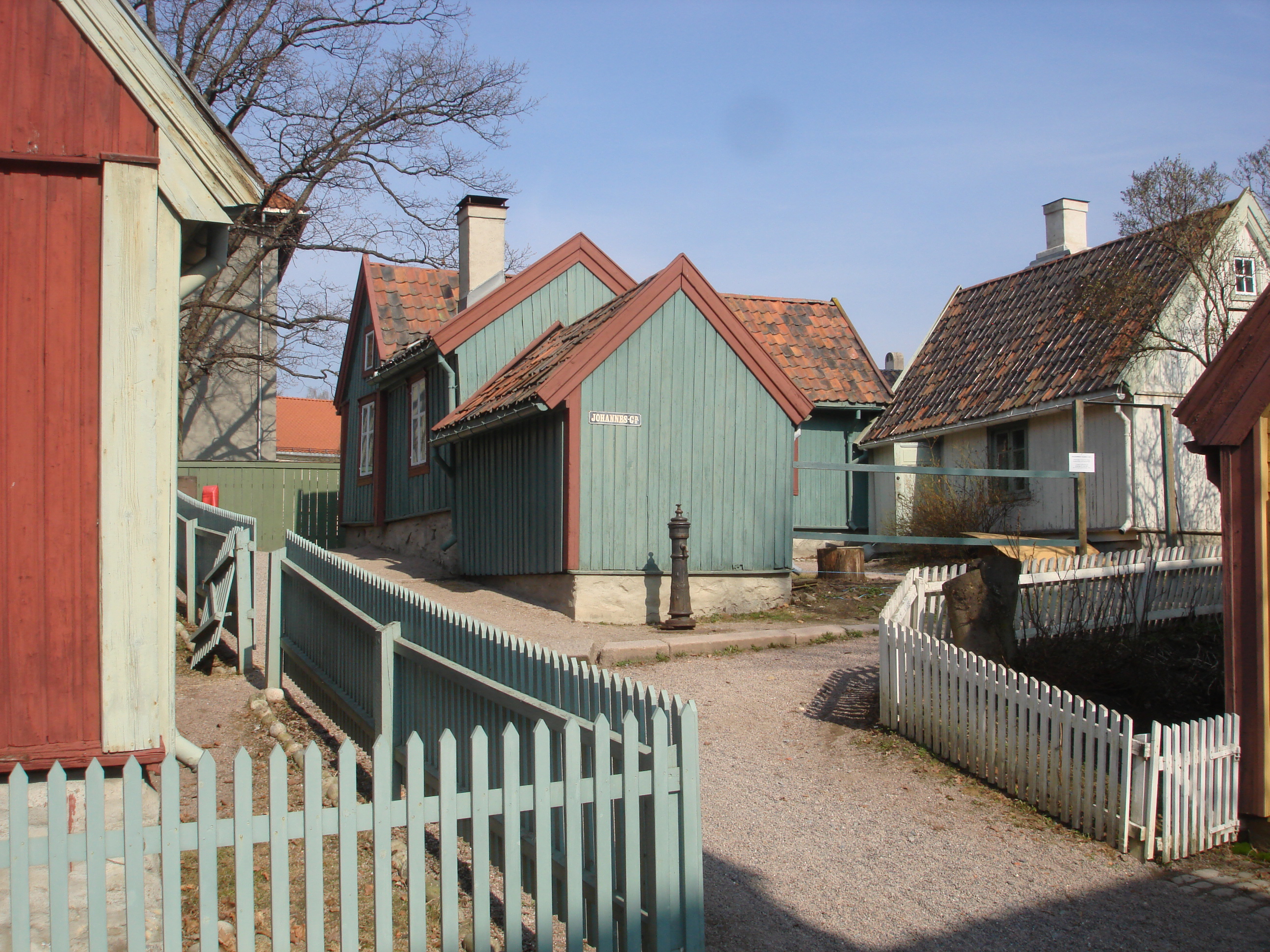
Houses from former Enerhaugen, now at Norwegian Museum of Cultural History at Bygdøy

Five of the old houses were moved and rebuilt at the Norwegian Museum of Cultural History and furnished the basis of the census of 1865, 1891 and opened to the public in 1969. In 2011-2012, the five houses redecorated, and two of them are now decorated as homes respectively from 1909 to 1959.

== Norwegian short films ==
- «Hovedstadens gamle forsteder», S. Maartmann-Moe, 1953
- «Grünerløkka», Finn Carlsby, 1973
