= Jomfruland Lighthouse =

Lighthouse in Telemark, Norway

Jomfruland Lighthouse Jomfruland fyrstasjon
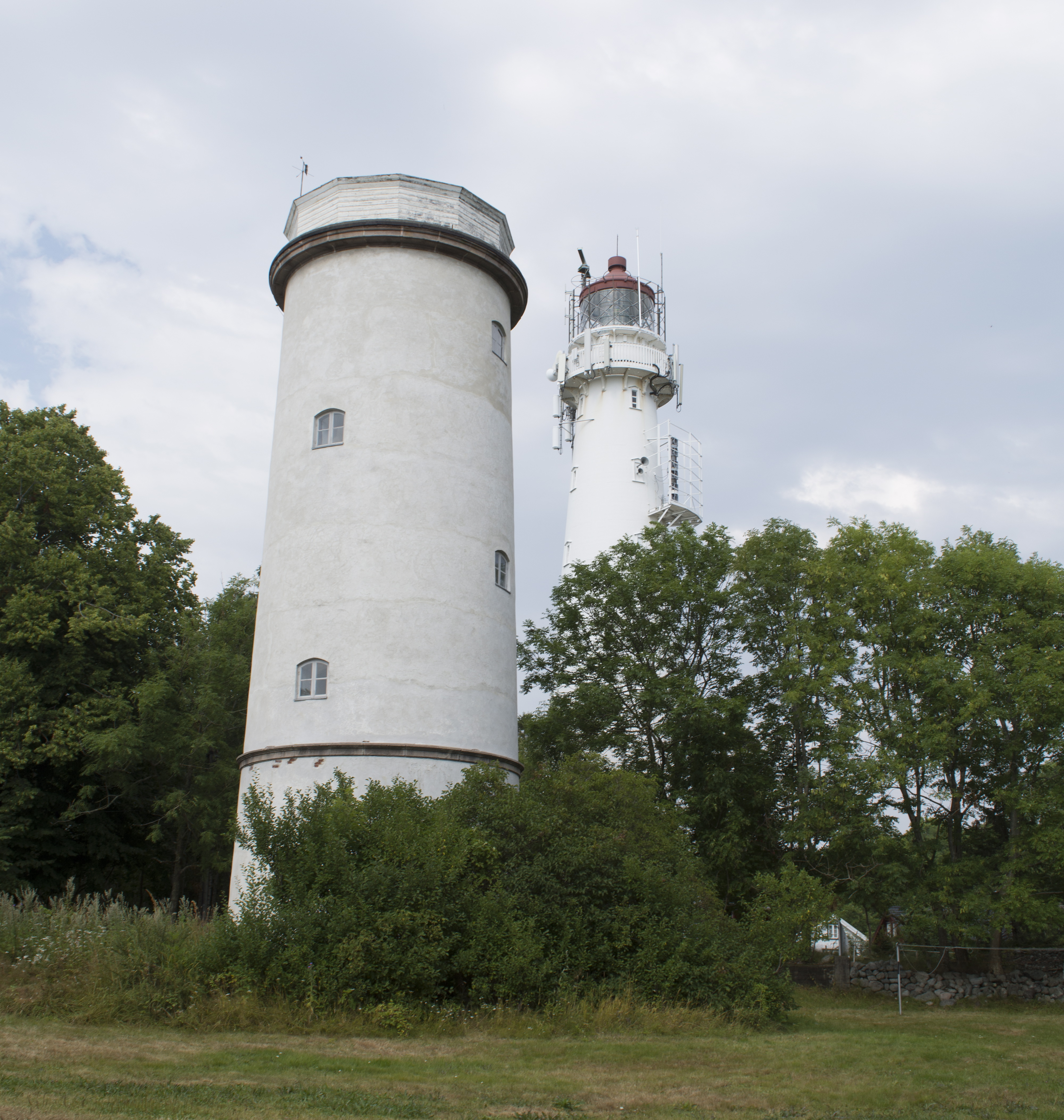
- View of the lighthouse
- Location of the lighthouse
- Location: Telemark, Norway
- Coordinates: 58°51′54″N 9°35′46″E

Tower
- Constructed: 1839 (first)
- Construction: brick tower (first) cast iron tower (current)
- Automated: 1991
- Height: 31 metres (102 ft)
- Shape: cylindrical
- Markings: white tower, red lantern and dome
- Heritage: cultural property

Light
- First lit: 1938 (current)
- Focal height: 48 metres (157 ft)
- Lens: second order Fresnel lens
- Range: 18.4 nmi (34.1 km; 21.2 mi)
- Characteristic: Fl W 15s
- Norway no.: 052153

Jomfruland Lighthouse (Norwegian: Jomfruland fyr) is a coastal lighthouse located on the island of Jomfruland in Kragerø Municipality in Telemark county, Norway. The original tower, made of bricks, was first lit in 1839. Another tower, made of iron, was built in 1939.

The lighthouse sits on top of a 31-metre (102 ft) tall cylindrical cast iron tower. The lighthouse was painted white with a red roof. The light sits at an elevation of 48 metres (157 ft) above sea level. The tower emits a continuous white light with a brighter flash every 15 seconds.

== See also ==
- Lighthouses in Norway
- List of lighthouses in Norway
