= Lucie Paus Falck =

Norwegian politician

- Born: 8 May 1938 (age 87)
- Occupation: Politician

Lucie Paus Falck (born 8 May 1938) is a Norwegian politician for the Labour Party.

She served as a deputy representative to the Norwegian Parliament from Akershus during the term 1989–1993. From 1988 to 1989, during the second cabinet Brundtland, Paus Falck was appointed State Secretary of the Ministry of Local Government and Labour.

On the local level Paus Falck was the mayor of Enebakk from 1984 to 1987.

She has been the President of the Norwegian-Korean Friendship Association since its inception in 2009.

Lucie Paus Falck is the daughter of noted Freemason Bernhard Paus and noted Franciscan Brita Collett Paus.
