= Kirsten Utheim Toverud =

Norwegian pediatrician

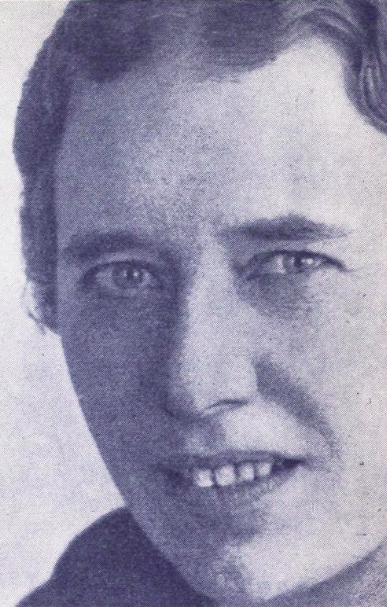
- Born: 10 January 1890; Veblungsnes, Norway
- Died: 12 July 1949 (aged 59); Iowa City
- Occupation: Pediatrician
- Relatives: Trygve Utheim (brother)

Kirsten Utheim Toverud (10 January 1890 – 12 July 1949) was a Norwegian pediatrician.

== Personal life ==
Toverud was born on 10 January 1890 in Veblungsnes, to businessman Bergsvein Utheim and Anette Toenberg, and was a sister of Trygve Utheim. She married odontologist Guttorm Toverud in 1922.

== Career ==
Toverud graduated as cand.med. in 1916, and dr.med. in 1923, the third woman in Norway to graduate with a doctor degree in medicine.

Her research focused on children's diseases, in particular nutritional disturbances. She was engaged in public health and social medicine. On her initiative, Norwegian Women's Public Health Association opened a station for guiding pregnant women in 1925, the first such in Norway. She chaired the Norwegian Society of Pediatricians from 1934 to 1936.
