= Norwegian Ornithological Society (1920–1935) =

The Norwegian Ornithological Society of 1920 (Norwegian: Norsk ornithologisk forening av 1920) was a Norwegian society for the promotion of ornithological studies.

== History ==
The society was founded by H. Tho. L. Schaaning, an academic and bird collector who had worked as curator at Stavanger Museum since 1918. He called for a "Norwegian ornithological central station" to be located in Stavanger, in a May 1920 article in the Stavangeren newspaper. His pleas were not only for a research station, but also the establishment of a society for the promotion of ornithological studies.

In June 1920, Schaaning got in contact with six people willing to form an interim board of a Norwegian Ornithological Society. They were Gustav A. Arentz, Frederik Hansen, Erik Berentsen, Aamund Salveson (chair, deputy chair and two board members of Stavanger Museum), Oscar Collett and Carl Emil Petersen. Together Schaaning and this group campaigned in newspapers nationwide, calling for benefactors to help found an ornithological academic journal.

By the end of 1920 Collett (and his wife) were the single largest benefactors of the journal; by 1200 kr he had contributed 22% of the journal's assets, more than twice as much as any other individual. Arentz, Petersen, Berentsen and Jakob Dreyer followed with a NOK 500 grant; Hansen and P. Chr. Schaaning contributed NOK 200. Four people gave 100, six people gave 50, five gave 30 and fifty gave NOK 20. Norsk ornithologisk tidsskrift was issued for the first time in March 1921.

The interim board functioned until the first general assembly of the Ornithological Society, on 31 March 1922. It was decided that the board membership should reflect Norway's five regions (East, South, West, Central and North). Since the organization was operated out of Stavanger, however, it would prove difficult to hold regular meetings. It was therefore decided to supply the board with four deputies, all residing near Stavanger. As board members, the general assembly elected H. Tho. L. Schaaning (South), Askell Røskeland (West), Hjalmar Broch (East), Håkon Lie (Central) and Herm. Fjeldberg (North). Deputies became Gustav A. Arentz, Frederik Hansen, Erik Berentsen, Oscar Collett and Thes. Poulsson.

The membership remained steady at c.190–200 people. No members' meetings were held; exceptionally some meetings were arranged by Herman L. Løvenskiold in Oslo in the late 1920s. The last written annual report was published as Norsk ornithologisk tidsskrift in 1931 describing the year 1928–29. It continued until April 1935 when issue 14–15 was published, and went defunct after that. The society was succeeded by a new Norwegian Ornithological Society in 1957.
