= James Collett =

Norwegian businessman (1655–1727)

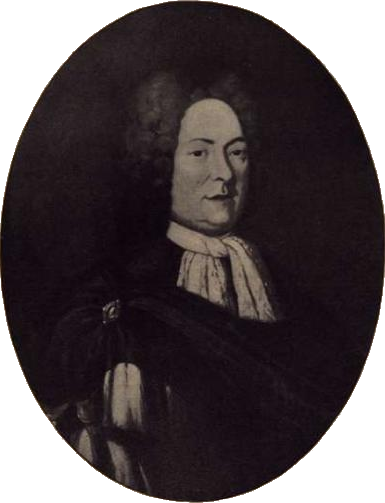
- James Collett
- Born: 18 August 1655; London, England
- Died: 29 May 1727 (aged 71)
- Occupation: Businessman

James Collett (18 August 1655 – 29 May 1727) was an English-born Norwegian merchant.

== Life ==
James Collett was born in London, England. As a young man, he worked for an English wholesaler. In 1683, he settled in Christiania (now Oslo), Norway as factor of English merchants. In 1686, he married Karen Leuch (1666–1745), daughter of the wealthy Christiania merchant Peder Pedersen Leuch (1636–1693). With time, he became the largest timber trader in Christiania. In the early 18th century, he exported more timber from Christiania than anybody else and operated a fleet of ships. The firm he founded, Collett & Leuch, (later Collett & Son), continued within the family for four generations.

The marriage of James Collett and Karen Leuch resulted in the birth of nine children. The family became part of the patriciate of Christiania in the 18th century.

== See also ==
- Collett family
