= Jomfruland =

Island in Telemark, Norway

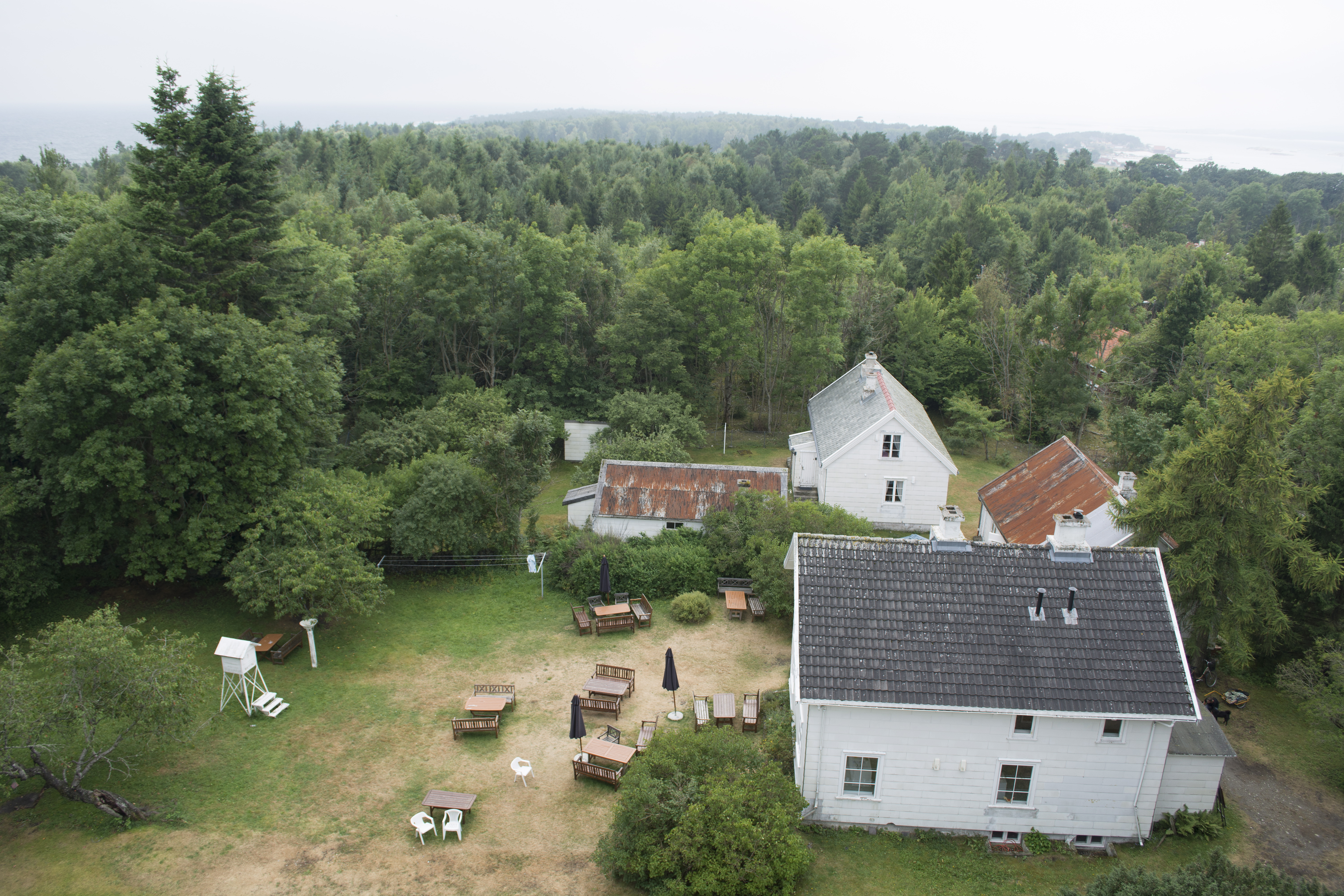
- Jomfruland Lighthouse keeper's quarters
- Interactive map of the island

Geography
- Location: Telemark, Norway
- Coordinates: 58.8651°N 9.59638°E
- Archipelago: Kragerø
- Area: 3.04 km^{2} (1.17 sq mi)
- Length: 7.5 km (4.66 mi)
- Width: 1 km (0.6 mi)
- Highest elevation: 24 m (79 ft)

Administration
- Norway
- County: Telemark
- Municipality: Kragerø Municipality

Demographics
- Population: 75 (2023)

Jomfruland is an island in Kragerø Municipality in Telemark county, Norway. The small elongated island is located off the coast of the mainland, about 2 kilometres (1.2 mi) south of the island of Stråholmen. It measures about 7.5 by 1 kilometre (4.66 mi × 0.62 mi) in size. Jomfruland provides shelter to the many islands of the Kragerø archipelago from the Skagerrak sea. In 2023, there were about 75 permanent residents living on the island, along with many holiday homes on the island.

Approximately on the island's center there are two white lighthouses – one old and one new. Only the newer Jomfruland Lighthouse is in use today. The lighthouses are most characteristic and can be seen from all sides. These towers are often referred to as the characterizing feature of Kragerø and the archipelago.

Access to Jomfruland is by water taxi, car ferry, or by private vessel. The island has several guest harbours. The island has several attractions, among which are splendid beaches, developed docks with restaurant and kiosk facilities, pebble beaches on the island's north side, as well as good hiking possibilities for tourists and residents alike.

== Name etymology ==
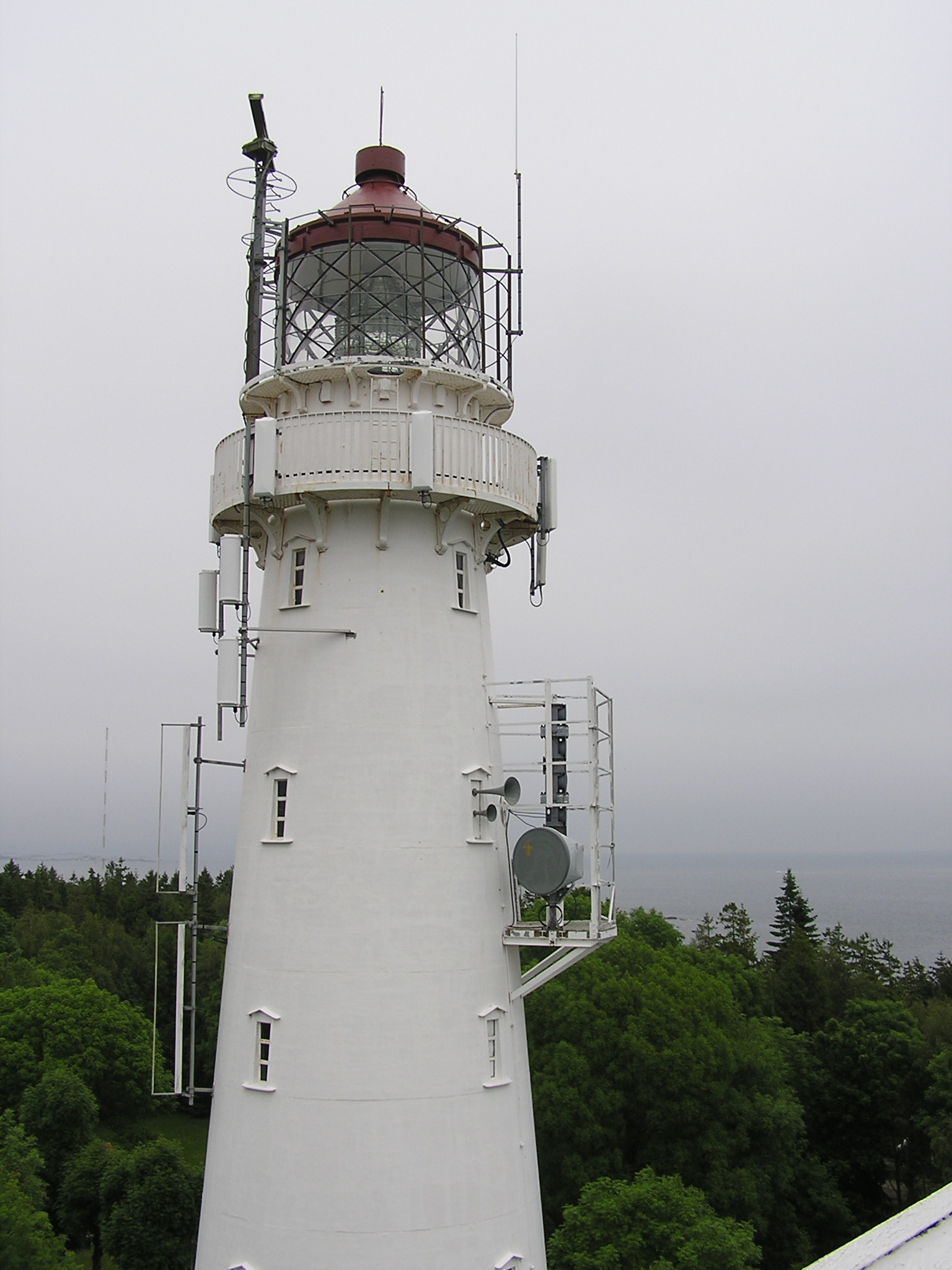
Jomfruland Lighthouse

The island was originally named Aur (Old Norse: Aurr). That name was identical to the word aurr which means "gravel" or "wet clay", likely since there is very little good soil on the island–it is mostly sand and pebbles because it is part of a moraine that was made during the last ice age. By the 1400s and 1500s, the island had become known as "Jomfruland", a more poetic name. The first element comes from the word jomfru which means "virgin", here likely referring to the Virgin Mary. Another theory is that the waters in that area are very clean or clear (virgin-like). The last element is land which means "land" or "district".

== Plant and animal life ==
Jomfruland is famous for its abundance of European thimbleweed, a feature which made it a location for the 1995 Norwegian movie production of Sigrid Undset's Kristin Lavransdatter. Every spring, in the beginning of May, the white thimbleweed spreads out like a blanket across the island.

The island is also known for its rich bird life, with more than 300 species having been spotted. Jomfruland Bird Station (Jomfruland Fuglestasjon) is a facility run by the Telemark chapter of the Norwegian Ornithological Society. The station which was established in 1969 is located at Øitangen on the northern peak of the island. Much of the bird migration each spring and autumn follows the coastline and passes by the island's northern peak. From March through November the station is staffed continuously. Many civilian service personnel have been deployed here since the 1990s, and these together with other persons in short-term employment have provided the backbone of the service which however also benefits from many volunteer workers.

Due to the island's diverse plant life, a relatively large number of nesting bird species have been documented. As of March 2006, 92 species were breeding, and of these, approximately 40-50 every year. The barred warbler is one of the regular species with Jomfruland perhaps being the only location in Norway where this bird breeds. Also thrush nightingale, common rosefinch and red-backed shrike are regular breeding species, whereas more irregular finds are of greenish warbler (1992 – only breeding observation in Norway), stock pigeon, northern shoveler and barnacle goose (the latter two on nearby islands). A vast number of birds breed on islets and skerries around Jomfruland, one of these being the black guillemot.

== Geology ==
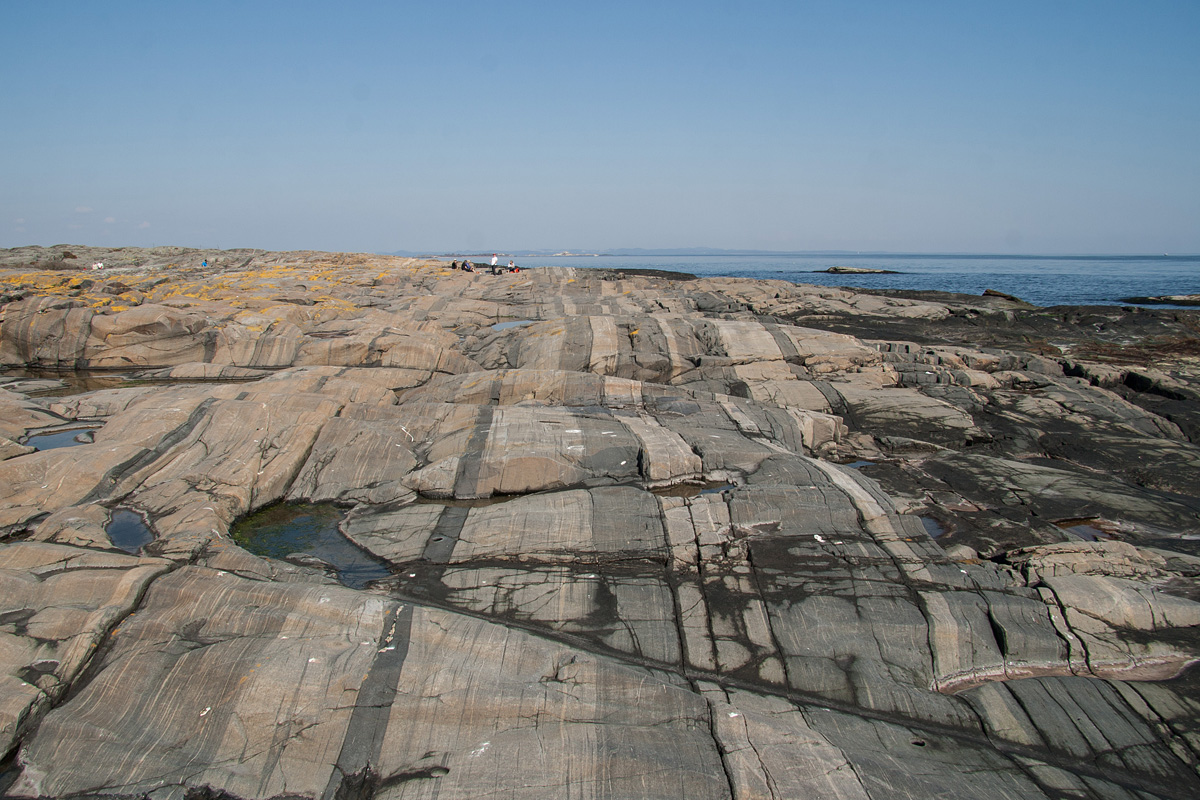
Rock formation on Vestre Saltstein, Jomfruland

Geologically, Jomfruland is part of a large residual moraine from the Ice Age called the Raet step. Jomfruland is the product of the back parts of the moraine (Raet) sticking out of the water. Eastward, the moraine remains underwater from Jomfruland to Mølen in Larvik Municipality, before it reappears after crossing the island of Tromøya. Where the Raet moraine is connected to the mainland it forms pebble beaches. Between Jomfruland and Tromøy there are shallow waters in places where the moraine almost reaches the water surface.

== Climate ==
Climate data for Jomfruland Lighthouse 1991-2020 (3 m, average high/low 2003-2025)
Month	Jan	Feb	Mar	Apr	May	Jun	Jul	Aug	Sep	Oct	Nov	Dec	Year
Mean daily maximum °C (°F)	2.8 (37.0)	2.7 (36.9)	5.7 (42.3)	10.1 (50.2)	14.7 (58.5)	18.8 (65.8)	20.8 (69.4)	19.9 (67.8)	16.7 (62.1)	11.6 (52.9)	7.3 (45.1)	4.2 (39.6)	11.3 (52.3)
Daily mean °C (°F)	0.6 (33.1)	0.2 (32.4)	2.3 (36.1)	6.1 (43.0)	10.9 (51.6)	14.8 (58.6)	17.3 (63.1)	17 (63)	13.6 (56.5)	8.8 (47.8)	4.8 (40.6)	1.7 (35.1)	8.2 (46.8)
Mean daily minimum °C (°F)	−1.5 (29.3)	−1.7 (28.9)	0.1 (32.2)	3.7 (38.7)	8.2 (46.8)	12.4 (54.3)	14.8 (58.6)	14.2 (57.6)	11.5 (52.7)	7 (45)	3.3 (37.9)	0 (32)	6.0 (42.8)
Source 1: NOAA – WMO averages 91-2020 Norway
Source 2: Seklima (avg highs/lows)

== See also ==
- List of islands of Norway
