= Hans Methlie Michelsen =

Norwegian judge (1920–2014)

Hans Methlie Michelsen (March 29, 1920 – January 31, 2014) was a Norwegian judge.

He was born in Bergen. During the German occupation of Norway he partook in the Norwegian resistance. He was arrested in November 1943, sent to Buchenwald in January 1944, then sent to Sennheim and back to Buchenwald. He was released in December 1944.

He worked as a Supreme Court barrister from 1952, presiding judge in Hålogaland from 1958, Attorney General of Norway from 1962 and Supreme Court Justice from 1972 to 1990.

Civic offices
Preceded by Henning Bødtker	Attorney General of Norway; 1962–1972	Succeeded by Bjørn Haug
