= Thor Willy Ruud Hansen =

Norwegian pediatrician and neonatologist

Thor Willy Ruud Hansen (born 21 December 1946 in Fredrikstad) is a Norwegian pediatrician and neonatologist. He is a Professor of Pediatrics at the University of Oslo and a former President of the Norwegian Society of Pediatricians (2009–2011). He is currently chairman of the clinical ethics committee at Oslo University Hospital. His research interests are neonatal medicine, including the neurotoxicology of neonatal jaundice, as well as clinical ethics.

Hansen earned his cand.med. (MD) at the University of Oslo in 1972 and his dr.med. (Med.Sc.D.) in 1988, and is a specialist in pediatrics. Following residencies at several Norwegian hospitals he worked in Quessua in Angola as the only doctor at small mission hospital 1977–1980. Since 1980 he has worked at Oslo University Hospital, Rikshospitalet (The National Hospital) in Norway, interrupted by two stays in the United States, including as a neonatologist and associate professor at the UPMC Children's Hospital of Pittsburgh 1994–1997. In 1998 he became head of neonatology at The National Hospital in Norway and in 2003 he became a full professor of neonatology at the University of Oslo.

== Honours ==
- Honorary member of the American Pediatric Society
- Honorary doctorate, Bashkir State University, Russia
- King's Medal of Merit, for contributions to pediatrics and clinical ethics (2013)
