= Stråholmen =

Island in Telemark, Norway

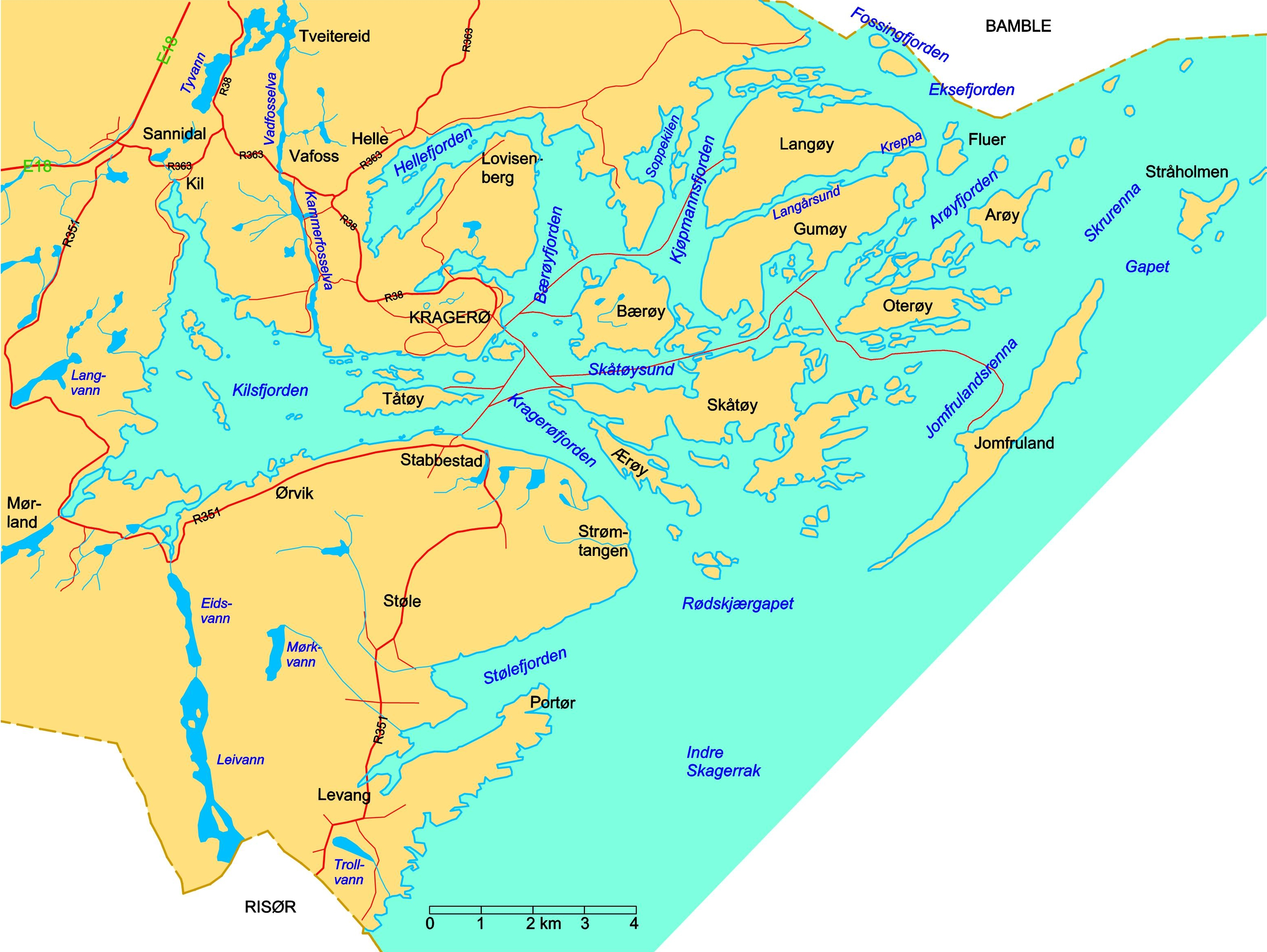
- The island of Stråholmen is off the coast of Kragerø
- Interactive map of the island

Geography
- Location: Telemark, Norway
- Coordinates: 58.89871°N 9.64342°E
- Archipelago: Kragerø
- Area: 56 km^{2} (22 sq mi)
- Length: 1.5 km (0.93 mi)
- Width: 1 km (0.6 mi)
- Coastline: 5.7 km (3.54 mi)

Administration
- Norway
- County: Telemark
- Municipality: Kragerø Municipality

Stråholmen is an island in Kragerø Municipality in Telemark county, Norway. The 56-hectare (140-acre) island lies off the mainland coast approximately 2 kilometres (1.2 mi) to the northeast of the island of Jomfruland. Stråholmen is about 1.5 kilometres (0.93 mi) long and 1 kilometre (0.62 mi) wide at the widest. Stråholmen faces the Skagerrak seas to the east and provides shelter for the inner coastline. The name is Norwegian and literally translates to "The Islet of Straws".

== History and settlement ==
At the center of the island lies a small settlement which today consists of cottages a vacation homes, populated mainly through the summer. The settlement on Stråholmen was originally established by the sailing ship piloting industry of southern Telemark, as the location is ideal for spotting ships arriving from the sea. By the late 1900s, the settlement had lost its economic function, except for some limited agricultural activity. The remnants of the settlement are considered an important part of the cultural heritage from the shipping industry era of the southern Telemark district.

== Facilities and nature ==
On the north side lies a sheltered dock and beach, frequently utilized as a recreation area for the local population and tourists. The dock is accessible by water taxi from nearby Kragerø, Valle (in Bamble Municipality), or Langesund (also in Bamble Municipality), or by private vessel. The central settlement is reachable from the dock by a dirt path.

Stråholmen features several plants and tree types which are quite uncommon in the nearby islands and mainland. These plants and trees were probably imported through seeds in ballast dirt during the shipping era. The island is great for hiking and the surrounding shores are considered good for sports fishing.

The bird life is rich, especially during the migration seasons. Ducks, geese, and wading birds are especially abundant. Part of the island and the surrounding seas are part of Jomfruland National Park.

== See also ==
- List of islands of Norway
