= Jakob Dreyer =

Norwegian printer (1861–1952)

Johan Jakob Rambach Dreyer (29 March 1861 – 15 June 1952) was a Norwegian book printer.

He was born in Stavanger as a son of book printer Paul Terchelsen Dreyer (1819–1908) and Ingeborg Marie Hellern. In 1899 he married ship-owner's daughter Ragna Berg (1871–1938).

He started Dreyers Reproduktionsanstalt in 1897. From 1898 he also owned and ran his father's book print. The company was named Dreyers Grafiske Anstalt from 1937 to 1950, then Dreyer AS from 1950 to 1982. He became known for patenting a method of offset text printing. He was also a consul for Germany since 1931, chair of several local organizations and a benefactor for the Norwegian Ornithological Society.
