= Axel Johannessen =

Norwegian physician, pediatrician and academic

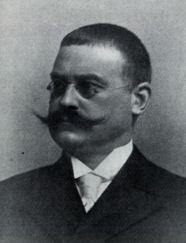
Axel Theodor Johannessen (ca. 1911)

Axel Theodor Johannessen (29 May 1849 – 2 March 1926) was a Norwegian physician, pediatrician, professor at University of Oslo and senior doctor at Rikshospitalet Hospital in Oslo.

== Background ==
He was born in Christiania (now Oslo), Norway. He was the son of Christen Johannessen (1814-1903) and Christine Oline Thorkildsen (1820-1915). He graduated artium in 1866. He was a student at the Royal Frederick University (now University of Oslo) and became a cand.med. in 1875. He followed with a study trip to Germany, Austria and Italy to study infectious diseases based on the new subject of bacteriology.

== Career ==
In 1876 Johannessen moved to Bærum, where he worked as a doctor at Bærums Verk. During 1885–1886, Johannessen studied the occurrence of struma and two years later undertook a trip to hospitals in Germany, the Netherlands, Belgium, France and Denmark to study the treatment of tuberculosis.

In 1891 Johannessen was appointed lecturer in childhood diseases at the University of Kristiania. From 1893 he was also a senior doctor at Rikshospitalet's newly established children's department, and in 1895 he was appointed as a professor in childhood diseases. He was one of the first pediatricians in Norway and founded the discipline of pediatrics at the university. He also founded the Norwegian Society of Pediatricians and served as its president until 1922.

== Personal life ==
In 1876, he married Lina Vedastine Malthe (1849-1926) who was the sister of surgeon Alexander Malthe.

Axel Johannessen was awarded the Crown Prince's Gold Metal (Kronprinsens gullmedalje) by the University of Oslo in 1882. He received the Order of St. Olav (Knight First Class) in 1907 .
