= Peter Collett (judge) =

Norwegian judge, businessman and property owner

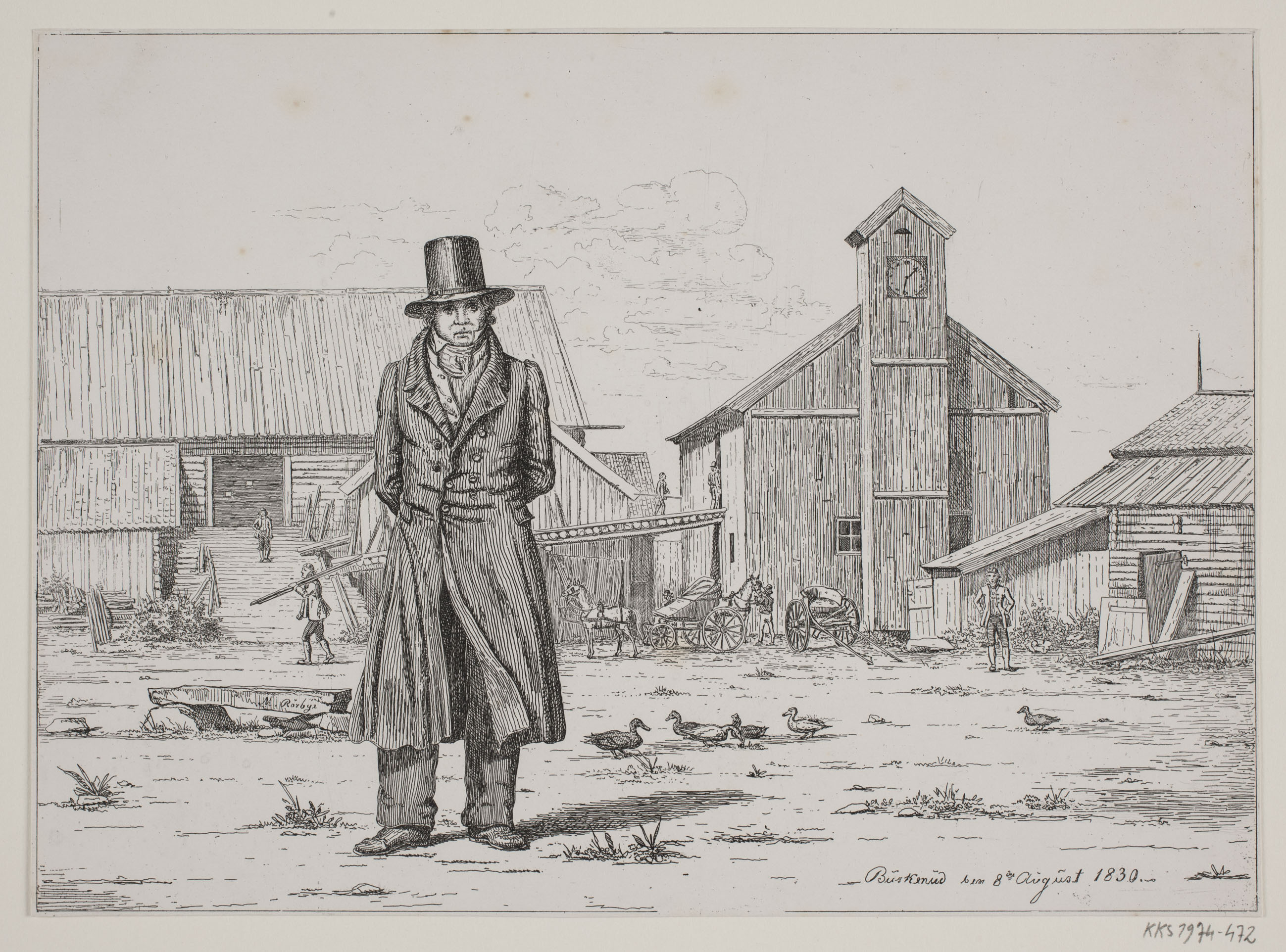
Peter Collett.

Peter Collett (8 August 1766 – 27 July 1836) was a Norwegian judge, businessman and property owner.

Peter Collett was born at Modum in Buskerud, Norway. He was the eldest son of landowner Peter Collett (1740–1786) and his first wife Kirstine Holmboe (1745–1768). He was a brother of Christian Ancher Collett and Anne Cathrine Collett. He grew up on his father's estate at Buskerud Manor (Buskerud Hovedgård). From 1784 to 1785, Collett attended the Christiania Cathedral School. During 1788, he studied law at the University of Copenhagen.

In August 1794 he married vicar's daughter Eilertine Severine Bendeke (1777–1857). They were the parents of eleven children including Bernt Anker Collet. He was the grandfather of Albert Collett, great-grandfather of Emil Collett and 5x great-grandfather of Karl-Johan Persson.

Peter Collett was an assessor in the diocesan court of Akershus from 1802 to 1814. He served as a judge on the bench of the Supreme Court of Norway from 1814 to 1830. In 1818, Collett was the delegate from Buskerud at the coronation of King Charles XIV John of Sweden. In 1800, he took over Buskerud Manor from his stepmother, Johanne Henrikke Ancher (1750-1818). In 1809, he bought Hassel Iron Works (Hassel Jernværk) at Skotselv in Øvre Eiker. Collett stopped iron production in 1835.

== See also ==
- Collett family
