= Fram 2 =

Fram 2 may refer to:

- Fram2, a crewed Earth-polar-orbit space mission aboard a SpaceX Dragon2 Crew Dragon, flown in 2025, the first ever, manned, polar-orbit, space mission
- IF Fram 2 (Idrettsforeningen Fram 2), the "2. divisjon" reserve soccer team for 'IF (Sports Association) Fram 1' (Fram Larvik), a Norwegian soccer club in Larvik
- FRAM-2, a mounting position on the International Space Station for storage on the external stowage platform
- FRAM II, U.S. Navy Fleet Rehabilitation and Modernization 2 program

== See also ==
- Fram (disambiguation)
