= St. Hallvard's Church and Monastery =

- St. Hallvard kirke og kloster
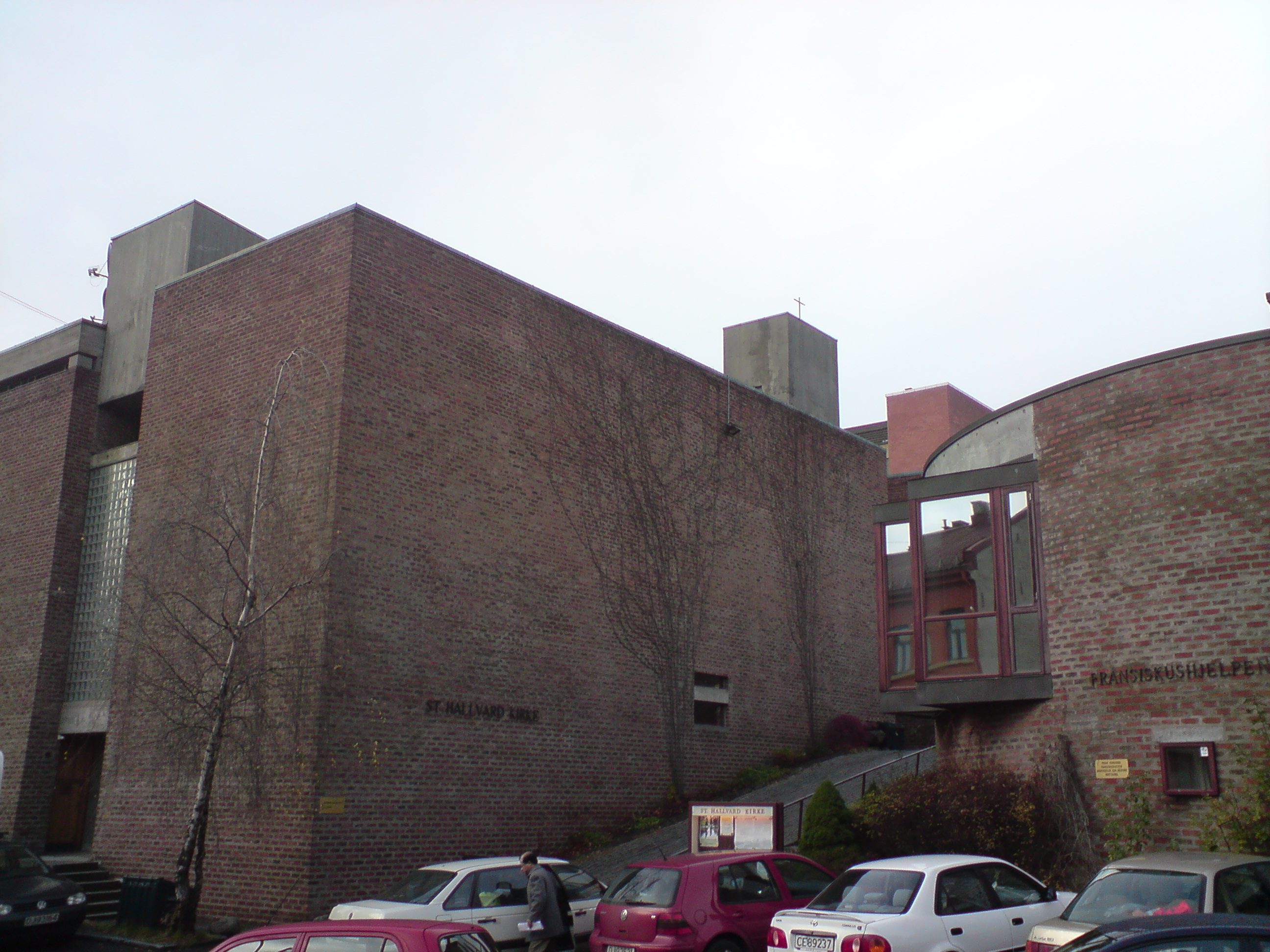
- St. Hallvard's Church and Monastery
- 59°54′45.55″N 10°46′8.72″E
- Location: Enerhauggata 4 Oslo
- Country: Norway
- Denomination: Roman Catholic
- Website: St. Hallvard (in Norwegian)

History
- Status: Parish Church
- Dedication: Saint Hallvard
- Consecrated: 1966

Architecture
- Functional status: Active

Administration
- Diocese: Oslo
- Parish: St. Hallvard

Clergy
- Bishop: Bernt Ivar Eidsvig

St. Hallvard's Church and Monastery (Norwegian: St. Hallvard kirke og kloster) on Enerhaugen in Oslo, Norway, not far from the former medieval St. Hallvard's Cathedral, is the location of the largest current parish of the Catholic Church in Norway. The Catholic parish church for eastern Oslo, it was run by the Franciscans until 1 September 2008.

== Architecture ==
St. Hallvard's monastery and church in Oslo, designed by the architects Lund & Slaatto, has three sections: the monastery, parish offices, and the church, surrounding a circular central nave. The building has three levels, built of brick and concrete exposed both to the interior and exterior.

The church attracted much attention in academic circles when it was completed in 1966 and won several architectural awards. From the outside the building is square, stern and introspective. But in the heart of building where the church is located, it is circular and packed into the square monastery building. The roof of the church room hangs down and gives the lowest height where it is traditionally highest.

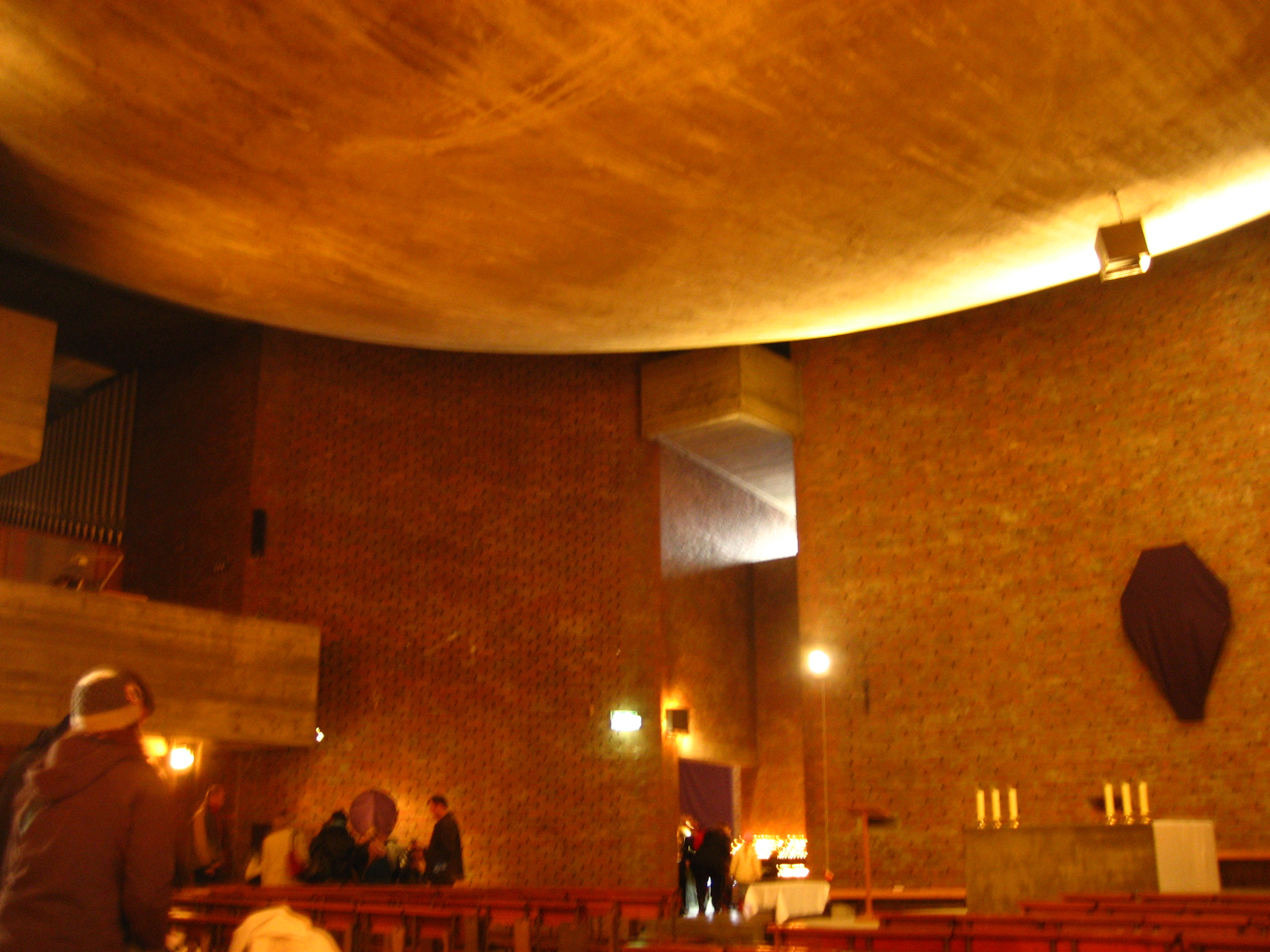
Interior from the church. Church organ above to the left.

In the adjacent, rectangular Santa Maria chapel the sacraments are preserved.

The monastery has a chancery, living rooms and cells. It is now being converted into apartments for Catholic priests.

The parish office section has a vestry, offices for Fransiskushjelpen, a reading room and a meeting room.
