= Firma Albert Collett =

Norwegian forestry, real estate and power company

Firma Albert Collett ANS is a company that operates in forestry, estate management, and hydroelectric power production.

== Operations ==
It owns 570 square kilometers (220 sq mi) of estate in Namsos Municipality and Nærøysund Municipality in the northern part of Trøndelag county, Norway. The company operates four power stations with a combined power production of 8 megawatts (11,000 hp) and an average annual energy production of 60 gigawatt-hours (220 TJ). It operates 120 square kilometers (46 sq mi) of productive forest, as well as agriculture and wilderness management, such as hunting and fishing.

== History ==
In 1860, privileges for the forestry were abolished, and Salsbrukets Interessentselskab was given access to Salsgodset, a 418-square-kilometer (161 sq mi) along the lake Salsvatnet in the estate Fosnes Municipality. Five years later, Albert Petter Severin Collett, aged 23, moved to Salsbruket as a representatives for Christiania Bank og Kredittkasse. Salsbrukets Interessentselskab was nearly bankrupt. Collett took over the company in 1871, and at the same time bought several other estates in the area, in the then-municipalities of Kolvereid and Foldereid. Collett's company started purchasing part of Bangdalens Interessentselskab, which owned estates in Klinga, Stod, Kvam and Namdalseid. By 1894, Collett had bought the entire company. All sawmill activities were concentrated to Bangsund in 1898; however, in 1905, a pulp mill was built in Salsbruket, which established the economic foundation for the village.

After Albert Collett, the company was taken over by his sons Johan (b. 1874), Oscar (b. 1877) and Axel (b. 1880). In 1980, Bangsundbruket was sold to the state. On 25 October 1985, the pulp mill in Salsbruket burned down and was not rebuilt.
