= Fram (name) =

Fram is both a surname and a masculine given name. Notable people with the name include:

== Surname ==
- Bree Fram, American military officer and engineer
- Edward M. Fram (1905–1955), Christian Iraqi businessman, merchant and philanthropist
- Jason Fram (born 1995), Chinese ice hockey player
- Leslie Fram, American media executive
- Diana Fram Edulji, Indian cricketer

== Given name ==
- Fram Farrington (1908–2002), polar explorer
