= Henning Bødtker =

Norwegian jurist and civil servant (1891–1975)

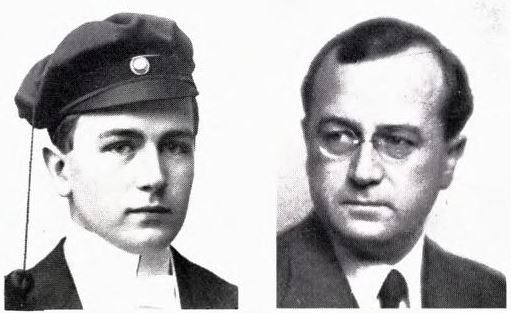
- Born: 14 August 1891; Svelvik, Norway
- Died: 19 November 1975 (aged 84)
- Occupations: Jurist and civil servant

Henning Bremer Bødtker (14 August 1891 – 19 November 1975) was a Norwegian jurist and civil servant. He was the Attorney General of Norway from 1945 to 1962.

== Personal life ==
He was born in Svelvik as a son of ship captain Jacob Bødtker (1847–1923) and Hilda Tofte (1853–1943). He is a second cousin of professor Adam Trampe Bødtker.

In 1922 he married Swedish citizen Dagmar von Sydow. Their daughter who was also named Dagmar married landowner and politician Carl Oscar Collett.

== Career ==
He finished his secondary education in 1909 and graduated from the Royal Frederick University with the cand.jur. degree in 1913. He was a law clerk and junior solicitor from 1914 to 1918, and also chaired the Norwegian Students' Society in 1916.

From 1919 he was a practising lawyer in Oslo. He worked as a secretary for the Norwegian Bar Association from 1929 to 1937, also editing Norsk Sakførerblad for the last six years. He became a board member in the Norwegian Bar Association in 1938 and chaired the organization from 1940 to 1947. During the occupation of Norway by Nazi Germany he was imprisoned in Møllergata 19 from 12 June 1941, then in Grini concentration camp from 12 September 1941 to 4 September 1942. He had endeavored to keep the Norwegian Bar Association from being usurped by the Nazis. His organization was one of forty-three to protest Nazification attempts on 15 May 1941, in a letter addressed directly to Reichskommissar Josef Terboven. This protest of the 43 was met with harsh reactions; already on 12 June 1941 arrest orders were issued on Bødtker and fellow signatory Erling Steen. On 18 June six more protesters were arrested.

== Post-war career ==
After the war he served as the Attorney General of Norway from 1945 to 1962. He chaired the committees that oversaw the transition to peacetime of Nortraship between 1945 and 1946, and then the Norwegian whaling fleet between 1946 and 1947.

He was also the auditor of the Norwegian Nobel Committee from 1946 (auditing the year 1945) to 1972. He chaired Fellesbanken from 1945 to 1964 and Foreningen Norden in Norway from 1950 to 1956, was a board member of the companies Norsk Kulelager and Norsk Trelleborg Gummi.

He received the King's Medal of Merit in gold and was decorated as a Commander of the Order of St. Olav (1955), the Order of the Dannebrog, the Order of the White Rose of Finland and the Order of the Polar Star. He died in 1975 and was buried at Ris.

Cultural offices
Preceded by Fredrik Lange-Nielsen	Chairman of the Norwegian Students' Society; 1916 (autumn)	Succeeded by Otto Lous Mohr
Preceded by Harald Grieg	Chairman of Foreningen Norden in Norway; 1950-1956	Succeeded by Nils Langhelle
Legal offices
Preceded by	Chairman of the Norwegian Bar Association; 1940–1947	Succeeded by
Preceded by Valentin Voss	Attorney General of Norway; 1945–1962	Succeeded by Hans Methlie Michelsen
