= Johan Collett (1874–1969) =

Norwegian businessman (1874–1969)

Johan Collett (22 November 1874 – 2 June 1969) was a Norwegian businessperson.

== Personal life ==
He was born in Trondhjem as a son of Albert Peter Severin Collett (1842–1896) and Nanna Høegh (1854–1921). He was a brother of physician Arthur Collett and chemist Emil Collett.

He married three times. First to ship-owner's daughter Ellen Eger from 1903, but the marriage was dissolved. His second wife was director's daughter Kathleen Ragnhild Falsen, after dissolving this marriage as well he married Rosa Louise Martens in 1943. Falsen went on to marry Erling Steen.

== Career ==
He graduated from Kristiania Commerce School in 1893, and took further commercial education in England and France. When his father died in 1896, at 22 years Johan Collett took over the estates Bangdalsbruket and Salsbruket. The company was run under the name Firma Albert Collett, from 1909 with Johan's brothers Oscar and Axel as co-owners.

He was a board member of Norsk Træmassekompani, the Paper and Fibre Research Institute and the cartel Mechanical Pulp Suppliers. He was a supervisory council member of Christiania Theater, Foreningen Norden and Forsikringsselskapet Viking. In sports, he was a chairman of the golf club Oslo GK for many years. He became a member of the gentlemen's skiing club SK Fram in 1902, and was proclaimed a lifetime member in 1964.

He was decorated as a Knight of the Order of St. Olav in 1951. He died in 1969 and was buried at Vestre gravlund.
