= Fransiskushjelpen =

Norwegian charitable organisation

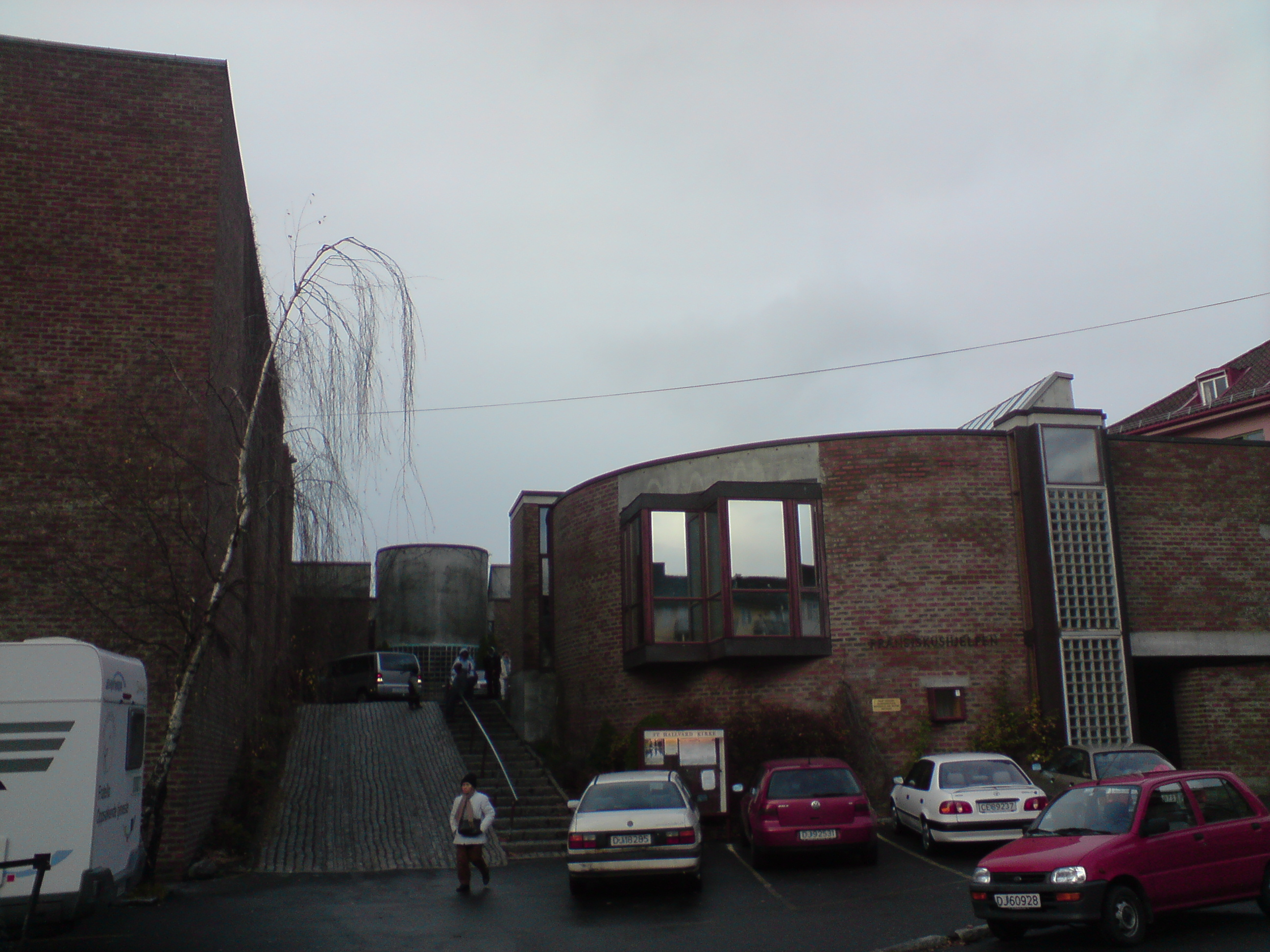
Fransiskushjelpen administrative offices (at right)

Fransiskushjelpen is a Catholic charitable organisation in Norway, founded in by Brita Collett Paus in 1956. Its administration headquarters are in Oslo, at St. Hallvard's Church and Monastery.

The organisation, connected to the Franciscan order, provide help to the seriously ill and dying people and to people in need, regardless of religious beliefs.

== See also ==
- Catholic Charities
