= Nordic Orthopaedic Federation =

Medical association in northern Europe

The Nordic Orthopaedic Federation is the orthopaedic federation for the Nordic and other Northern European countries. It was founded 1919. The current president is Richard Wallensten of Karolinska University Hospital. Member countries were Denmark, The Netherlands, Estonia, Finland, Iceland, Lithuania, Norway and Sweden as of June 2021.

The federation consists of the following national orthopaedic associations:

- Danish Orthopaedic Society
- Finnish Orthopaedic Association
- Icelandic Orthopaedic Society
- Norwegian Orthopaedic Association
- Swedish Orthopaedic Association
- Dutch Orthopaedic Association
- Estonian Orthopaedic Society
