= Skogbrukets Landsforening =

Norwegian employers' organization

The Skogbrukets Landsforening (National Forestry Association) (Norwegian: Skogbrukets Landsforening, SL) is a prominent employers' organization in Norway, operating under the umbrella of the Confederation of Norwegian Enterprise. Founded in 1928 as the Skogbrukets Arbeidsgiverforening., it has played a significant role in representing the interests of the forestry sector in Norway for nearly a century.

The organization's primary focus is on advocating for the interests of forestry employers, which include forest owners, logging companies, and related industries. Its activities encompass a wide range of areas crucial to the forestry sector, such as labor relations, industry regulations, environmental policies, and sustainable forestry practices.
