= Norwegian Ornithological Society =

Norwegian nature conservation organisation

The Norwegian Ornithological Society (Norwegian: Norsk Ornitologisk Forening, NOF) is a Norwegian bird study and conservation organisation.

It was founded in 1957, though it was preceded by a similar body with the same name which operated from 1920 to 1935. It is BirdLife International’s Norwegian partner organisation. Key activities of the society include the protection of bird habitats, running conservation projects, educating the public and publishing membership magazines. It has about 9000 members and four staff and is based in Trondheim.
