= SK Fram (Oslo) =

Norwegian skiing club

Skiklubben Fram was a Norwegian skiing club, based in Oslo but with its sporting facilities in Vestre Aker—and from 1902 to 1923 in Oppland. Fram was founded in 1889, and after a down period around 1900 it was refurbished as an exclusive gentlemen's social club in a skiing setting.

== Early years, 1889–c.1900 ==
The club was founded on 24 November 1889 at Framnæs near Skillebekk, whence the Fearnley family had moved here the same year. The club was named after the property and is thus one of very few Norwegian sports clubs named Fram not to derive its name from Nansen's vessel. The founders were ten young boys; Harald Andresen, N. O. Young Fearnley, Thomas Fearnley, Jr., Jens P. Heyerdahl, Waldemar Kallevig, Gerhard Kallevig, William Schiøtt, Johs Schiøtt, Søren Christian Sommerfelt and Sverre Smith (died in 1892). Sommerfelt served as the first chairman. A few new members were admitted before the turn of the century; Barthold A. Butenschøn, Sr. and Oscar Collett in 1890, Giert Giertsen and August Walle-Hansen in 1891, Westye Parr Egeberg in 1895 and Fritz Mowinckel in 1898. August Walle-Hansen became the second chairman in 1895, succeeding Sommerfelt.

Fram participated in skiing contests while the boys were in school. Jens P. Heyerdahl was the most skilled member, but none of Fram's members competed at a high international level. The club did draft some skilled skiers in the 1890s, but their tenure as club members was short. Its closest rival club was SK Ondur. The somewhat older skiing clubs Christiania SK, SK Ull and SK Skuld were similar in structure to both Fram and Ondur, but attracted people from an older age segment. Christiania SK was the outspoken ideal of the Fram founders, as this club had achieved sporting success and already owned its own skiing cabin in Nordmarka. Fram rented cabin space at Øvre Tangen from 1893, thus becoming neighbors with Ondur, but in 1895 they acquired their own cabin near the lake Skjennungen. A cabin was designed by architect von Hanno, built downtown and then transported to the lakeside. The nearby hills Fossekneika and Skjennungsbakken were used for ski jumping.

The club badge is circular, encapsulating the word Fram as well as a ski, a knapsack and a torch. It was designed by Kristofer Sinding-Larsen.

== 1902–1945 ==
After the base of club founders left the city to take higher education, activity dwindled, and the cabin was sold. In 1902 the club was revived and a new cabin, Framhytten, erected near Harestuvannet in Oppland. The skiing activities of Fram were resumed, but more noticeably Fram evolved into an exclusive gentlemen's club, with a maximum of 25 members according to the by-laws. By 1914 it did not even fill its quota; with the club having 22 members. In addition to seven of the founding members and all the five members admitted in the 1890s, the members were Anders Beer, Johan Collett, Einar Westye Egeberg, Jr., Johan Heiberg, Carlos Jakhelln, Otto Nyquist, Herbert Plahte, Viktor Plahte and Thor Thoresen. Fram also nurtured close ties to the Swedish royal family while Norway was subject to a personal union with its neighbor country. Fram elected the Swedish princes Gustav Adolf and Vilhelm as honorary members in 1904, the year before Norway decided to abolish the personal union.

Thomas Fearnley served as chairman from 1901 to 1904. Westye Parr Egeberg then served from 1905 to 1915, interrupted for one year by Jens P. Heyerdahl. Thomas Fearnley took over the chair in 1915 and sat until 1960. He was succeeded by Arne Meidell, who died in 1963; Johannes Brun took over. Known deputy chairmen were Westye Parr Egeberg from 1924 to 1959, Arne Meidell from 1959 to 1960, Johannes Brun from 1960 to 1963 and Einar Trumpy from 1963.

In 1922 Fram left its premises in Oppland and bought a cabin near Svartor. The cabin was designed by Thorvald Astrup, and inaugurated on 20 December 1923. Large proprietor Harald Løvenskiold was invited as a guest, and the first Løvenskiold family member (Carl) had joined Fram in 1922.

== Fram after 1945 ==
By 1964, the club had shed its last traces of being a competitive skiing club, and had become a gentlemen's social club. The members ranged in age from 47 to 90. The last living founder, Jens P. Heyerdahl, died in 1970. Fram steadily accepted new members, and in 1961 it was decided to incorporate the club Dovre into Fram, with Dovre's members entering Fram successively over a four-year period.
