= Anders Beer (engineer) =

Norwegian businessman

Anders Beer (8 July 1875 – 1957) was a Norwegian businessperson.

He was born in Kristiania. He spent his career as chief executive of the stonemasonry company N. S. Beer & Co, founded by his father Nicolai Sivert Beer in 1879. The company was a major global exporter of pavement stones globally. The company later changed its name to Beer Sten in 1989. The company was later passed down to the next generation (Gerhard Beer), then the next after that (Anders Beer, Jr.). He was also a supervisory council of Forsikringsselskapet Viking. He was a member of the gentlemen's skiing club SK Fram since 1906. He died in 1957 and was buried in Ullern.
