= Fram (bicycle company) =

Swedish bicycle company

Fram (Swedish for Front or Forward) was a Swedish bicycle manufacturer. Fram dated back to 1897 and was manufactured in Uppsala, Sweden until the early 1970s . The company B. Bernh. Oberg & Co. was founded by Bernhard Oberg in 1897 and began manufacturing bicycles similar to competitor Nyman companies . The name probably came from Fridtjof Nansen's ship of the same name. In 1905 took over the production of AB Josef Eriksson's Bicycle Factory (later AB Joseph Erickson).

In 1932 the company was purchased by the Industrial Company of Helsingborg, which manufactured King bike brand. In 1955 the company changed its name to the bicycle factory Fram. Two years later made it a three-wheel micromobile, as final assembly factory in Helsingborg, but demand was poor. Instead it was for some time sales agents for the German three-wheelers Messerschmitt and Heinkel. In 1973 production was moved almost entirely to Helsingborg.

The bikes now being called Front-King, and faded away completely during the 1980s. Bernhard Oberg & Co. had offices at Svartbäcksgatan 14 Uppsala. Josef Eriksson came to take over a team building at Österplan which the factory was to last from 1917 until 1960 when a new facility at Verkstadsgatan 8 Bolandsområdet near Uppsala was introduced. After that the production left Verkstadsgatan came some frame parts that are produced during a period in Wellington near Uppsala.

The old factory building, or "Joffe" as it was called, at Österplan remains and now houses theater operations. Likewise is the more modern factory building at Verkstadsgatan eight remaining houses and engineering companies.

Monark Crescent, who took over Fram-King in the early 1980s, has occasionally used King brand name. However, the Fram brand name belongs to history.
