= Christian Ancher Collett =

Norwegian engineer, architect, and building inspector

Christian Ancher Collett (30 April 1771 – 10 January 1833) was a Norwegian engineer, architect, and building inspector.

He was born as the oldest child of Peter Collett and Johanne Henriche Ancher. He had two older half-siblings, Peter Collett and Anne Cathrine Collett, as well as eight younger siblings, one of whom died before reaching the age of one.

He married Anna Karine Bie (1775–1856). The couple had five children. Their daughter Johanne Benedicte married Peder Christian Hersleb Kjerschow, bishop of the diocese of Bjørgvin. Through this marriage Christian Ancher Collett had the great-grandson Christian Michelsen, statesman and Prime Minister of Norway.

An engineer, Christian Ancher Collett was a director of Kongsberg Silver Mines. In 1816 King Charles II appointed him as a consultant (Statlig bygningsinspektør) to manage the royal buildings around Christiania. The construction of the Royal Palace commenced during this period. He held this position until his death in 1833, and was succeeded by Christian Heinrich Grosch. The position is considered the predecessor of the government agency Statsbygg.

An architect, Collett was hired by Niels Aall to design the family's summer residence, Ulefos Manor, Ulefoss (Ulefos Hovedgaard). Collett did so in collaboration with Jørgen Henrich Rawert, completing construction in 1807. Influenced by Aall's time studying abroad, the manor is Empire-style, drawing inspiration from Andrea Palladio's La Rotonda.

Preceded by position created	Royal Building Inspector; 1816–1833	Succeeded by Christian Heinrich Grosch
