= Trygve Utheim =

Norwegian jurist and politician

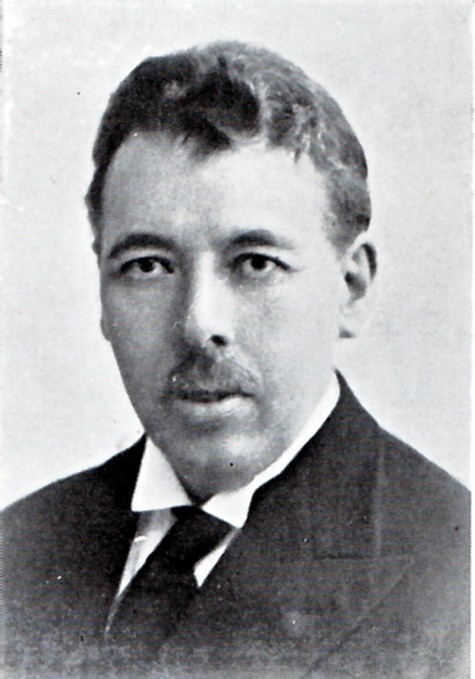
Trygve Utheim

Trygve Utheim (16 September 1884 – 15 June 1952) was a Norwegian jurist and politician for the Liberal Party. He was the Norwegian Minister of Social Affairs from 1933 to 1935.

Utheim became Candidate of Law in 1907. In 1920, he became head of an office (byråsjef) in the Ministry of Justice and Public Security. He was county governor of Møre og Romsdal from 1928 to 1952, but on leave 1933-35 when he served as minister and again from 1945 when he became a member of the Parlimanent for the Liberal Party. He died in 1952.
