= Buskerud Manor =

Estate in Buskerud, Norway

Coordinates: 59°52′55″N 9°53′27″E

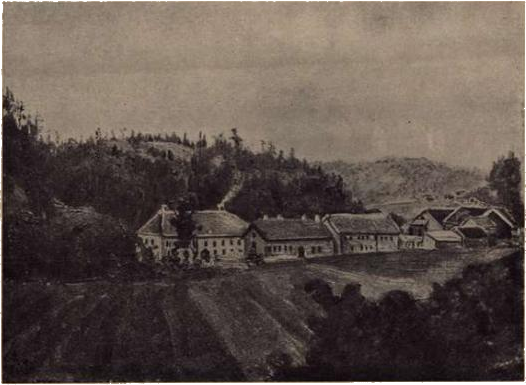
The Buskerud farm in the late 1860s. Painting by county engineer Captain Anton M. Bergh.

Buskerud Manor (Norwegian: Buskerud hovedgård or Buskerud gård på Modum) was a former estate and manor located on a large farm in Buskerud county, Norway. The modern county of Buskerud is named for the estate.

== History ==
The farm was located on the west side of Drammenselva at Aamot in what is now Modum Municipality. During the Middle Ages, the property was operated by the Diocese of Hamar. Buskerud was a monastic estate until 1536. After the Protestant Reformation, it was the residence of officers of the king's army. From 1762, it was owned by members of the Collett family, including supreme court justice Peter Collett. The main building was built in 1755 and rebuilt by landowner Peter Collett (1740–1786) after he acquired the property in 1763. The estate had tax exemption, as if it was a noble estate, until it was lifted in a Supreme Court ruling in 1837. Members of the Collett family were owners until 1884.

Buskerud county purchased the farm in 1910 and the former manor was operated as Buskerud Agricultural School (Buskerud landbruksskole). Only the main building was preserved. The property is now the site of Rosthaug High School (Rosthaug videregående skole), which first opened in 1981.
