= Norwegian Society of Pediatricians =

The Norwegian Society of Pediatricians (Norwegian: Norsk barnelegeforening) is the Norwegian association of pediatricians.

The society was founded in 1919 by Axel Johannessen, the first professor of pediatrics in Norway. The society was originally named the Norwegian Pediatric Society (Norwegian: Norsk Pediatrisk Selskap), and was an independent association from its establishment. In 1928 it formally became a specialist association within the Norwegian Medical Association.

As of 2012, the society had 845 members, including 593 certified specialists in pediatrics. The society's journal is called Paidos – Journal of the Norwegian Society of Pediatricians (παιδός paidos is genitive of Greek παῖς país, child), and was established in 1983.

== Chairmen ==
- Axel Johannessen 1919 - 1922
- Chr. Døderlein 1923 - 1924
- Th. Frølich 1925 - 1926
- Chr. Johannessen 1927 - 1928
- R. Tschudi 1929 - 1930
- Arthur Collett 1931 - 1932
- Alex Brinchmann 1933 - 1934
- K. Utheim Toverud 1935 - 1936
- E. Ziesler 1937 - 1938
- L. Stoltenberg 1939 - 1940
- L. Salomonsen 1941 -
- ...
- Arne Njå 1951
- Jens Marstrander
- Martin Fredrik Seip 1960-1962
- ...
- Sverre O. Lie 1979
- Oddmund Søvik
- Jon Steen-Johnsen 1984–1985
- Karl W. Wefring 1989
- Jon Lunde -1999
- Gro Flatabø Zanussi 1999-2001
- Hans Jacob Bangstad 2001-2003
- Jørgen Hurum 2003-2005
- Leif Brunvand 2005-2007
- Kristin Hodnekvam 2007-2009
- Thor Willy Ruud Hansen 2009-2011
- Marianne Nordhov 2011-
