= Salsbruket =

Village in Nærøysund Municipality, Norway

- Village
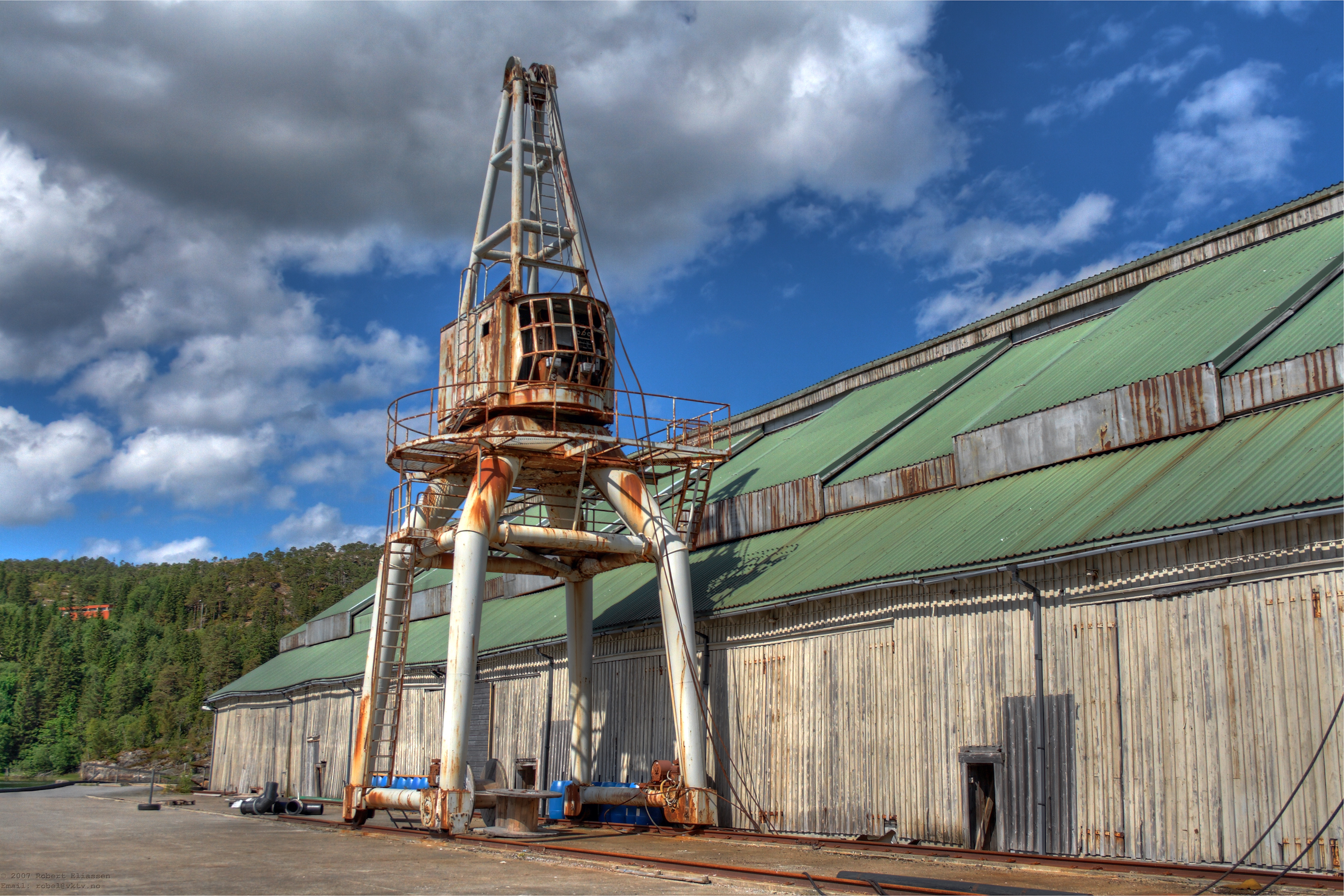
- View of the old lumber mill
- Interactive map of Salsbruket
- Location within Trøndelag Location within Norway
- Coordinates: 64.8008°N 11.8639°E
- Country: Norway
- Region: Central Norway
- County: Trøndelag
- District: Namdalen
- Municipality: Nærøysund Municipality
- Elevation: 7 m (23 ft)
- Time zone: UTC+01:00 (CET)
  - Summer (DST): UTC+02:00 (CEST)
- Post Code: 7960 Salsbruket

Salsbruket is a village in Nærøysund Municipality in Trøndelag county, Norway. The village is located at the end of the Oppløyfjorden, at the mouth of the river Oppløyelva. A sawmill lies in the eastern part of the village, the Oplø area in the center, and Langnes in the western part of the village. Salsbruket Chapel is located in the central part of Oplø.

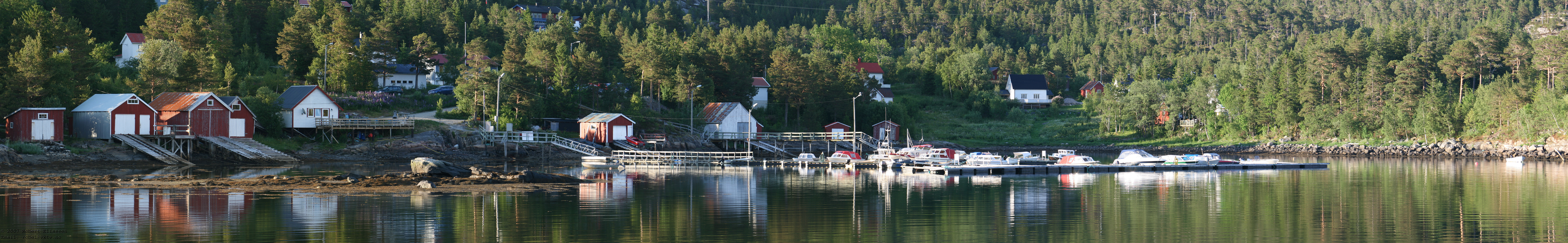
Langnes Harbor
