= Arthur Collett =

Arthur Collett (8 May 1879 – 2 August 1968) was a Norwegian pediatrician and President of the Norwegian Pediatric Society.

== Background ==
He was born in Trondhjem a son of estate owner Albert Collett and Nanna Høegh. In 1912, he married Baroness Ingeborg Wedel-Jarlsberg, daughter of estate owner Baron Carl Gustav Wedel-Jarlsberg of Atlungstad and Amalie Thomine Michelet.

== Career ==
Arthur Collett graduated as a medical doctor at the Royal Frederick University in 1905 and was conferred the dr.med. (D.Sc.) degree in 1920, with the thesis Om urinveisinfektion i barnealderen. Early in his career, he was district physician in Modum and deputy consultant in pediatrics at the National Hospital 1911–1915. He had a private practice in Christiania (Oslo) from 1911. He was also head school physician in Oslo from 1920.

He published several scientific works on pediatric topics, such as infant mortality, child care and infant care, including as an expert for the League of Nations.

He was a board member of the Norwegian Pediatric Society from its establishment in 1919, and became Vice President in 1923 and was President 1931–1932. He was also President of the Norwegian Association for the Promotion of Relief and Assistance to Children from 1924 and Vice President of the Norwegian Child Welfare Council from 1927. He was also a member of the school board in Oslo from 1926. He was editor of Sundhetsbladet from 1934.

He was an honorary member of the Norwegian Pediatric Society (1959).
