= Emil Collett =

Norwegian chemist and entrepreneur

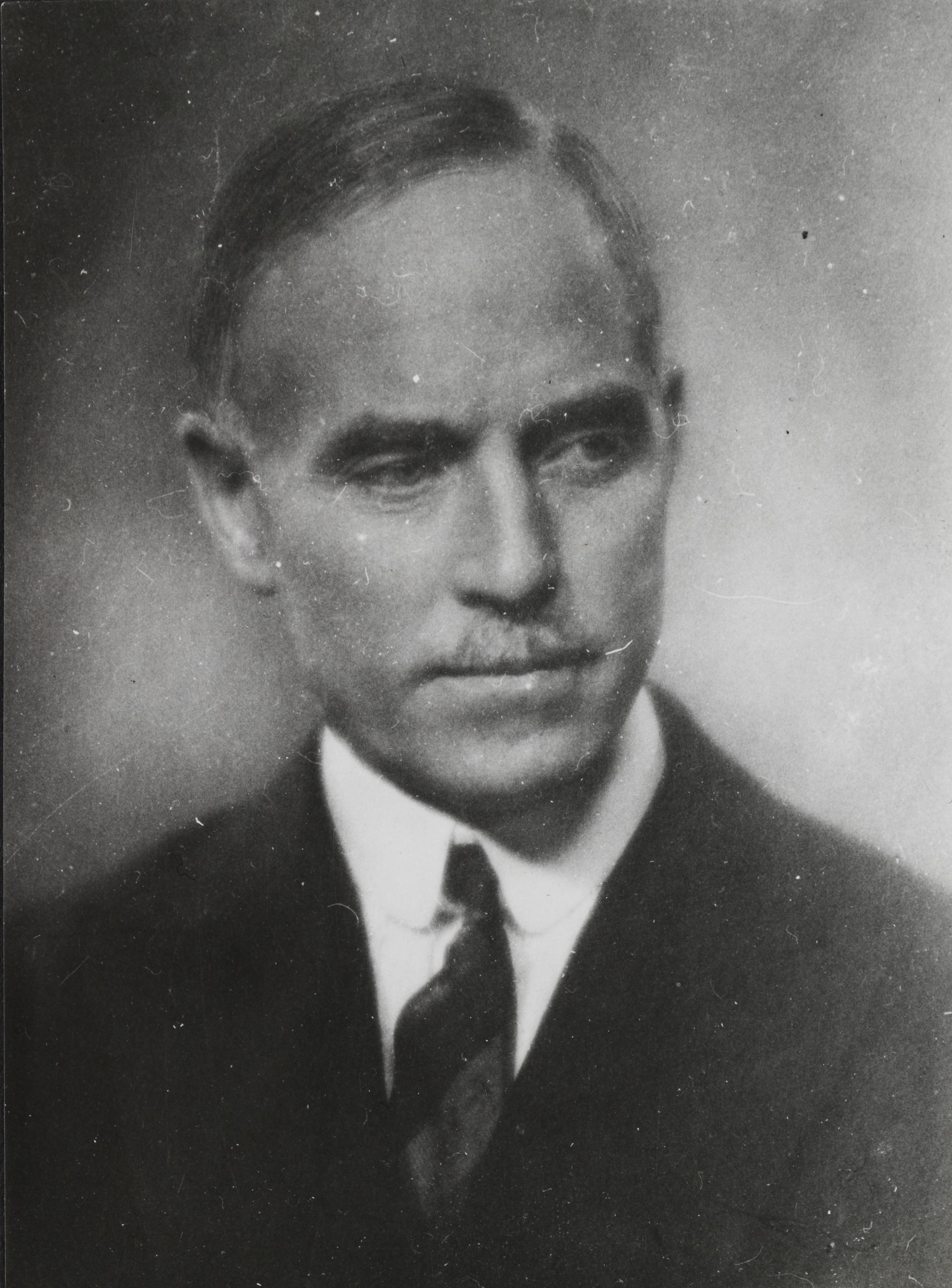
Emil Collett

Emil Collett (22 December 1875 – 9 June 1940) was a Norwegian chemist and entrepreneur.

He graduated from the Norwegian Military Academy as an officer in 1895 and studied chemistry in Berlin, obtaining a doctorate in 1903. With Sam Eyde, he founded Elektrokjemisk A/S i 1904. He then served as director of Notodden Salpeterverk A/S, head of Norsk Hydro's research department and director at Norsk Aluminium Company A/S. In 1933, he founded Collett & Co. with his brother Ove Collett, and their main product was Sana-Sol.

A member of the Collett family, he was the son of landowner Albert Collett, and was married to Gudrun Collett.

In 1930, he received the French Legion of Honour.
