= Høvdingsgård =

Manor house in Vordingborg, Denmark

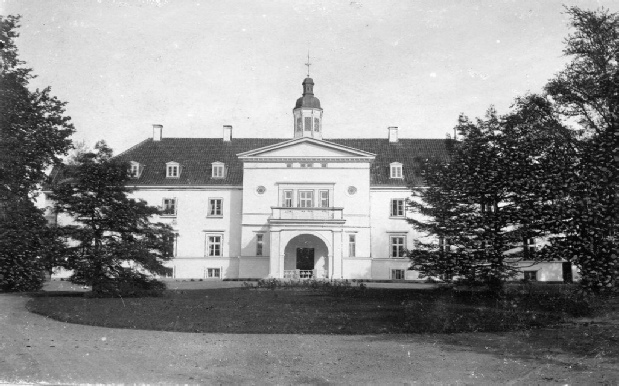
- The main building after the expansion in 1901
- Interactive map of the Høvdingsgård area

General information
- Architectural style: Late Neoclassical
- Location: Kalvehavevej 29; 4735 Mern, Denmark
- Coordinates: 55°2′17″N 12°5′3″E
- Completed: 1852

Design and construction
- Architect: Vilhelm Theodor Walther

Høvdingsgård is a manor house and estate located just east of Mern, Vordingborg Municipality, Denmark. The Late Neoclassical, two-storey main building is from 1852 but was widened in 1901. Anders Lassen, the only non-Commonwealth recipient of the British Victoria Cross in the Second World War, was born on the estate in 1920.

== History ==
=== 17th and 18th century ===
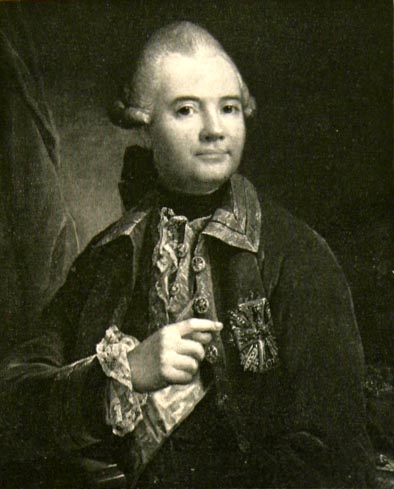
Hans Gustav Lillienskiold

Almost nothing is known about the early history of the estate. In the beginning of the 17th century, it was referred to as Høvdingshus. It was a relatively small manor, owned by the Crown. In 1719, it was included in Vordingborg Cavalry District. Høvdingsgaard was the largest of the 77 farms in the Parish of Mern. It was used as the seat of the local chief forester. The buildings had a total length of 50 window bays at that time.

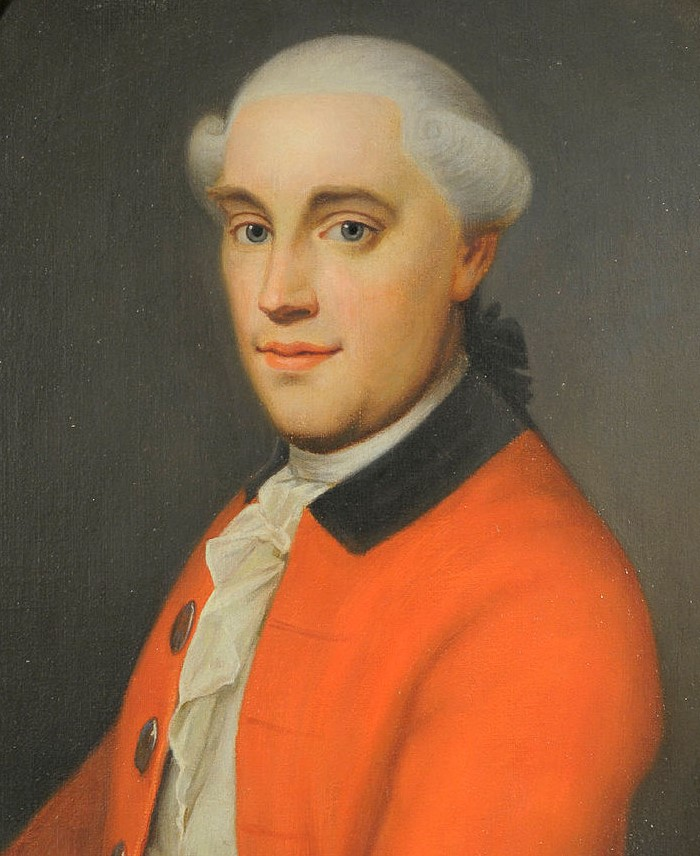
Niels Lunde Reiersen

In 1769, it was decided to sell Vordingborg Cavalry District. In 1774, it was finally divided into 12 estates and sold at auction. The auction took place at Vordingborg Castle on 27 September. Two of the estates, No. 10 and No. 11, were bought by Hans Gustav Lillienskiold. One of them kept the name Høvdingshus and the other one was given the name Lilliendal. Much of the land was leased by Peder Neergaard from Billeborg at Herfølge.

In 1785, Lillienskiold sold both estates to the wealthy merchant Niels Lunde Reiersen from Copenhagen. He was already the owner of Nysø, Jungshoved and Oremandsgaard. The two new estates consolidated his status as one of the largest landowners on Southern Zealand. He died unmarried in 1795.

=== 19th century ===
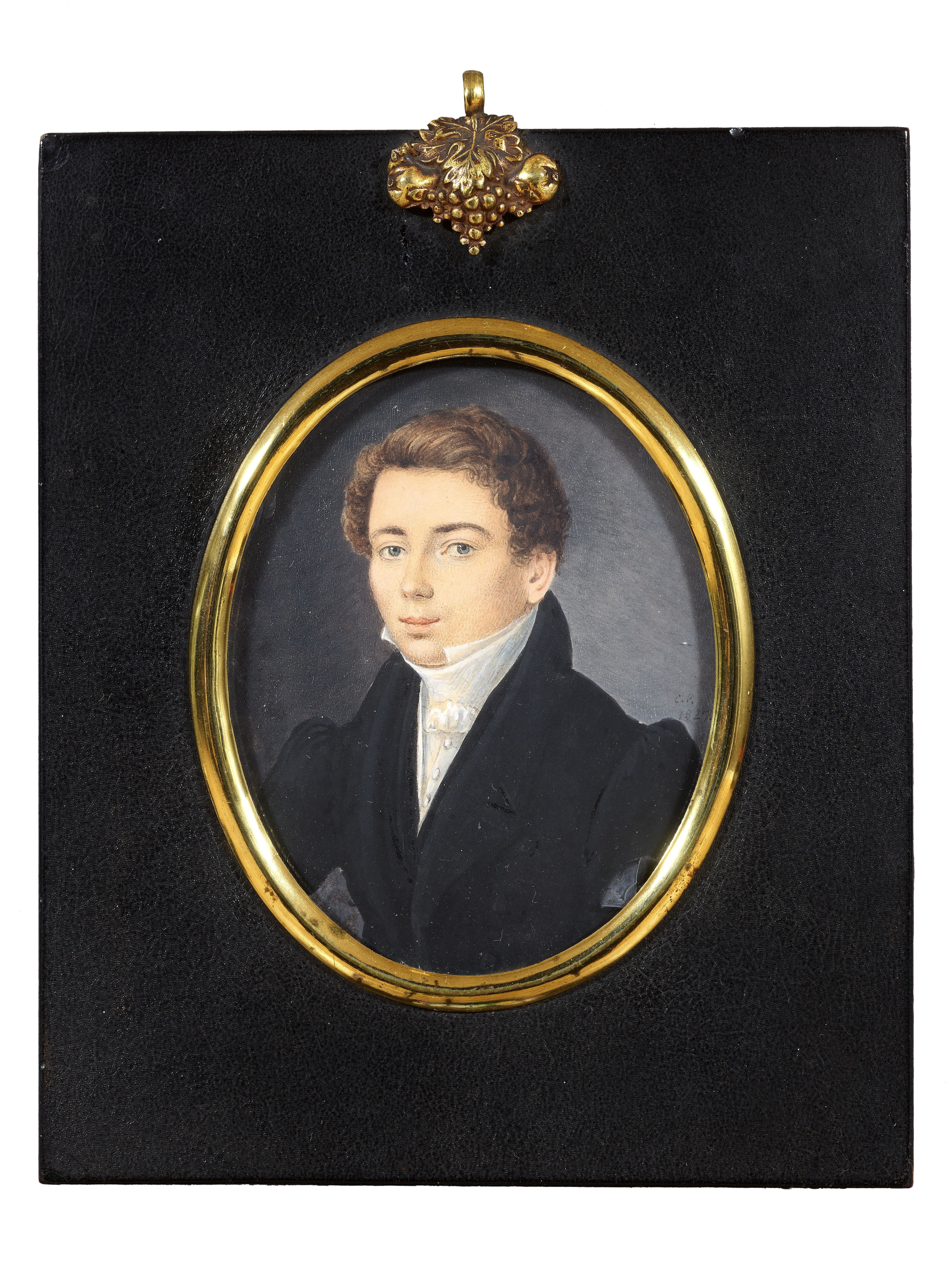
Ernst Frederik August Bilsted for whom the new main building was constructed in 1852

In 1795, Høvdingsgaard and Lilliendal were sold to Attorney General Peter Uldall. He had earlier in his career been the defense attorney of Queen Caroline Mathilde and Johann Friedrich Struensee. Peter Uldall died just two years after buying the estates. He had prior to his death changed the name of the Høvdingshus estate to Høvdingsgård. His widow, Anthonette Hansen, sold Høvdingsgård and Lilliendal buyers around a year later.

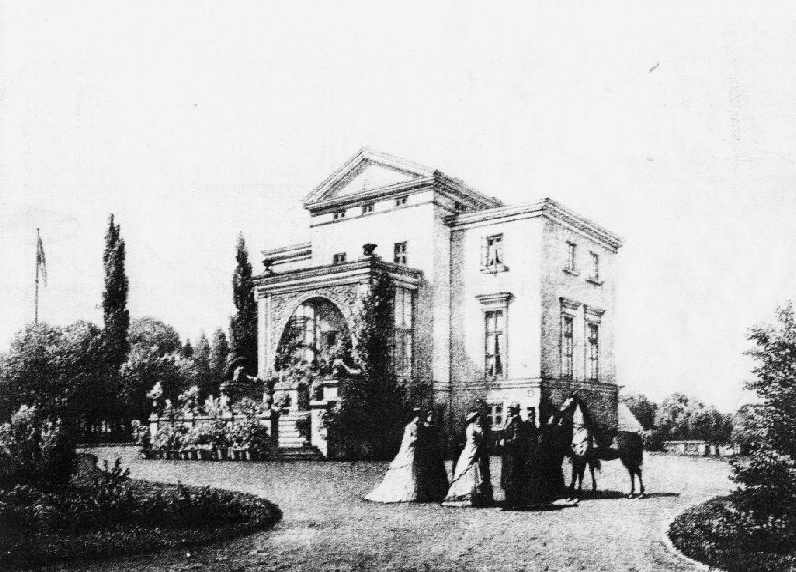
The new main building

The new owner of Høvdingsgård was Lars Terpager Hagen. He had previously leased Petersgaard from his father-in-law Peter Johansen. Lars Terpager Hagen's son, Peter Hagen, inherited the estate after hisfather's death in 1833. He was hit by mental decease and died in 1848. Høvdingsgård was then passed to his sister, Maren Regine Hagen, and her husband, Ernst Frederik Andreas Bilsted. In 1852, Bilsted constructed a new main building with the assistance of the architect Vilhelm Theodor Walther. Ernst Frederik Andreas Bilsted died in 1871. In 1883, Maren Regine Hagen ceded the estate to their two sons-in-law, Fritz Peter Adolph Uldall and Bredo Ove Ernst von Obelitz. Fritz Peter Adolph Uldall. who was married to the elder daughter Anna Elisabeth Helene Caroline Bilsted (1741–1938), was a vice admiral in the Royal Danish Navy. Incidentally, he was the great-grandson of the estate's earlier owner, Peter Uldall. Bredo Ove Ernst von Obelitz, who was married to the younger daughter Emma Henriette Erneste Regine Bilsted, (1849–1939), was a Supreme Court justice. Both families lived in Copenhagen.

=== 20th century ===
In 1901, Høvdingsgård was acquired by A. F. J. C. Lassen. He had previously been the owner of a tobacco plantation on Sumatra. In 1917, it was sold to his son Emil Victor Schou Lassen. He was married to Suzanne Marie Raben-Levetzau. Their son Anders Lassen, was born on the estate in 1920. He would later be the only non-Commonwealth recipient of the British Victoria Cross in the Second World War.

In 1938, Høvdingsgaard was acquired by the merchant Hans Lystrup (1765-1962). Om 1931, he had also bought Mullerup at Slagelse. Pn his death in 1962, Høvdingsgård passed to his daughter Karen Marie Dinesen (née Lystrup). She was married to the landowner Anders Wilhelm Dinesen, born at nearby Kragerup and the owner of Skjørringe on Falster.

== Today ==
Høvdingsgtård is currently owned by Anita Halbye (née Dinesen). The estate has a total area of 792 hectares.

== Cultural references ==
Høvdingsgård was used as a location for the eponymous, fictional manor house in the 1953 feature film Hejrenæs (1953).

== List of owners ==
- ( -1774) The Crown
- (1774-1785) Hans Gustav Lillienskiold
- (1785-1795) Niels Lunde Reiersen
- (1795-1798) Peter Uldall
- (1798-1799) Anthonette Uldall, née Hansen
- (1799-1833) Lars Terpager Hagen
- (1833-1848) Peter Larsen Hagen
- (1848-1871) Ernst Frederik Andreas Bilsted
- (1871-1873) Maren Regine Bilsted, née Hagen
- (1873-1901) Fritz Peter Adolph Uldall
- (1873-1901) Bredo Ove Ernst von Obelitz
- (1901-1917) Axel Frederik Julius Christian Lassen
- (1917-1929) Emil Victor Schau Lassen
- (1929-1938) E. A. Hagstrøm
- (1938-1963) Hans Lystrup
- (1963-1987) Karen Marie Dinesen, née Lystrup
- (1987- ) Anita Halbye, née Dinesen
