= Benjamin Wolff =

Danish businessman (1790–1866)

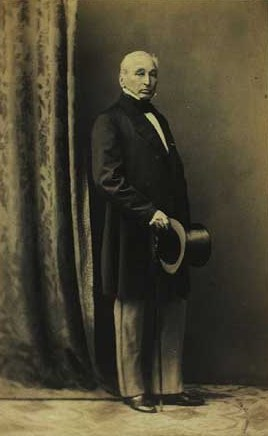
- Wolff photographed in 1972 by Peter Most.
- Born: 13 October 1790; Copenhagen, Denmark
- Died: 7 May 1866 (aged 75); Engelholm, Denmark
- Occupations: Businessman, landowner
- Known for: Art collection

Benjamin Wolff (13 October 1790 – 7 May 1866) was a Danish businessman, landowner and art collector. After twelve years in India (1817–1829) working for the English trade agency Cruttenden, Mackillop & Co., Wolff returned to Denmark as a wealthy man and acquired Engelholm Manor south of Copenhagen.

== Early life and education ==
Wolff was born in Copenhagen, the son of horse trader Lars Peder Wolff (1746–1818) and Christiane Margrethe Nielsen (1762–1828). Wolff was the elder brother of Niels Woldd, who would later acquire Vodroffsgaard in Frederiksberg through his marriage to Emilie Zinn. His father owned a number of properties in Copenhagen and Vesterbro as well as the country house Grøndal in Frederiksberg. He attended Borgerdyd School. In 1807, Wolff became the apprentice of an English merchant in Copenhagen. In 1808, he stayed with his maternal uncle, a clergyman, on the island of Funen. From March 1809, he worked for the Royal Danish Mail while at the same time studying law at the University of Copenhagen, graduating in 1811.

== Years in India ==
In 1816, Wolff followed the example of two of his brothers, moving to India, where he was employed by the British trade agency Cruttenden, Mackillop & Co. in Calcutta. Over the next years, he had a successful career in the company.

== Landowner in Denmark ==
In 1829, he returned to Denmark. In 1830, he purchased the estate Engelholm at Tappernøje. He improved the soil, planted forest on part of the land and constructed many new buildings.

In 1844 and again in 1846, Wolff was a member of the Roskilde Provincial Constituent Assembly as a representative of the estate owners. From 1841 to 1846, he was a member of the board of representatives of the Bank of Denmark. From 1841 to 1848, he was a member of tiendekommissær for Vordingborg distrikt. From 1841 to 1859, he was a landvæsenskommisær for Præstø County.

From 1841 to 1855, he was a member of the local parish council (sogne-forstanderskabet) for Snesere. From 1841 to 1865, he was a member of the local county council. In 1839, he was a co-founder of Landboforeningen for Præstø Amt and for some years also served as its chairman. In 1843, he was a co-founder of Godsejerforeningen. He was one of the authors of its protest against the abolition of copyholds in Denmark. In 1845, he was a co-founder of Sparekassen for Præstø By og Omegn. He also acted as administrator of Oremandsgaard (1843–1861) and Lundbygård (1843–1848 and 1856–1857) and from 1856 to 1865 oversaw the management of the Barony of Stampenborg (Nysø). For the widow of the Præstø merchant H. C. Grønvolds, he was responsible of her share of the town's leading grain and animal feed business.

== Amateur artist and art collector ==
At a young age, Wolff had attended the lower-ranking schools at the Royal Danish Academy of Fine Arts in Copenhagen. He remained a dedicated draughtsman and watercolourist throughout his life. Over the course of 30 years, Wolff assembled an extensive collection of drawings and prints, ranging from 16th century European Old Masters to 19th century Danish Golden Age and Indian art. The collection consisted of some 2,000 drawings. It remained in the ownership of the family for several generations. In 1915, part of the collection was donated to the National Gallery of Denmark's Royal Collection of Graphic Art. The Indian drawings were sold at Bruun Rasmussen in 2016 and the European drawings were sold in 2018.

== Personal life ==
Wolff married Juliane Lovise Sneedorff (1811–1898), daughter of Counter Admiral Hans Christian Sneedorff (1759–1824) and Marie E. Tønder (1770–1815), on 24 August 1832 in Holmen Church in Copenhagen.

In 1859, he was created a Knight in the Order of the Dannebrog. He died on 7 May 1866 on the EngelHolm estate. He is buried at Lyndby Churchyard. Later in life Wolff also purchased Grevensvænge and was thereby able to leave an estate to each of his two sons, H. C. T. Wolff-Sneedorff (1836–1924) and Gerner Wolff-Sneedorff (1850–1931).
