= Bernt Collet =

Bernt Collet may refer to:

- Bernt Johan Collet (born 1941), Danish politician
- Bernt Anker Collet, Norwegian-born Danish landowner
