= Peter Uldall =

Danish attorney and prosecutor (1743–1798)

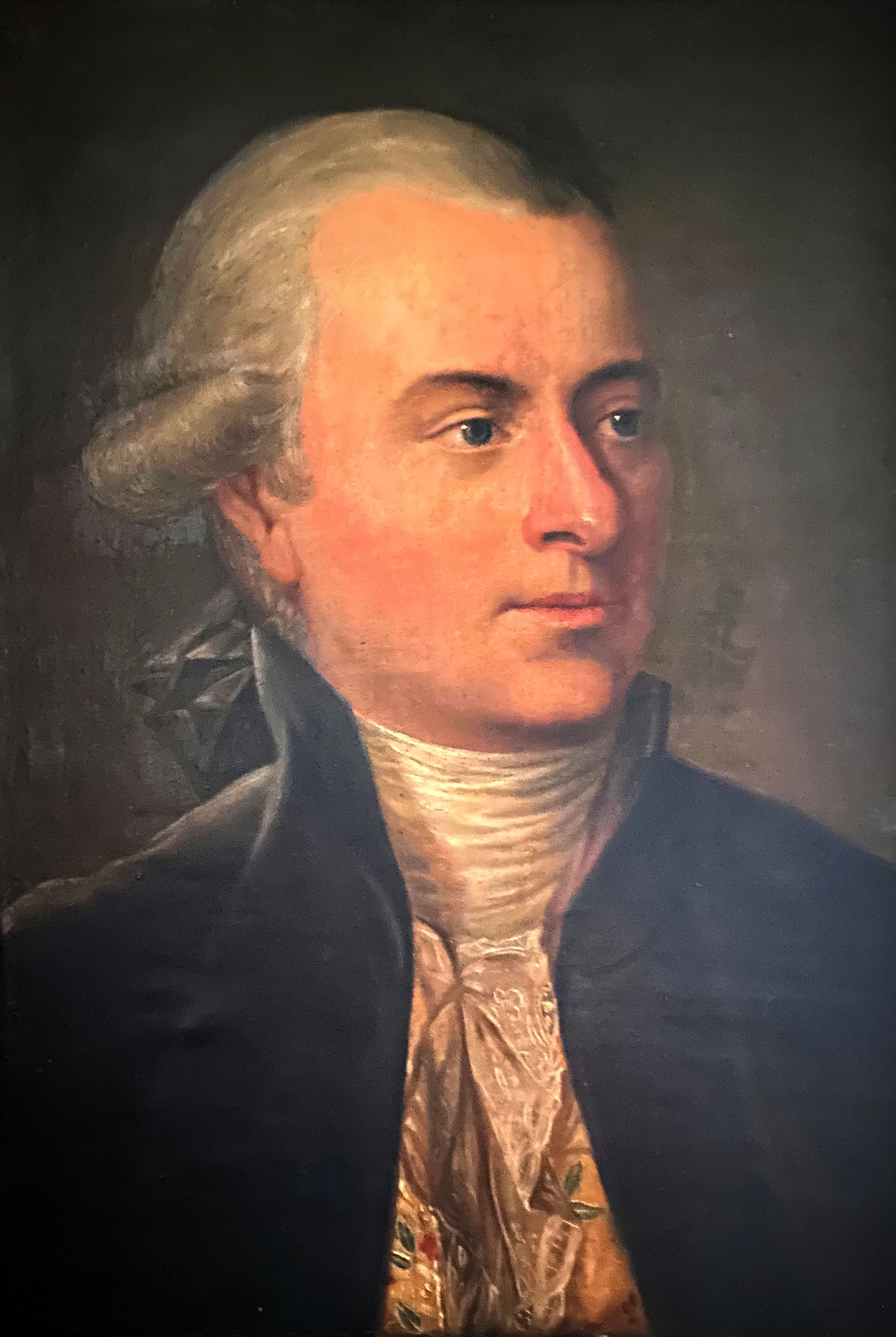
Peter Uldall, painted by Jens Juel

Peter Uldall (29 June 1743 – 11 November 1798) was a Danish Supreme Court attorney, public prosecutor general (from 1783) and burgermaster in Copenhagen (from 1788). In 1772, he served as defence lawyer for Johann Friedrich Struensee and Queen Caroline Matilda. In 1796, he bought the estates Høvdingsgård and Lilliendal at Vordingborg.

== Early life and education ==
Uldall was born on 29 June 1743 in Assens, Denmark, the son of Hans Pedersen Ulldall (1705–82) and Kirstine Hansdatter Hougaard (1711–96). His father was the local bailiff (byfoged) and herredsfoged of Båg and Vends hundreds. In 1753, he was appointed burgermaster of Assens.

Uldall completed his secondary schooling in 1744. He spent two years studying theology in accordance with his father's wishes before turning to law. He earned a law degree from the University of Copenhagen in 1763. During his studies, he was a resident of Ehlers Kollegium.

== Career ==
In 1765, Uldall started working for Supreme Court attorney J. J. Anchersen. In 1769, he was licensed as a Supreme Court attorney.

In 1773, Queen Caroline Mathilde selected him as her defence lawyer. Not long thereafter, he was also appointed defence lawyer for Johann Friedrich Struensee. The trial against Struense and Queen Carolin Mathilde was a mere show trial, but despite its outcome, it helped establish Uldall as one of the city's leading lawyers.

In 1783, Uldall represented the dissatisfied shareholders in the high-profile lawsuit against the Danish Asiatic Company's In the same year, he was appointed public prosecutor general (generalfiskal). In 1788, he was also appointed depity burgermaster.

== Personal life ==
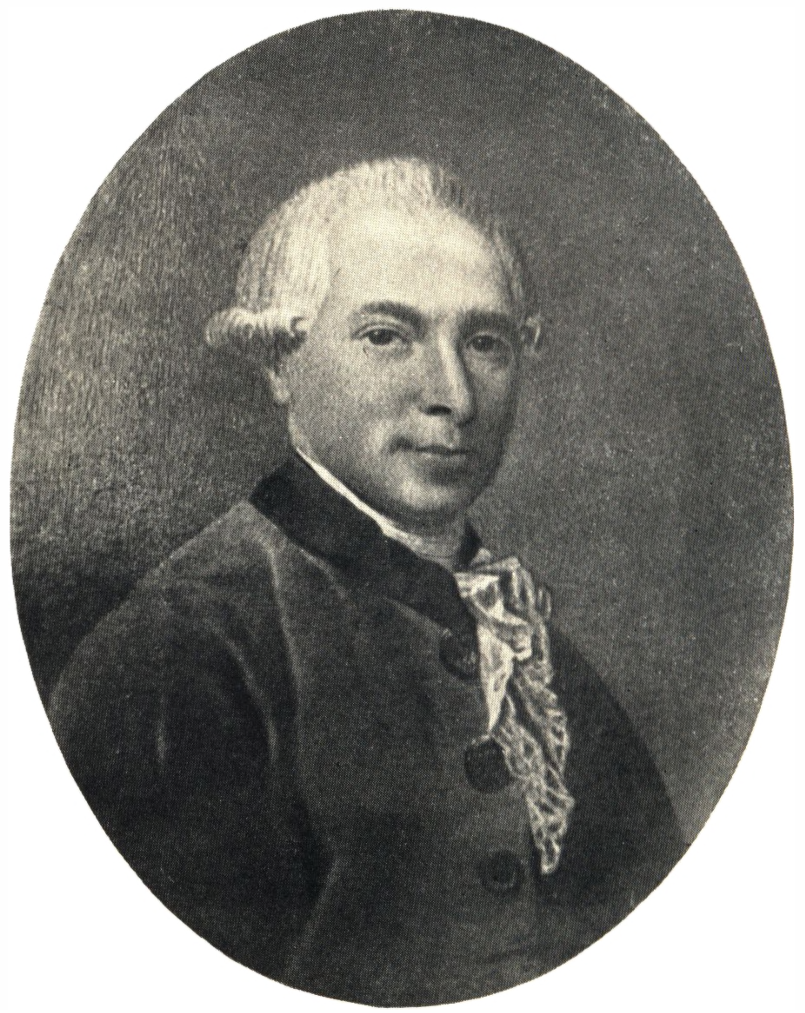
Peter Uldall

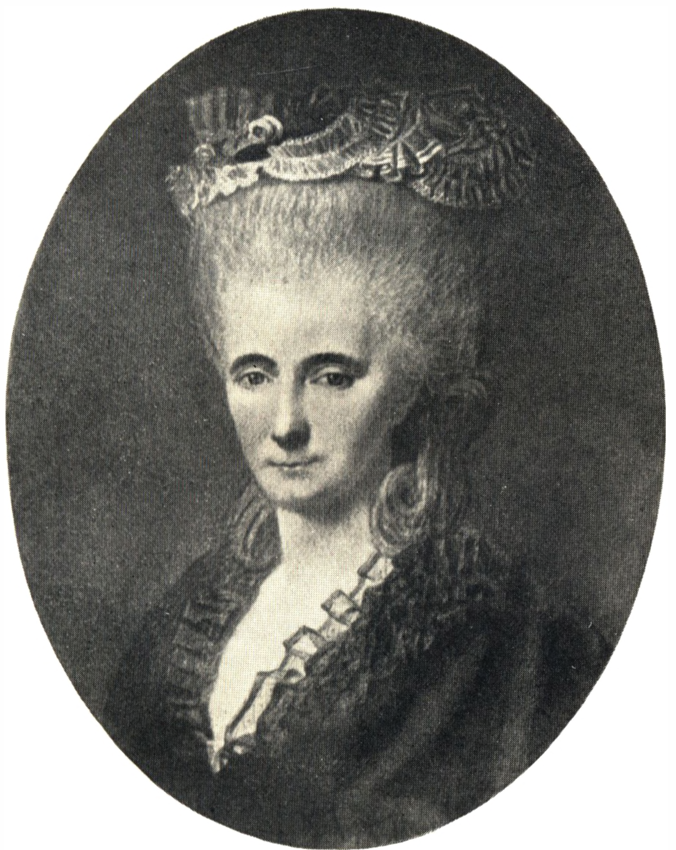
Antoinette Uldall, née Hansen

On 23 September 1772, Uldall was married to Anthonette Hansen (1739–1804). She was a daughter of military prosecutor and businessman Stephen Hansen til Frydendal (1701–70) and Dorothea S. Rafn (1710–73).

In 1788, Uldall and his wife went on a journey to Bad Pyrmont in Waldeck.

The Uldall family lived in a house on Vimmelskaftet (No. 24, Frimand's Quarter; later Vimmelskaftet 2w1). During the devastating Copenhagen Fire of 1795 he managed to save his house from the flames by paying a large party to stay on put out the embers. This kept the fire from spreading to the entire northern side of the street.

In 1796, Uldall bought Høvdingsgård and Lilliendal from Niels Lunde Reiersen for 216,000 Danish rigsdaler. His plan was to establish a barony from the land, but he died before this was realized.

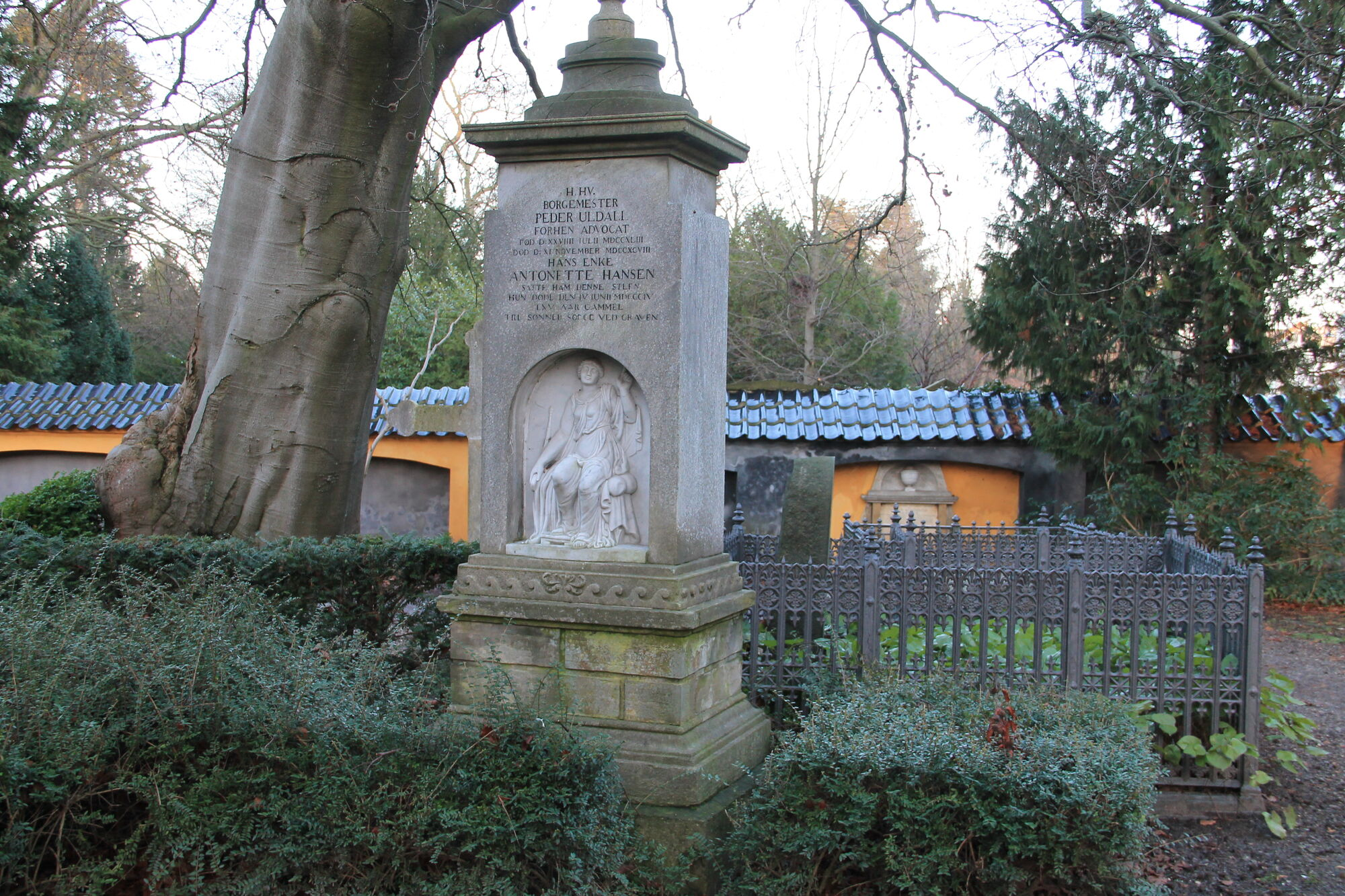
Uldall's tomb at Assistens Cemetery in Copenhagen

Uldall died on 11 November 1798 in Copenhagen. He is buried at Assistens Cemetery.

In 1799, Antoinette Uldall sold Høvdingggaard. In 1803, she also sold Liliendal.

Uldall's son Hans Friderich Uldall, til Espe Hovedgård (1775–1836) was a general war commissioner. He was married to Maria Dorothea Købke (1774–1838), a daughter of burgermaster Carl Adolph Købke, Bagermester (1735–1790) and Christiane Petersen (1736–1801). The younger son Wilhelm August Uldall (1781–1852) was a Supreme Court attorney. He was married to Hanne Lovise Nellemann (1783–1865), a daughter of bailiff and postmaster in Assens Rasmus Ludvig Nellemann (1757–1828).
