= Anne Cathrine Collett =

Norwegian-Danish landowner (1768–1846)

Anne Cathrine Callett
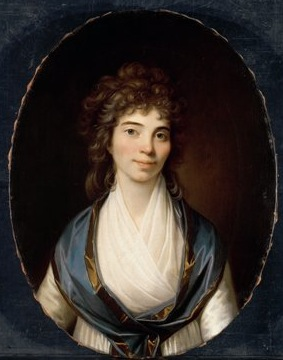
- Anne Cathrine Collett by Jens Juel
- Born: 10 February 1768; Norway
- Died: 27 January 1846 (aged 77); Denmark
- Occupation: Landowner
- Spouse: Peter Nicolaj Arbo

Anne Cathrine Collett (19 February 1768 – 27 January 1846), was a Norwegian-Danish landowner and one of the wealthiest women of Denmark in her time.

Collett was born into the wealthy Collett family of timber merchants in Christiania (now Oslo). Her parents were Peter Collett (1740–86) of Buskerud and Maren Kirstine Holmboe (1745–68). She married Peter Nicolaj Arbo who subsequently entered the family's company Collett & Søn.

The couple moved to Copenhagen where they lived in the Peschier House at Holmens Kanal 12. He acquired the country house Aldershvile north of Copenhagen and the manors of Lundbygård and Oremandsgaard at Præstø. After his death in 1827, she ran the estate with the assistance of count Knuth.

Collet died on 27 January 1846. Having no children, she left her estate to her nephews Bernt Anker Collet and Peter Collet (1820-1860).
