= CEPOS =

Danish think tank

Centre for Political Studies CEPOS Center for Politiske Studier
- Founders: Bernt Johan Collet and others
- Established: 2004
- Focus: "Furthering personal and economic freedom and the rule of law in Denmark"
- Chair: Jan Duckert
- CEO: Jes B. Christensen
- Subsidiaries: CEPOS University
- Address: Landgreven 3, 3. Sal; DK-1301 København K
- Location: Copenhagen, Denmark
- Coordinates: 55.6829°N 12.5855°E
- Interactive map of Centre for Political Studies; CEPOS; Center for Politiske Studier
- Website: About CEPOS (English)

Centre for Political Studies, also known as CEPOS, is an independent association which works as a classical liberal/free-market conservative think-tank in Denmark. It is a strongly right-leaning and highly political association.

== History ==
Inspired by institutions such as The Brookings Institution, American Enterprise Institute, The Heritage Foundation, Adam Smith Institute, Institute of Economic Affairs, and others, CEPOS was founded on 11 March 2004 by a number of high-profile representatives of Danish academia, business, media, and the arts, including former defence minister Bernt Johan Collet, who became chairman of the board.

Other prominent co-founders include former Prime Minister Poul Schlüter, former Minister of Foreign Affairs Uffe Ellemann-Jensen, university professors Nicolai Juul Foss, Jesper Lau Hansen, Bent Jensen, and Peter Kurrild-Klitgaard. Also included are well-known journalists Bent Blüdnikow and Samuel Rachlin and cultural personalities such as Bent Fabricius-Bjerre and Michael Laudrup. Martin Ågerup was hired in 2005 as the think tank's CEO. In 2023 he was succeeded by Jes B. Christensen.

During the summer of 2004, the new Board managed to bring in the necessary grants and contributions from foundations, corporations, and individual sponsors. At a meeting on 2 October 2004, the founders confirmed their decision to establish the think-tank, CEPOS. The official opening of CEPOS took place on 10 March 2005 at Hotel D'Angleterre.

CEPOS is dedicated to preserving and strengthening what they see as the foundations of a free and prosperous society by supporting tax-cuts, limited government, and private enterprise as well as vital cultural and political institutions. The work of CEPOS claim to support a civil society consisting of free and responsible individuals and to foster policies, institutions and culture that is supportive of a free market economy, the rule of law, and a civil society consisting of free and responsible individuals.

The think tank is a known advocate of school choice, a more open immigration policy, lower taxes and less regulation, and a known opponent of increased public surveillance, anti-terrorism laws that curtail civil liberties and criminalizing what they see as "victimless crime". CEPOS produces policy analyses on a wide range of issues, including education, immigration, legal reform, taxation, regulation and the public sector. It hosts numerous conferences each year and has attracted high-level speakers, including Robert Barro, George Borjas, Nobel laureate Edward Prescott, Nobel laureate Gary Becker, Nigel Lawson and many others.

CEPOS is frequently quoted in the media, with over 5000 media clips amassed over its years in operation, and was described by the Danish business magazine Berlingske Nyhedsmagasin in 2007 as being "in charge of the public debate".

CEPOS is the Danish participant in the Economic Freedom of the World Project as well as the International Property Rights Index.

=== CEPOS Academy ===
In 2006, CEPOS launched CEPOS Academy (CEPOS Akademi), a free course taught by university professors, industry leaders and former statesmen in the underlying philosophical, sociological and economic ideas behind classical liberalism, and the various theories behind the free market. Admission is highly competitive.

== Criticism ==
CEPOS has repeatedly been criticized for downplaying the effects of climate change and its consequences for both the environment and the global economy. In Danish science magazine Videnskab.dk researchers have accused CEPOS of utilizing a type of deflective climate scepticism to stall serious climate action.

== Awards and ranking ==
CEPOS is a five-time winner of the Atlas Economic Research Foundation and John Templeton Foundation awards given to the best think tanks around the world. It was awarded the 2006 Templeton Freedom Award, given an Honorable Mention in the 2007 Templeton Freedom Award Grant, and received the 2007 Templeton Freedom Prize for Initiative in Public Relations. It was awarded second place in the 2008 Sir Anthony Fisher International Memorial Award for the best book published by a think tank and won the 2009 Fisher Venture Grant Award.

In the 2014 Global Go To Think Tank Index Report (Think Tanks and Civil Societies Program, University of Pennsylvania), CEPOS was placed number 52 (of 80) in the "Top Think Tanks in Western Europe".
