= Bernt Anker Collet =

Norwegian-born Danish landowner

Bernt Anker Collet (8 August 1803 - 2 February 1857) was a Norwegian-born Danish landowner who founded the Danish branch of the Norwegian Collett family. He owned Lundbygård from 1846.

== Biography ==
Bent Anker Collett was born into the wealthy Collett family on 8 August 1803. His parents were businessman and judge Peter Collett and Ellertine Severine Bendeke.

He married Emilie Henriette Christense Rørbye. They had two children, the daughter Eilertine Eleonore Collet(born 1834) and the son Peter Ferdinand Collet (born 1836).

He moved to Denmark with his family in 1857 after inheriting Lundbygård on the southern part of Zealand from her aunt Anne Cathrine Arbo née Collett. It had been acquired by her late husband Peter Nicolaj Arbo in 1824.
