= Julius Nicolai Jacobsen =

Norwegian businessperson and politician (1829–1894)

Julius Nicolai Jacobsen (19 May 1829 – 25 December 1894) was a Norwegian businessperson and politician. He founded J. N. Jacobsen & Co. which became one of the country's larger forest product companies.

== Biography ==
He was born in the borough of Strømsø in Drammen, Buskerud, Norway. He was the son of Andreas Jacobsen (1798–1876) and his wife Adelgunda Margaretha Schive (1808–38). His father was a sexton and school teacher. He graduated from the three-year commercial school at Drammen (Drammens lærde skole) in 1844. After that, he was employed by A. J. Boger in Christiania (now Oslo). He moved to Fredrikstad (then Fredriksstad) in 1848 where he was first employed by Peder Gelertsen & Co.

In 1852, Jacobsen started his own wooden shop, based in the village of Græsvig. He became a self-made businessman acquiring other mills and exporting cargo loads to the Netherlands. He settled at the Lykkeberg estate in the parish of Glemmen which he bought in 1855. Through transactions in 1856 and 1859, he amassed a large property at the village of Græsvig on the peninsula of Onsøy outside of Fredrikstad. He founded a sawmill Græsvig Brug on 1 January 1860, the same day as national sawmill privileges limiting private enterprise were abolished. The sawmill was a catalyst of growth, spurring a significant migration to the district. Græsvig Brugs Skole, a school for children of workers at the sawmill, was founded in 1862. Later followed a town hall in 1866 and Græsvig Church which was consecrated in 1884, but burned in 1915. The company was renamed J. N. Jacobsen & Co. in 1863 when his brother, Johan Fredrik Thorne Jacobsen (1835–1917), entering as a business partner.

Jacobsen served as a deputy representative to the Norwegian Parliament during the term 1877–1879, representing the constituency of Fredriksstad. He was also a member of the city council's executive committee from 1868 to 1894 and served as deputy mayor for some time.

Following his death, J. N. Jacobsen & Co. was transformed to a limited company. His brother took over the leadership, together with Julius' son-in-law Julius Christian Juel (1853–1930). The youngest son Andreas Julius Jacobsen (1879- 1967) was involved from 1907. Facing the economic hardships of the time, J. N. Jacobsen & Co. went bankrupt in 1926. The assets were seized and the house at Lykkeberg was sold, the buyer being Fredrikstad municipality. From 1931, Lykkeberg served as central administration offices for Fredrikstad Municipality.

== Personal life ==
In 1858, he married Olivia Fredrikke Bredesen (1841–1879). Jacobsen subsequently ordered the erection of a new house at Lykkeberg, drawn in Gothic style by the nationally known architect Paul Due. The house was finished in 1875. Tragically, Olivia died in 1879 after giving birth to their eighth child.

His daughter Elna Andrea Jacobsen (1870–1958) was married to sports official Johan Sverre between 1893 and 1917.

Jacobsen was proclaimed Knight of the Royal Norwegian Order of St. Olav in 1882 and Commander of the same order in 1894. The city council named a street in Fredrikstad after him in 1894.
