= Strømsø =

Borough of Drammen, Buskerud, Norway

Coordinates: 59°44′07″N 10°12′22″E

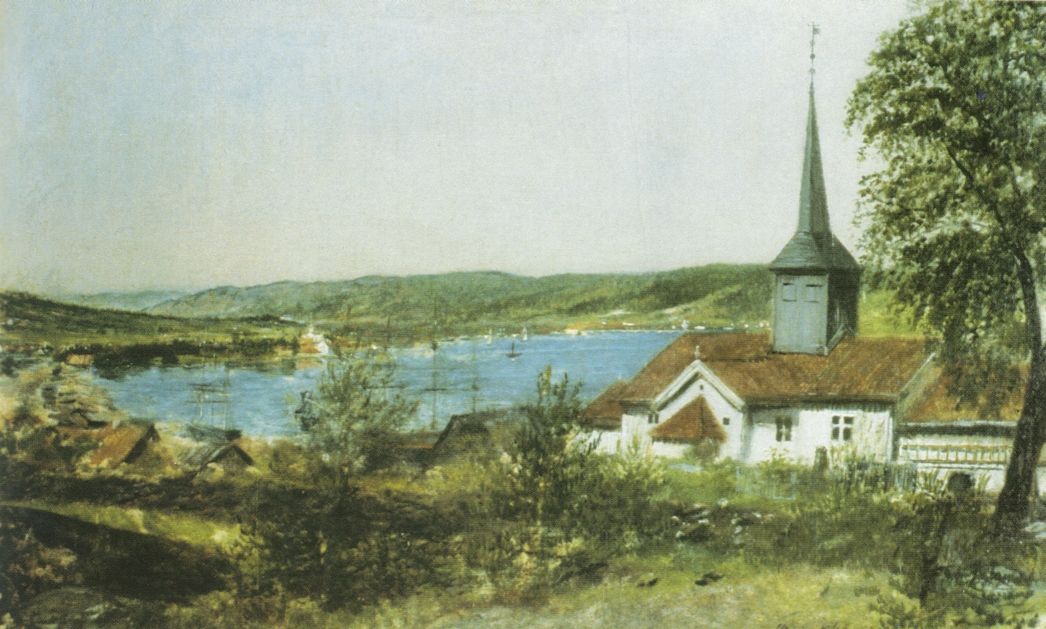
Strømsø med den gamle kirke på Tangen Matthias Stoltenberg (1847)

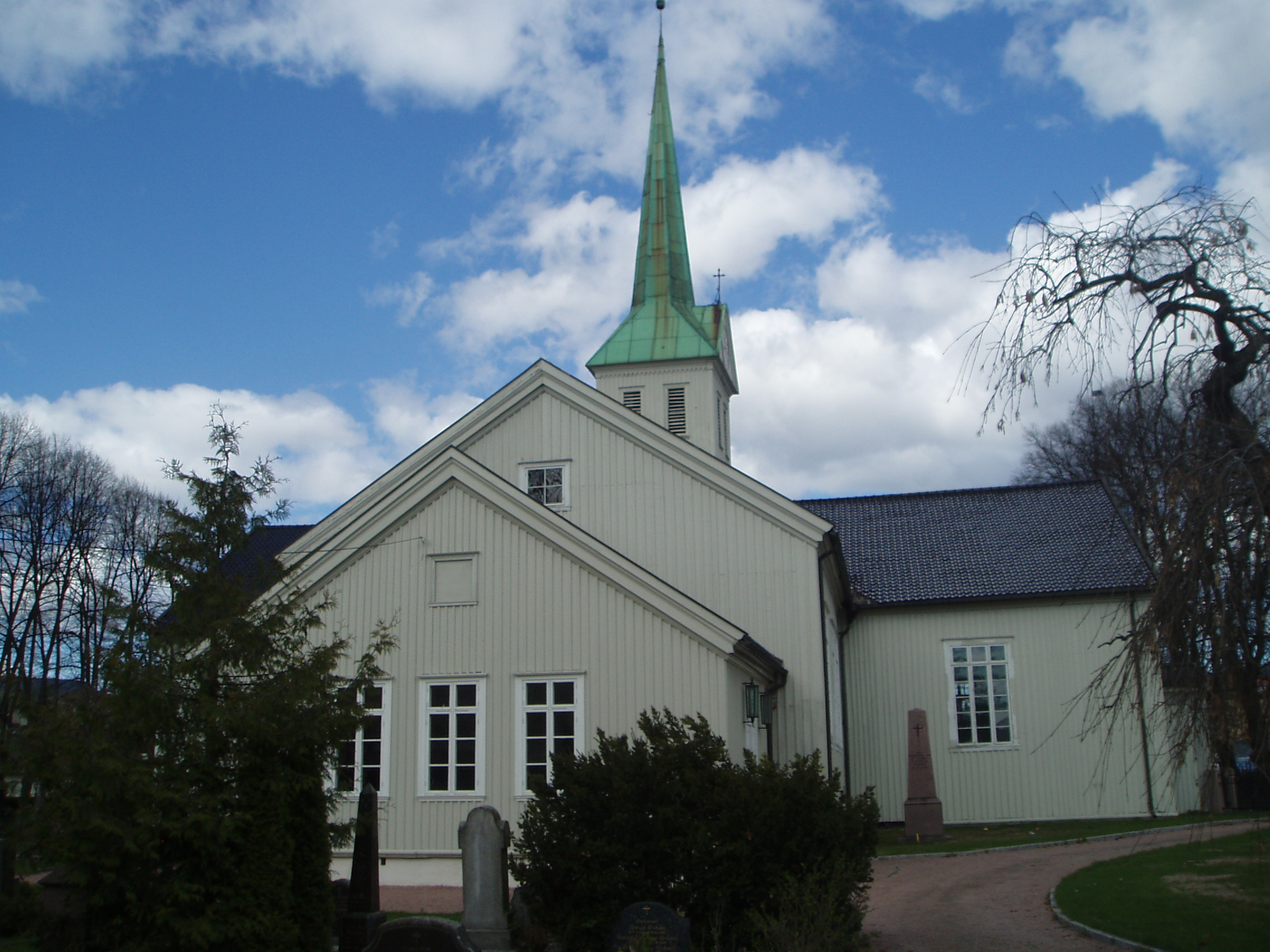
Strømsø Church

Strømsø is a borough of Drammen, Buskerud, Norway.

Strømsø is located at the southern side of the river Drammenselva. Until about 1600, Strømsø was an island surrounded by the Drammenselva, but was later made landfast. In 1728 Strømsø was granted rights as a trade center by the king, and these rights were expanded to full trade rights in 1745. In 1811 Strømsø and Bragernes (on the northern side of Drammenselva) were united to form the town of Drammen.

Strømsø has sports facilities, retail, office, industry and schools. Most of Strømsø consists of residential areas. At Strømsø we find Drammen railway station, being a junction for the Randsfjorden Line (connecting to the Bergen Line crossing the Hardangervidda), the Sørlandet Line (leading to Kristiansand and Stavanger) and the Vestfold Line.

The main part of Drammen Harbor is situated at Strømsø. Opened in 1925, the Drammen shipyard (Drammen Slip og Verksted) was an important part of Drammen's industry until it closed down in 1986.

The historic crucifix shaped church Strømsø Church (Strømsø Kirke) which was opened in 1667 is located in Strømsø. The tower of the church was not built until 1694. The church's architect was Daniel Knoff.

During the first part of this century the old industrial area of Strømsø, formerly known as Grønland, has been remodeled and transformed into a Science Park (Kunnskapsparken), providing facilities for several governmental institutions such as the police authorities, County offices and the campus for Buskerud University College, Norwegian School of Management - BI Buskerud, Telemark University College (TUC) and Drammen library.

== Notable people from Strømsø ==
- Peter Nicolaj Arbo (1768–1827) timber trader and landowner
- Jacob Neumann (1772–1848) Norwegian bishop
- Peter Tidemand Malling (1807–1878) Norwegian bookseller, printer and publisher
- Julius Nicolai Jacobsen (1829–1894) Norwegian businessperson and politician
- Torgeir Vraa (1868–1934) Norwegian politician for the Labour Party
