= Lundbygård =

Manor house in Vordingborg Municipality, Denmark

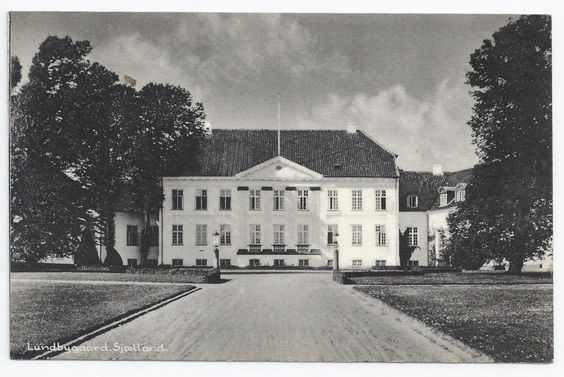
- Vintage photo of Lundbygård

General information
- Architectural style: Neoclassical
- Location: Vordingborg Municipality, Denmark
- Coordinates: 55°7′33.48″N 11°53′45.79″E
- Completed: 1815
- Owner: Bernt Johan Collet

Lundbygård is a manor house and estate located in Lundby, Vordingborg Municipality, in the southeastern part of Denmark. It has been owned by the Collet family since 1827. Its current owner is former Danish Defence Minister Bernt Johan Collet. The Neoclassical main building from 1815 was listed on the Danish registry of protected buildings and places by the Danish Heritage Agency on 6 July 1918.

== History ==
Lundbygård has existed since the Middle Ages. The first known owner is Niels Olufsen who was the owner in 1355. It was acquired by Peder Sten in the 1480s and stayed in his family for several generations. His grandson, Knud Steensen, sold it to a widow, Anne Nielsdatter Lunge, who ceded it to the Crown in exchange for Kronen in 1577. The Crown made the estate available to various powerful men. In 1661, Svend Poulsen was granted it for life in appreciation of his role in the Swedish Wars and five years later he received it as his personal property. Shortly thereafter he sold it to be able to pay his debts. The buyer was Christian Sivertsen who sold it to Knud Gregersen. The property had at this point fallen into disrepair and was in 1685 again acquired by the Crown.

In 1686, Lundbygård was acquired by Johan Henrik Schmidt, who was ritmester at the National Regiment on Zealand. His widow, Maren Pedersdatter, sold it to Hector Gottfried Masius in 1705. His son, Christian von der Maase, sold it to the Crown in 1719. It was then included in Vordingborg Rytterdistrikt. The cavalry districts was sold in auction in 1774. Vordingborg Rytterdistrikt was divided into 12 manors of which Lundbygård was one of them. It was acquired by Caspar Wilhelm von Munthe of Morgenstierne. He constructed new farm buildings and a brickyard on the estate. In 1786, he sold Lundbygård to Adam Gottlob Wiimh. who later published a handbook for farmers. In 1811, he sold the estate to Ulrik Christian von Schmidten who was succeeded by Jobst Gerhard von Scholten. It was for a while again owned by the state.

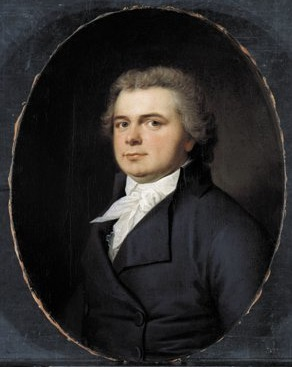
Peter Nicolaj Arbo

In 1824, Lyndbygård was acquired by Peter Nicolaj Arbo. In 1804, he had moved from Drammen in Norway to Copenhagen where he ran a major timber trading company. His widow Anne Cathrine Collett took over the estate after his death in 1827 and owned it until her own death in 1846. The couple had no children and she, therefore, left it to her nephew Bent Anker Collet. He constructed new farm building and improved both the fields and the management of the forests. His son Peter Ferdinand Collet inherited Lundbygård in 1857. He sold off most of the tenant farms.

== Architecture ==
The main building dates from 1815 and is designed in the Neoclassical style. It originally consisted of a two-storey main wing flanked by two detached side wings placed at an angle to create a symmetrical fan-shape. The three central bays of the main wing are decorated with pilasters and are tipped by a triangular pediment. The two side wings were attached to the main wing in connection with an adaption carried out by Gotfred Tvede in 1910. He also removed the original main entrance and staircase in the central axis of the main wing. The original main entrance was restored in connection with another adaption of the building carried out by the architect Mogens og Peter Koch in 1943.

To the south of the main building is a large courtyard and a complex of farm buildings. It comprises a large barn from 1777 which was converted into an equestrian house in 1843. The rest of the farm buildings were destroyed by two fires in 1909 and 1928. The new farm buildings date from after the fire in 1923 and from 1977.

== Park ==
The garden is located to the north of the main building. A garden in French style was created by Caspar Wilhelm von Munthe of Morgenstierne. The garden was redesigned by professor C.Th. Sørensen between 1941 and 1968. It contains many large trees as well as a swimming pool.

== Today ==
The estate is today owned by Bernt Johan Collet. It covers 1000 hectares of which 400 hectares are farmland and 600 hectares are woodland. It is the largest grower of Christmas trees in Europe.

Lundbygård contains a small museum with artifacts found on the estate. It is only open on Constitution Day (5 June).

== List of owners ==
- (1355) Niels Oleffsøn
- (1360-1395) Niels Jensen
- (1431) Peder Nielsen
- (1468) Jep Smed
- (1484) Peder Sten
- (1497) Jørgen Pedersen Sten
- ( -1575) Knud Steensen
- (1575-1577) Anne Nielsdatter Steensen née Lunge
- (1577-1666) The Crown
- (1666-1672) Svend Poulsen
- (1672-1678) Christian Sivertsen
- (1678-1685) Knud Gregersen
- (1685-1686) The Crown
- (1686- ) Johan Henrik Schmidt
- ( -1705) Maren Pedersdatter, gift Schmidt
- (1705-c. 1709) Hector Gottfried Masius
- ( -1719) Christian v. d. Maase
- (1715-1774) The Crowb
- (1774-1786) Casper Wilhelm von Munthe af Morgenstierne
- (1786-1811) Adam Gottlob Wiimh
- (1811-1819) Ulrik Christian von Schmidten
- (1819-1822) Jobst Gerhard von Scholten
- (1822-1824) Statskassen
- (1824-1827) Peter Nicolaj Arbo
- (1827-1846) Anne Cathrine Arbo née Collett
- (1846-1857) Bernt Anker Collet
- (1857-1909) Peter Ferdinand Collet
- (1909-1932) Holger Peter Harald Collet
- (1932-1968) Harald Collet
- (1968–present) Bernt Johan Collet
