= Gressvik =

Village in Fredrikstad municipality, Norway

Coordinates: 59°13′N 10°54′E

Gressvik is a village located in the municipality of Fredrikstad, Norway. The river Seut separates Gressvik from the city of Fredrikstad. Gressvik stretches from Ørebekk in the north, to Rød and Viker in the south.

Before 1860, Gressvik consisted only of two farms (Hauge and Græsvig) and a few other houses. It eventually grew into a considerable settlement following the establishment of a sawmill by Julius Nicolai Jacobsen.

The centre of Gressvik is called "The Market", and functions as a shopping street. There are two schools for children aged 6–13 in Gressvik, Rød Barneskole and Hurrød Barneskole. Rød Barneskole is for students living in Oksviken, Viker, Krosnes, Rød and Dale. At Hurrød Barneskole, the students are from the centre of Gressvik. When the children are between 13 and 16 years old, they attend Gressvik Ungdomsskole.
