= Engelholm, Næstved Municipality =

Manor house and estate in Denmark

Engelholm
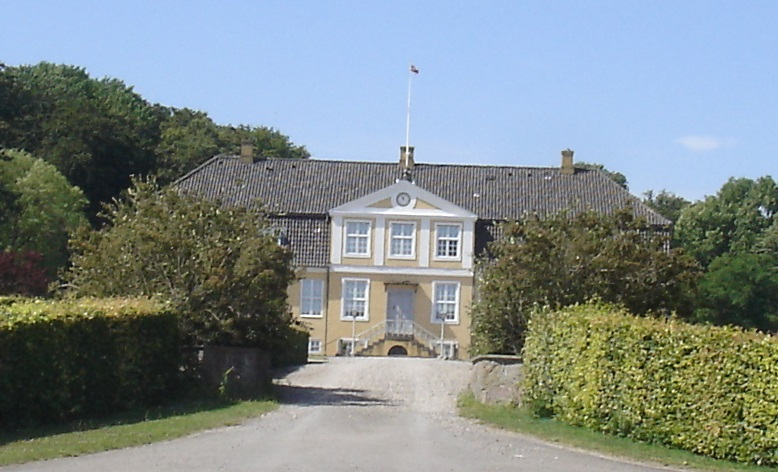
- Engelholm
- Interactive map of the Engelholm area

General information
- Architectural style: Neoclassical
- Location: Næstved Municipality, Engelholmvej 3, 4733 Tappernøje, Denmark
- Coordinates: 55°8′28″N 11°58′55″E
- Construction started: 1683
- Completed: 1686

Engelholm is a manor house and estate located four kilometres northwest of Præstø, in Næstved Municipality, some 60 kilometres south of Copenhagen, Denmark. It has been owned by members of the Wolf/Wolff-Sneedorf family since 1830. The main building was listed on the Danish registry of protected buildings and places by the Danish Heritage Agency in 1918.

== History ==
=== Petersen family ===
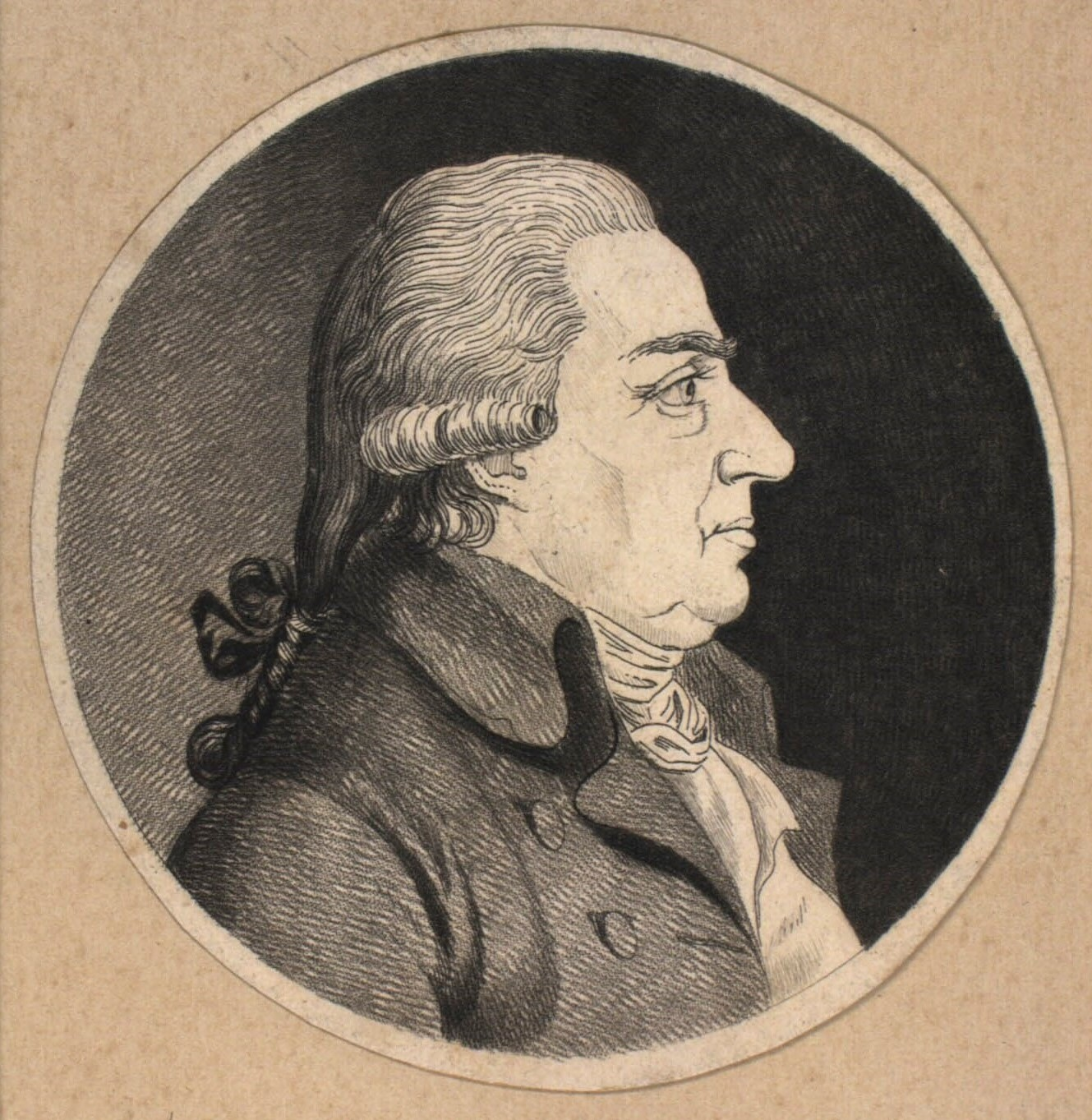
Hans Pedersen

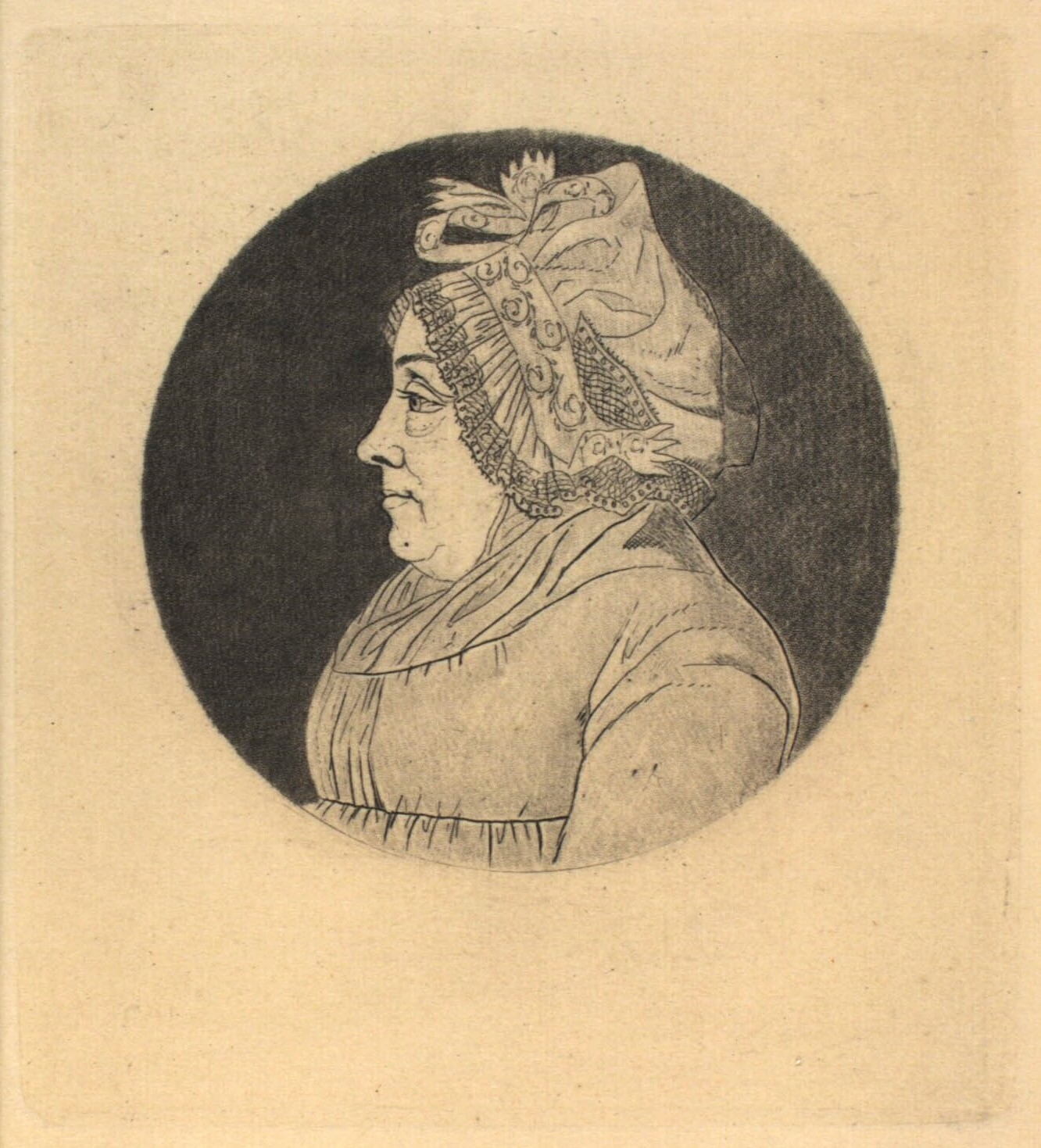
Inger Pedersen, née Engel

Engelholm was created when the former Vordingborg Cavalry District (Vordingborg Ryttergods) was divided into 12 estates and sold in public auction. The auction took place at Vordingborg Castle on 27 September. One of the estates, until then known as Skovbygaard, was sold for 30.120 Danish rigsdaler to Hans Petersen, a local master butcher. He had previously been indicted for charging double prices for all deliveries to queen dowager Juliane Marie's household but was acquitted due to lack of evidence. He was able to buy the estate after marrying the wealthy widow of miller Bendix Malling in 1773. She was called Inger Engel Malling, and Hans Petersen named the estate after her. Hans Petersen completed a new main building on the estate in 1785, and prior to that had also improved the farm buildings.

In 1793, Petersen sold Stensby Mill, Vrangsgårde (two farms) and Vestenbæk village (now known as Stensbygård) to his step son Jacob Malling for 33,000 Danish rigsdaler. In 1806, Stensbygaard was merged with Vranggaardene. The estate was then known as Vranggaard. In 1796, he bought Oremandsgaard.

On Petersen's death in 1803, Engelholm and Oremandsgaard were both passed to his son Peter Benedict Petersen. The manor fell into neglect during the crisis years of the 1800s and 1810s.

=== Ludvig Georg Cøln and state-ownership, 1825–1830 ===
In 1825, Peter Petersen's heirs sold Engelholm to Ludvig Georg Cøln. He was also hit by economic difficulties and the estate therefore entered administration by the Treasury (Rentekammeret) in 1827. By 1830, Cøln lived with his wife, two of their children, a maid and two lodgers in a first floor apartment on Møntergade in Copenhagen.

=== Wolff family ===
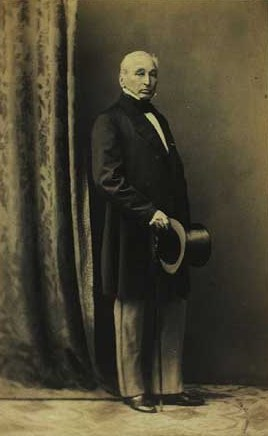
Benjamin Wolf

In 1830, the Treasury sold Engelholm to Benjamin Wolff. He had studied law at the University of Copenhagen before travelling to Calcutta, where he was employed by the trading house Cruttenden, Mackillop & Co., of which he later became a partner before returning to Denmark as a wealthy man in 1829. In 1832, he married Julie Sneedorff. They kept a large household at Engelholm. Their guests included Bertel Thorvaldsen and Adam Oehlenschläger. Wolf was an amateur painter and had also built a collection of local drawings and watercolours in India which he supplemented with Danish works after his return to the country. In 1855, Wolf also purchased the estate Grevensvænge.

Wolf's eldest son, Hans Christian Theodor Wolf, who had served as a military officer in the Second Schleswig War, inherited Engelholm in 1866. He and his brother Germer Wolf changed their last name to Wolff-Sneedorrf the following year in accordance with a wish made by their father in his will. Hans Christian Theodor Wolff-Sneedorrf was also bank manager of the local savings bank in Præstø. None of his sons outlived him and in 1906 he chose to cede Engelholm to his brother, who had already inherited Grevensvænge after their mother's death in 1875. Germer Wolff-Sneedorrf was a military officer with rank of rittmeister and chamberlain. He passed Engelholm on to his son Knud Wolff-Sneedorf in 1925.

== Architecture ==
The main building is from 1781–85. It is an 11 bay long, one-storey building with Mansard roof and a two-storey, three-bay avant corps on both sides. The building is rendered yellow with white details. A staircase with Rococo railing in the vestibule connects the two floors. The ceiling in the music room features a gilded rosette.

The main building was listed on the Danish registry of protected buildings and places by the Danish Heritage Agency on 2 July 1918.

== Surroundings ==
Peter Benedict Hansen created an English style landscape garden to the east of the house. It was later redesigned by the landscape architect Henrik August Flindt in the 1780s. The garden contains the grave of Hans Petersen as well as a family tomb for the Wolff-Sneedorf family.

== Today ==
An old storage building was renovated in 2011 as part of Realdania's Fremtidens Herregårde (Manor houses of the Future) programme. It is now used as a workshop and meeting place for people with vintage cars as well as a venue for meetings and events.

== List of owners ==
- -1775: Kronen (Vordingborg Rytterdistrikt)
- 1775-1803: Hans Petersen
- 1803-1824: Peter Benedict Petersen
- 1824-1825: The estate after Peter Benedict Petersen
- 1825-1827: Ludvig Georg Cøln
- 1827-1830: Rentekammeret
- 1830-1866: Benjamin Wolff
- 1866-1906: Hans Christian Theodor Wolff-Sneedorf
- 1906-1925: Gerner Wolff-Sneedorf
- 1925-1956: Knud Wolff-Sneedorf
- 1956-1976: Aage Wolff-Sneedorf
- 1976-present: Gerner Wolff-Sneedorf
