= Peter Kurrild-Klitgaard =

Danish political scientist (born 1966)

Peter Kurrild-Klitgaard R, CStJ, FSA, FRHistS (born 1966) is a Danish political scientist with a particular interest in public choice analysis and classical liberalism.

== Education and employment ==
Kurrild-Klitgaard holds the degrees of Ph.D. in political science, M.Sc. (Cand.phil.) in social science and a B.A. from the University of Copenhagen, and an M.A. in political science from Columbia University.

His current position is as Professor of General and Comparative Political Science at the Department of Political Science, University of Copenhagen, where he has held various positions since 1991, and where he specializes in political institutions, political economy and American politics, especially issues such as elections, voting systems and constitutions. Before his current appointment, he was professor (2005–06) and associate professor (2000–05) at the Dept. of Political Science and Public Management, University of Southern Denmark and assistant professor at the Dept. of Political Science, University of Aarhus (1998–2000). He has held visiting appointments at several institutions, including Saint Edmund's College at University of Cambridge, Nuffield College at Oxford University, the Institute for Social and Economic Research and Policy at Columbia University, the Dept. of Economics, New York University, and the Institute for Humane Studies, George Mason University.

Kurrild-Klitgaard has served as a member and vice president of the Danish government's National Social Science Research Council and been the representative of Danish social science in the European Science Foundation. He is (since 2026) an alternate member of the Danish National Court of Impeachment, elected by the Danish Parliament.

Kurrild-Klitgaard is the recipient of the Fyens Stiftstidende's Research Award (2003), and as a graduate student at Columbia University he was a Fulbright Scholar and a Claude R. Lambe Fellow. He was chosen as the University of Copenhagen's "Teacher of the Year" (2007).

He has been elected a Fellow of the Society of Antiquaries of London, the Royal Historical Society, a member of the Academia Europaea (the European academy of sciences), the Philadelphia Society and the Mont Pelerin Society, and has served as vice president of the latter.

== Academic publications ==
Kurrild-Klitgaard's research is primarily focused on comparative politics and political economy and to a smaller extent also political theory. Specific areas of research include constitutional systems, voting methods and electoral systems, public spending and classical liberalism, especially as related to economic growth. In these areas, he has been much influenced by the late economist Gordon Tullock.

Kurrild-Klitgaard has published close to a hundred articles in anthologies and academic journals such as, e.g., European Journal of Political Economy, Public Choice, Research and Politics, Scandinavian Political Studies, Constitutional Political Economy, Journal of Institutional and Theoretical Economics, American Journal of Economics and Sociology, etc. He is also the author or co-author of several books, most recently Demokrati i totalstaten (2020), Individ, Stat og Marked: Studier i Rationalitet og Politik (2005), Bushs Amerika (2005) og Adam Smith: Økonom, Filosof, Samfundstænker (2004), and he has edited and co-authored such books as Partier og Partisystemer i Forandring (2008), The Dynamics of Intervention (2005), Valg, Vælgere og Velfærdsstat (2000), Etik, Marked og Stat: Liberalismen fra Locke til Nozick (1992), and Farvel til Socialstaten: En Bog om Privatisering (1988). He has also contributed to many anthologies, including Encyclopedia of Public Choice (2004), Den Store Danske Encyklopædi and the Encyclopedia of Libertarianism.

He has worked with several academic journals, and currently (since 2005) is European Editor of Public Choice and is or has been a member of the Editorial Boards of Scandinavian Political Studies, International Encyclopedia of Political Science, Journal des Economistes et des Etudes Humaines, Journal of Private Enterprise and the Journal of Libertarian Studies.

== Public debate ==
Kurrild-Klitgaard writes as a columnist and commentator for the daily newspaper Berlingske Tidende (1998–2002, 2004-2016, and again from 2018), previously for Børsen (2016-2018), Politiken (2003–04) and Dagen (2002). At Berlingske Tidende he was one of the contributors to the widely read daily column Groft Sagt (2006-2016). In annual surveys conducted since 2011 by the daily Politiken he has been included among the 100 most influential Danish opinion makers.

Kurrild-Klitgaard is regularly used as a speaker outside academia, and he is used so frequently by TV, radio and newspapers as a commentator on Danish and US politics that he is among the most prolific political scientists in Denmark.)

In 2005 Kurrild-Klitgaard founded the academic group-weblog Punditokraterne, which according to Politiken (October 2006) and Altinget.dk (March 2006) soon became one of the most widely read and respected Danish blogs.

== Organizations ==
Peter Kurrild-Klitgaard has held positions in a number of academic organizations, including as president of the Danish Political Science Association (2002–05), member of the Board of the Nordic Political Science Association, of the European Public Choice Society and of the Council of the International Political Science Association, as well as on the advisory board of the public policy think-tank CEPOS of which he was one of the initiators, co-founders and directors (2004–05, 2012–14). He was a board member of the Mont Pelerin Society 2006–10 and its vice president (2008–10) and currently serves as a board member of the Danish government's Danish Institute for Parties and Democracy.

He is a Freeman of the City of London and a Liveryman of the Worshipful Company of Scriveners. He belongs to The New Club (Edinburgh), Travellers' Club (London), Puffin's Club and Nya Sällskapet (Stockholm).

== Heraldry and genealogy ==
Peter Kurrild-Klitgaard has a longstanding interest in heraldry and genealogy and served as president of the Scandinavian Heraldry Society (2009-2018) and of the Danish Heraldry Society (2010-2018). He has been elected a corresponding member of the Royal Academy of Heraldry and Genealogy of Madrid and a member of the Academie Internationale d'Heraldique and since 2022 is the secretary general of the latter.

== Decorations ==
- United Kingdom: Commander of the Venerable Order of Saint John (2022).
- Denmark: Knight of the Order of the Dannebrog (2017).
- Sovereign Military Order of Malta: Officer Cross (Civilian Class) of the Order pro Merito Melitensi (2018).
- Vatican City State: Cross of Merit of the Order of the Holy Sepulchre (2014).
- Germany: Knight of Justice of the Johanniterorden (2014); Knight of Honour (2007).
