= Lilliendal =

Danish manor house

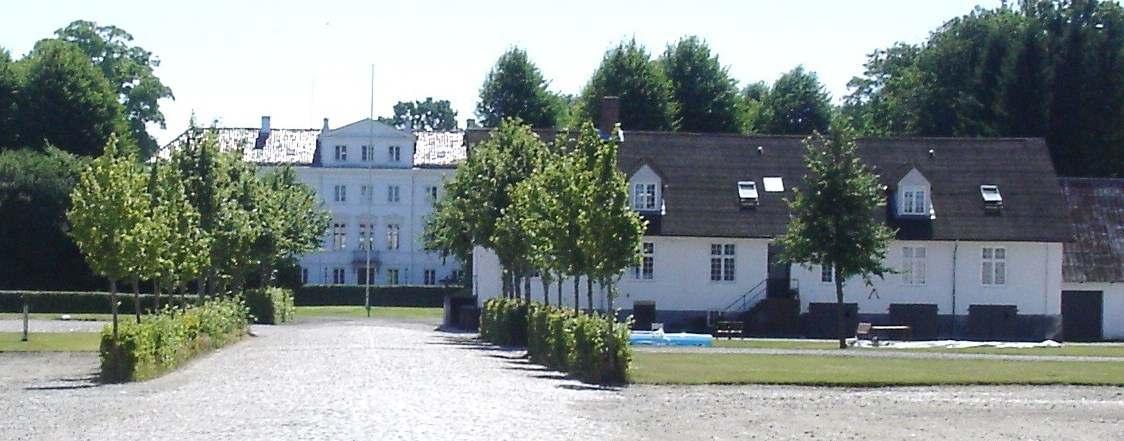
- The main building
- Interactive map of the Lilliendal area

General information
- Architectural style: Neoclassical
- Location: Lilliendal 1, 4735 Mern, Denmark
- Coordinates: 55°1′53″N 12°3′26″E
- Completed: 1765
- Client: Hans Gustav Lillienskiold

Lilliendal is a manor house and estate located at Vordingborg in southeastern Denmark. The estate covers approximately 800 hectares of mostly farmland. Lilliendal was established by Hans Gustav Lillienskiold (1727–1796) in the 1760s and later owned by the Knuth family for almost two hundred years from the 1800s to 1994. A relatively small main building from 1765 was expanded in the 1850s and again in 1919.

== History ==
=== Hans Gustav Lillienskiold ===
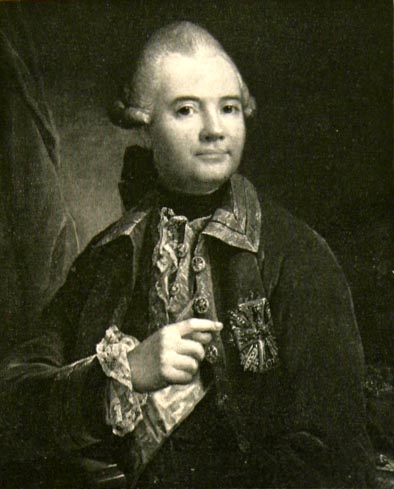
Hans Gustav Lillienskiold

Lilliendal was established by Hans Gustav Lillienskiold (1727–1796) in the 1760s. The estate replaced a village called Skuderup which in the 17th century consisted of ten farms and four houses. The largest of the farms, Skuderupgaard, is first mentioned in 1664 when it was owned by Anne Gjordes. It changed hands many times before it was acquired by Hans Gustav Lillienskiold in 1760.

The rest of Skuderup had been included in Vordingborg Cavalry District in the 1710s, which was now divided into 12 estates and sold in auction. The auction took place at Vordingvorg Castle on 27 September. Two of these estates, Skuderup and Høvdingsgaard, were acquired by Lillienskiold. He then merged Skuderupgaard and Skuderup under the name Lilliendal.

Hans Gustav Lillienskiold was a naval officer. His maternal grandfather, Hans Hansen Smed (Schmidt)(1650-1703) had been ennobled under the surname Lillienskiold in 1776. He had met his first wife in lisabeth Sophie Charlotte de Malleville (1740–1768) the Danish West Indies. She was the daughter of planter Jean de Malleville and the younger sister of army officer and later Governor-General of the Danish West Indies Thomas de Malleville. It was this marriage that had provided him with the economic means to purchase the estates. His wife died on the Skuderupgaard estate in 1768. Lilienskiold was later married again two times, first to Mette Cathrine de Cederfeld and then to Sophie Charlotte von Helzen.

=== Reiersen and Uldall ===
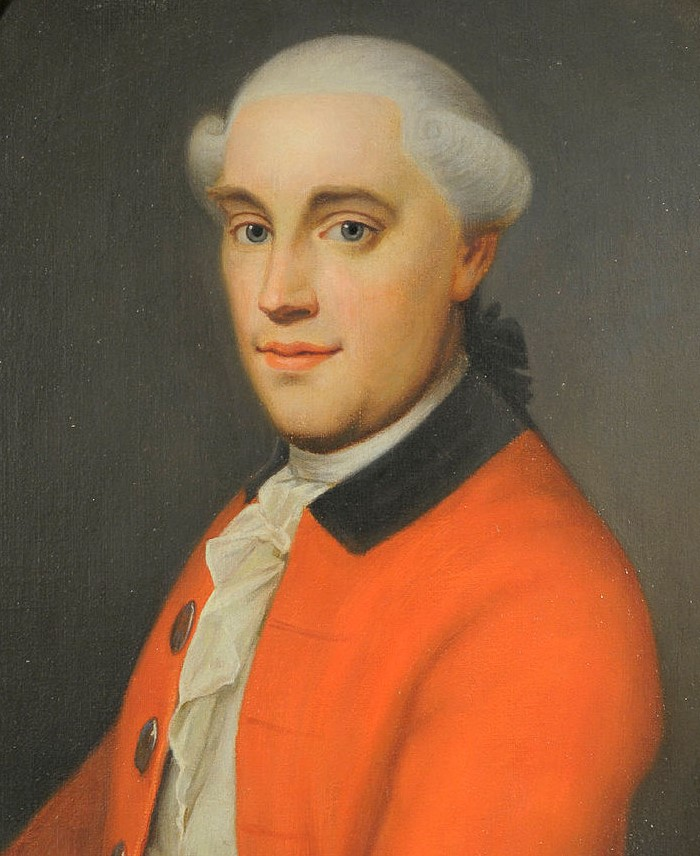
Niels Lunde Reiersen

In 1785 Lillienskiold sold Lilliendal to Niels Lunde Reiersen (1742-95), a wealthy merchant from Copenhagen, who already owned Nysø, Jungshoved and Oremandsgaard. Reiersen died unmarried in 1795. Lilliendal and Høvdingsgaard was then sold at auction to State Prosecutor General Peter Uldall. His intention was to establish a barony for his son but it had still not been realized when he died in 1798. Two years later his widow, Antoinette Hansen, sold Lilliendal to Thomas Bech.

=== Knuth family ===
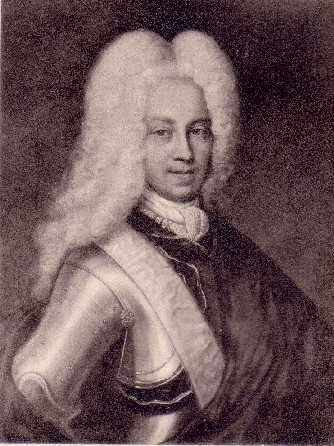
Adam Christopher Knuth

Adam Christopher Knuth (1755–1844) bought Lilliendal from Thomas Bech in 1802. Knuth was the first Baron of Christiansdal on Lolland. In 1704 he was granted royal permission to dissolve the barony and in 1821 to convert Lilliendal into a fideikommis (family trust). On his death, Lilliendal passed to his son Christian Frederik Knuth (1788-1852).. He was succeeded by his own son, Adam Knuth. He expanded the main building.

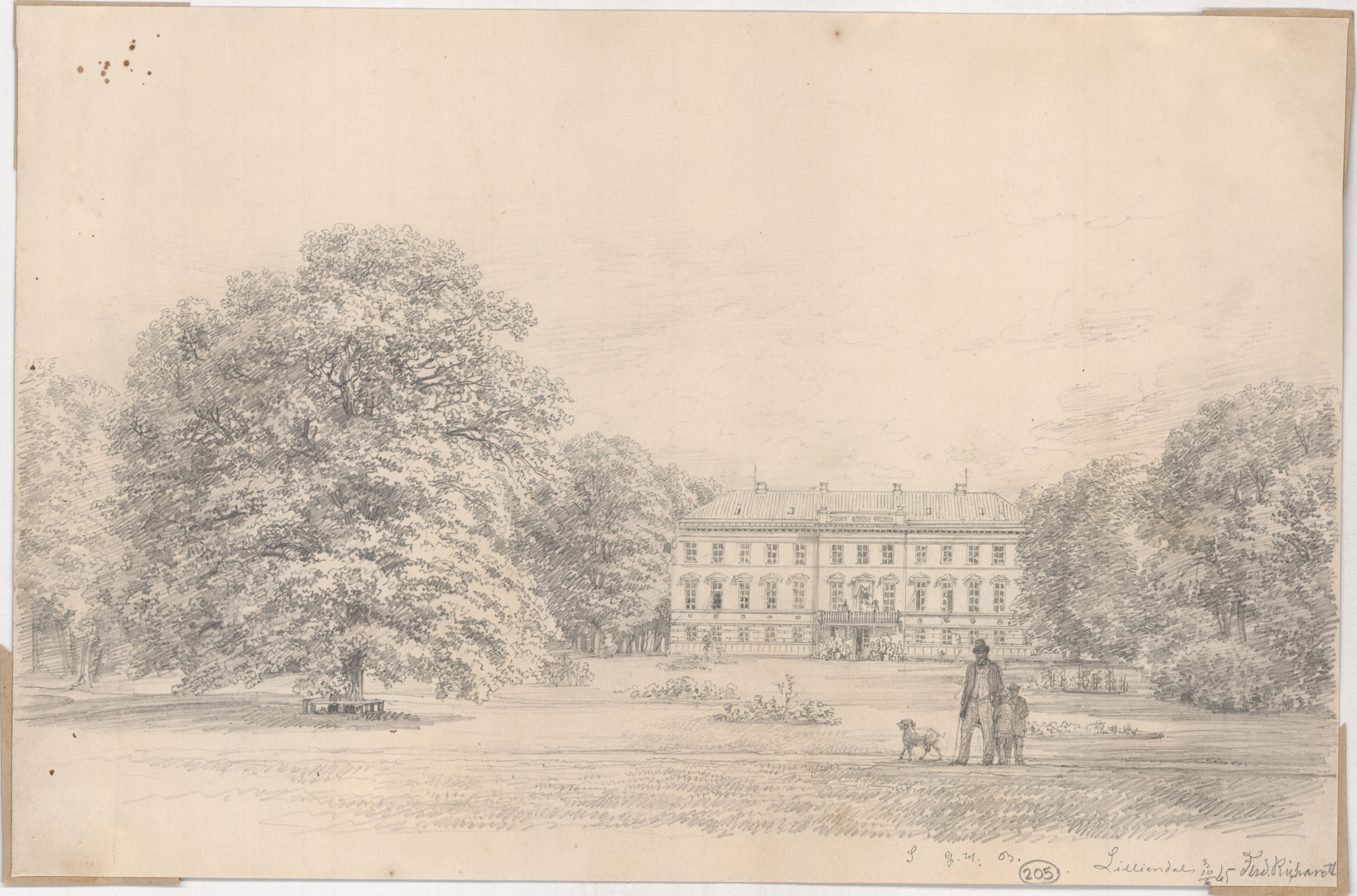
Ferdinand Richardt: Lilliendal, 1865.

Adam Knuth's son Christopher Knuth was active in politics, sold most of the remaining tenant farms to the tenant farmers as freeholds. The fideikommis was dissolved as a result of the lensaafløsningsloven of 1921. In 1936, Christopher Knuth ceded Lilliendal to his son Christian Knuth. Ulrich Knuth succeeded his father on the Lilliendal estate in 1950. In 1984, he sold the estate to Ted Kallehave in 1984. As oart of the contract, he lived there until his death in 2002.

== Architecture ==
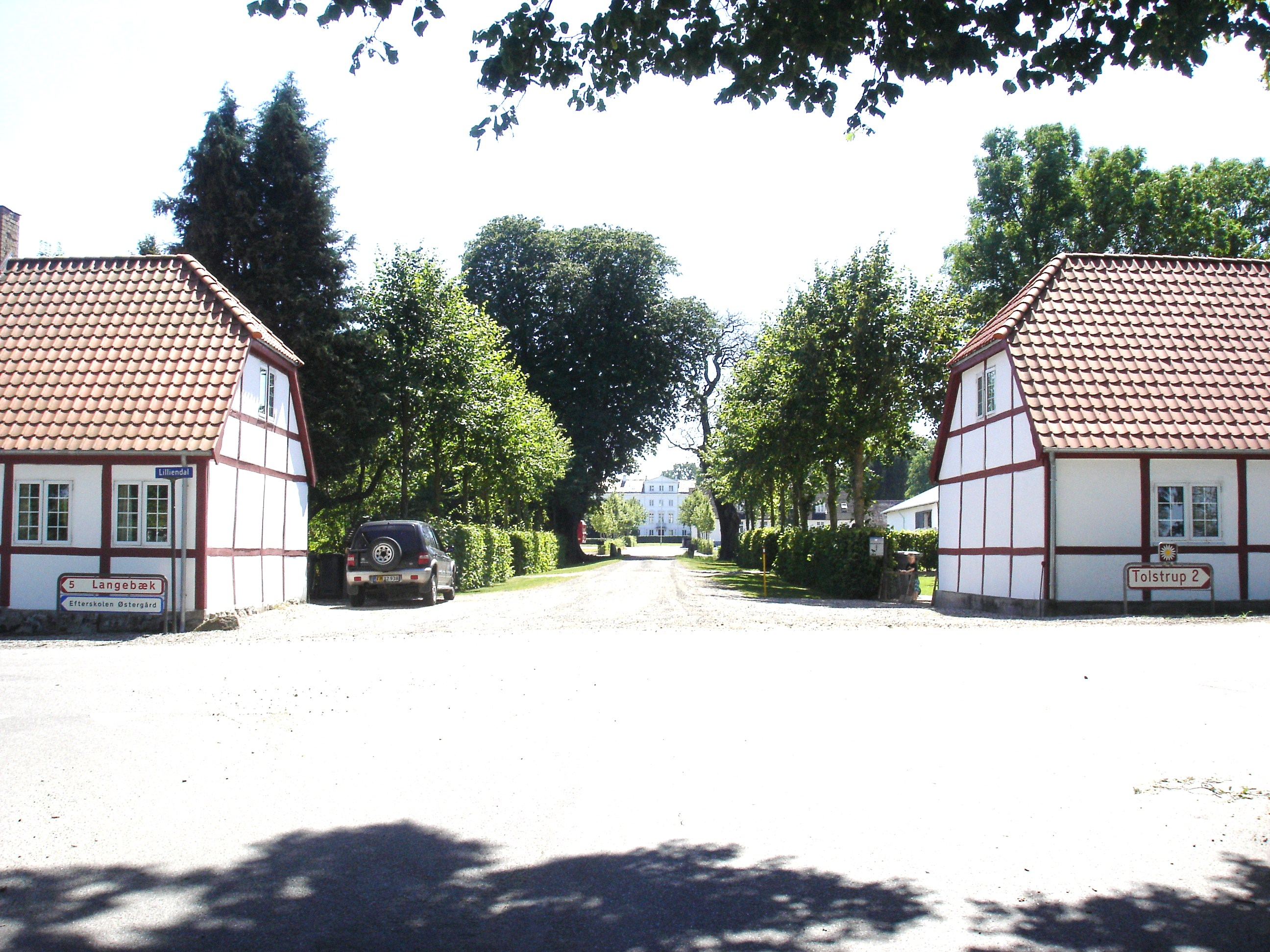
Some of the surrounding buildings

The core of the main building was built for Hans Gustav Lillienskiold in 1765. It was a yellow, single-story Empire-style building. It was adapted in the beginning of the 19th century and underwent major alterations after being taken over by Adam Knuth in 1852. He lengthened the building and added an extra floor, the roof was replaced by a more shallow, half hipped tile roof and the facade was decorated with robust cornices and triangular pediments above the windows on the second floor. The facade towards the garden features a median risalit with veranda topped by a triangular pediment. The building was again lengthened in 1919.

== List of owners ==
- (1664) Anne Gjordes
- (1688) Hendrich Heins
- ( -1726) Chr. Frantzen Toxsværd
- (1726-1730) Georg Segebaden
- (1730- ) Jørgen Poulsen Wetman
- ( -1741) Anne Hansdatter, gift Wetman
- (1741-1753) Johan Jacob Hæseker
- (1753-1757) Anna Margrethe Sprang, gift Enselin
- (1757-1758) Peder Quistgaard
- (1758-1760) Sophie Hedewig Ziemers
- (1760-1785) Hans Gustav Lillienskiold
- (1785-1795) Niels Lunde Reiersen
- (1795-1798) Peter Uldall
- (1798-1800) Antoinette Hansen, gift Uldall
- (1800-1802) Th. Bech
- (1802- ) Adam Christopher Knuth
- ( -1852) Christian Frederik Knuth
- (1852-1897) Adam Knuth
- (1897-1936) Christopher Knuth
- (1936-1963) Christian Frederik Knuth
- (1963-1994) Ulrich Knuth
- (1994- ) Ted Kallehave

== Other sources ==
- Elith Reumert (2017) Den danske skueplads' historie fra dens oprindelse i 1722 til 1900 (Lindhardt og Ringhof) ISBN 9788711581087
