= Mern =

- town
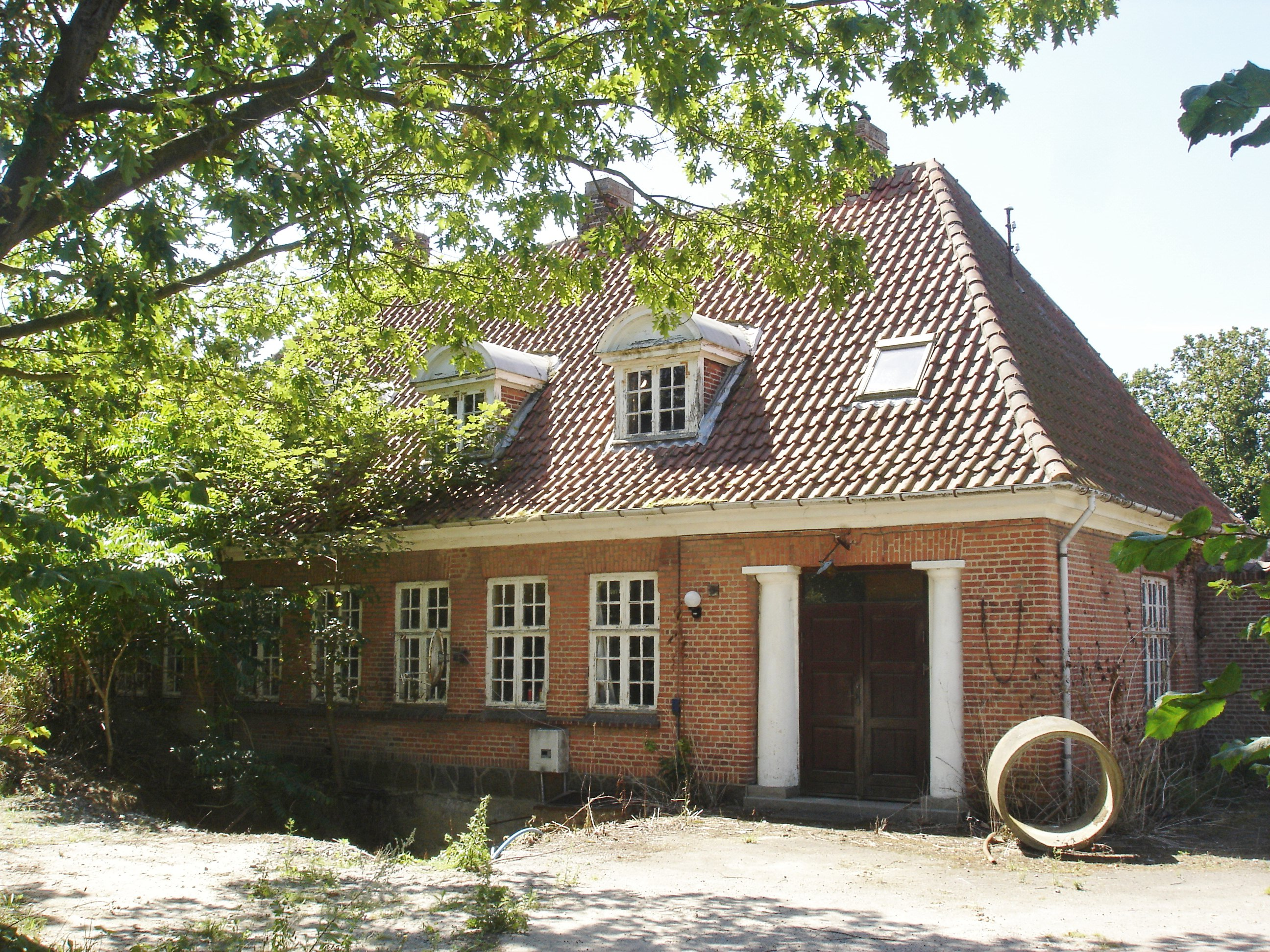
- The former railway station in Mern

- Location in Denmark Mern (Denmark Region Zealand)
- Coordinates: 55.04841°N 12.05678°E
- Country: Denmark
- Region: Zealand (Sjælland)
- Municipality: Vordingborg

Area
  - Urban: 0.74 km^{2} (0.29 sq mi)

Population (2026)
  - Urban: 961
  - Urban density: 1,300/km^{2} (3,400/sq mi)
- Time zone: UTC+1 (CET)
  - Summer (DST): UTC+2 (CEST)
- Postal code: DK-4735 Mern

Mern is a village with a population of 961 (1 January 2026) located in Vordingborg Municipality, Region Zealand in Denmark.

The village is a former Railway town at the Næstved-Præstø-Mern Railroad which was closed in 1961.

== Mern church ==
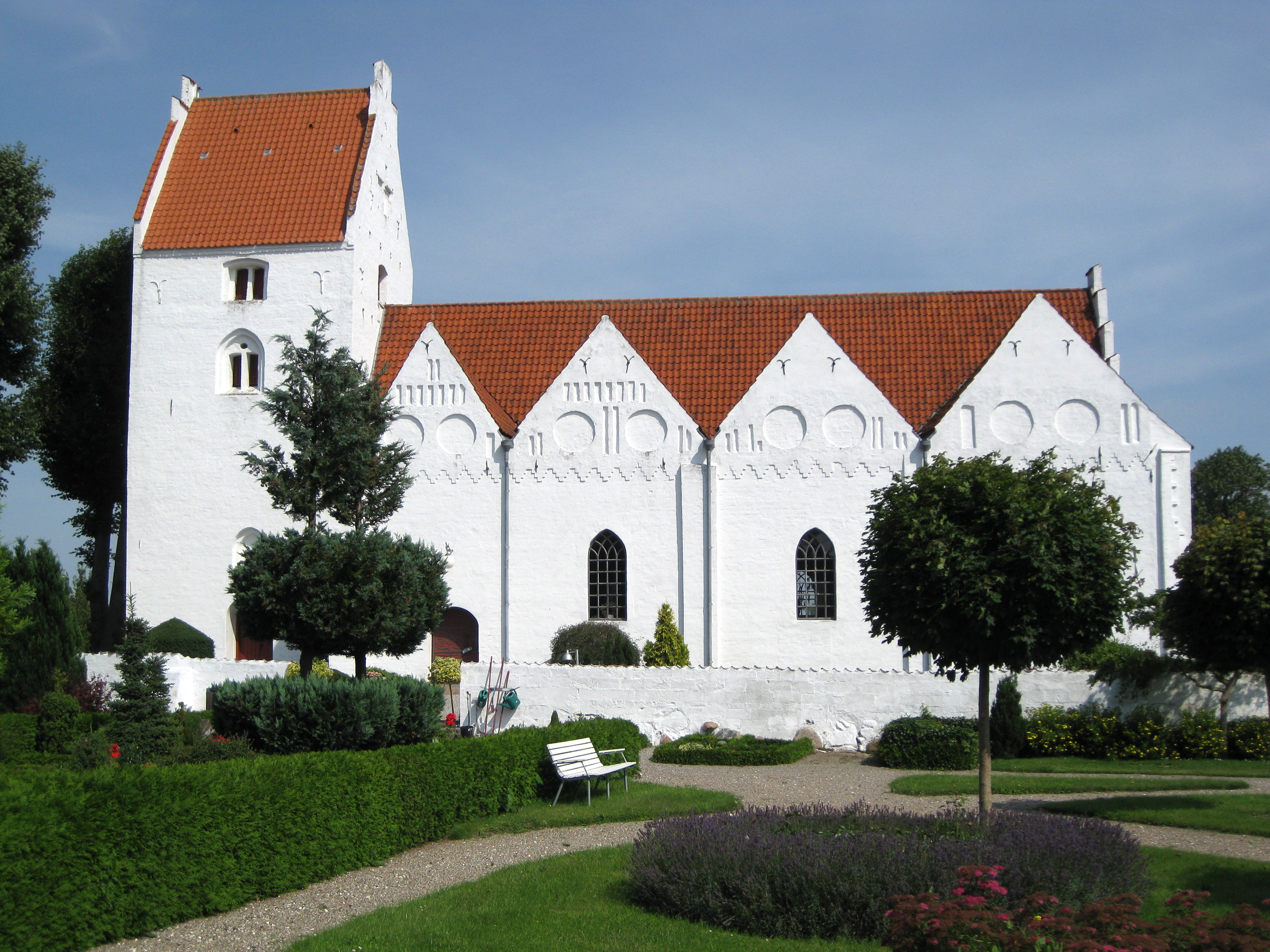
Mern church

Mern church was originally a Romanesque brick-covered church, later rebuild and extended, now as a white-washed village church. The church has 4 south chapels from approximately 1510-20, the tower somewhat later.

== The Mern meteorite ==
In the early afternoon, 29. August 1878, a 4.6 kg meteoritic stone fell from the sky with the impact point just east of Mern. The Mern meteorite is the most massive meteorite of the only 4 clearly witnessed meteorite falls (all stones) recovered in Denmark.

== Notable people ==
- Line Luplau (1823 in Mern - 1891) a Danish feminist and suffragist.
- Anders Lassen, VC, MC & Two Bars (1920 in Høvdingsgaard estate, Mern Parish – 1945) a highly decorated Danish soldier, who was the only non-Commonwealth recipient of the British Victoria Cross in the WWII
