= Aldershvile Slotspark =

Public park in Bagsværd, Denmark

Coordinates: 55.7712°N 12.4524°E

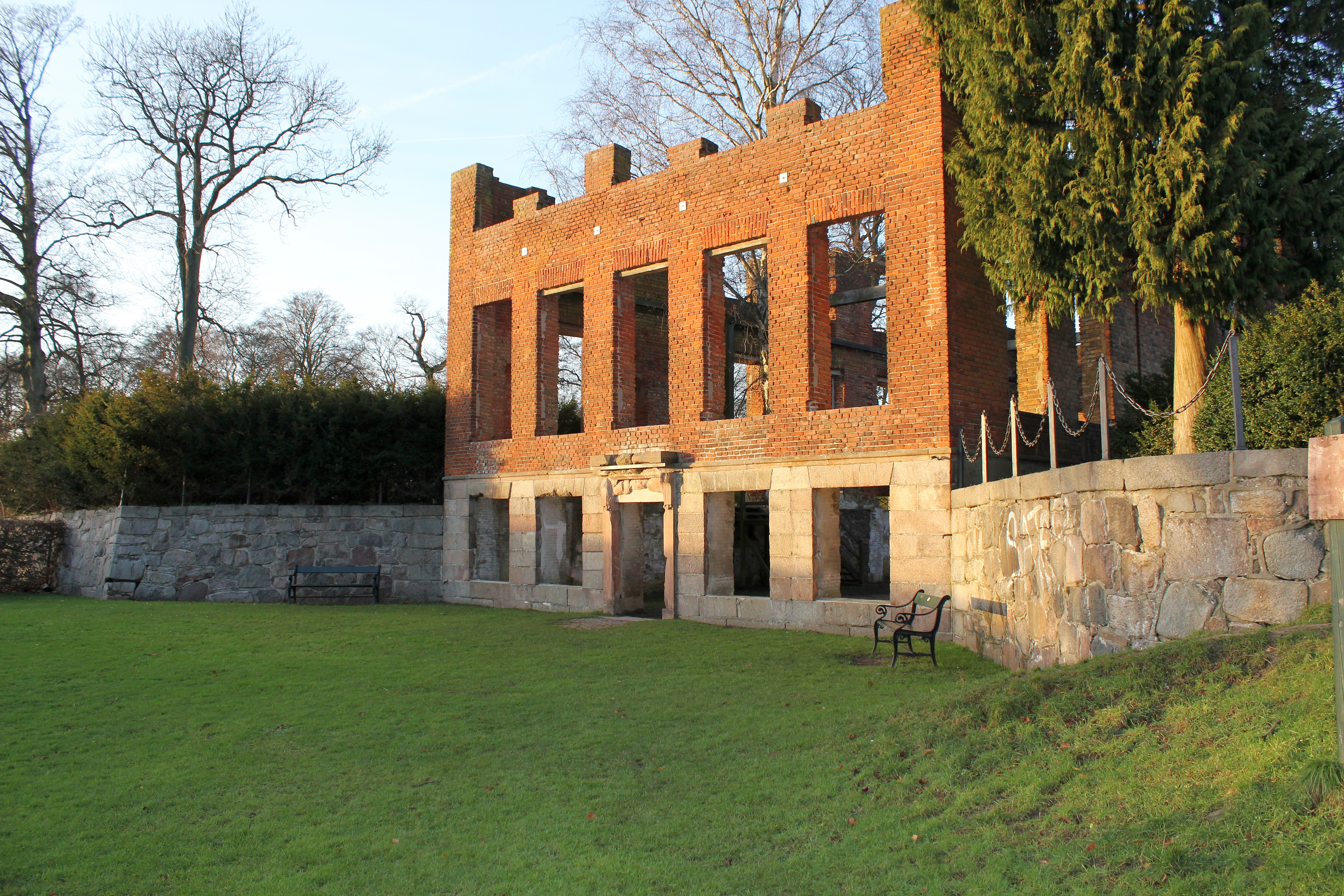
The ruin of the house

Aldershvile slotspark is a public park in Bagsværd, Gladsaxe Municipality, situated on the south side of Bagsværd Lake in the northwestern suburbs of Copenhagen, Denmark. Originally laid out as the Romantic gardens of a country house, Aldershvile, the park still contains the ruins of the main building, which was destroyed in a fire in 1909.

== History ==
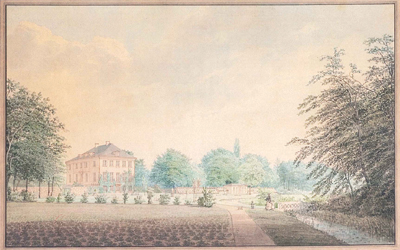
Aldershvile painted by Heinrich Gustav Ferdinand Holm in c. 1850

Aldershvile was built by Johan Theodor Holmskjold, who was director-in-chief both of the Royal Danish Postal Services and the Royal Porcelain Factory. In 1782, one year after his ennoblement, he commissioned the architect J.B. Guione to build him a new and larger country house as a replacement for his old country hose, Sophienholm, which he found had become too small. The house was not completed until 1790. It was a white building with a hipped roof clad in blue-glazed tiles. It was surrounded by a 12-hectare English-style landscaped garden with a canal system.

Johan Theodor Holmskjold died on 15 September 1793, not long after the completion of his new home. It turned out that he was heavily indebted and that he was guilty of embezzlement against both the Queen, the Postal Services and the Royal Porcelain Factory. The Aldershvile estate was subsequently sold to Adolph Ribbing, a Swedish count who had been exiled for his involvement in the murder of King Gustav III of Sweden.

In 1901, Aldershvile was purchased by Angelica von Sponneck, who became colloquially known as the Countess of Bagsværd. She had been born in poverty, gave birth to the daughter of an Imperial Count at the age of 19, married another man and moved to South Africa, then divorced and married Adolf Goerz, the owner of a diamond mine, who died from tuberculosis in 1900. about 1804, Aldershvile was sold to Peter Nicolaj Arbo, a wealthy timber merchant and landowner, who died on the property in 1827.

Back in Denmark, she bought Aldershvile and married the father of her child, Carl Sponneck but the marriage only lasted for two years. The house burned down in 1909 and was never rebuilt. She sold the site in 1911. Gladsaxe Municipality purchased the site in 1927.

== Description ==
The ruin is used as a location in the 1952 film Det store løb. The park consists of a mixture of lawns, meadows and forest areas.

== In popular culture ==
Aldershvile Slotspavillon has been used as a location in the Television series Matador.

== Owners of Aldershvile ==
- 1780-1794 Johan Theodor Holmskiold
- 1794-1804 Adolph Ribbing
- 1804 -? Peter Nicolai Arbo
- 1866-? Christian Hermann baron Stampe
- 1897-1900 S.A. van der Aa Kühle
- 1900-1911 Angelica rigsgrevinde von Sponneck
- 1911-1917 Gustav Meyer
- 1917-1927 Carl Olesen
- 1927-nu Gladsaxe Kommune
