= Peter Nicolaj Arbo =

Norwegian-Danish timber trader and landowner

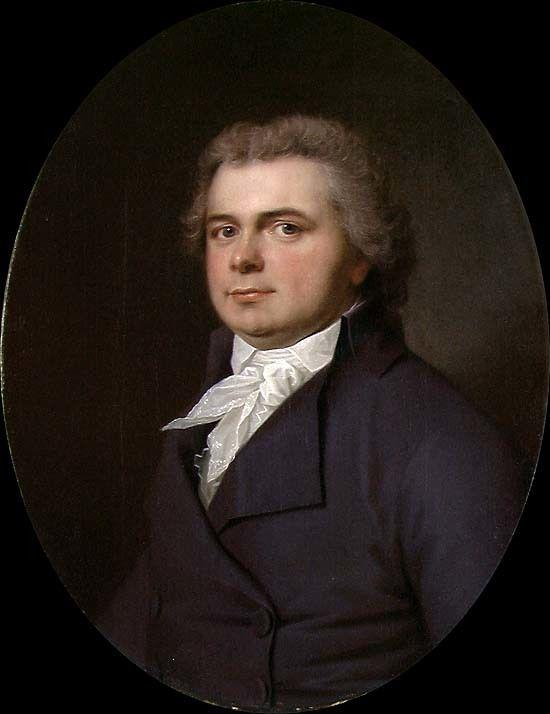
- Peter Nicolaj Arbo painted by Jens Juel
- Born: 16 November 1768; Strømsø, Norway
- Died: 12 September 1827 (aged 58); Aldershvile, Bagsværd, Denmark
- Occupations: Merchant and landowner
- Spouse: Anne Cathrine Collett

Peter Nicolaj Arbo (16 November 1768 – 12 September 1827) was a Norwegian-Danish timber trader and landowner. He owned the estates Aldershvile, Lundbygård and Oremandsgaard in Denmark and Gulskogen Manor in Norway.

== Early life ==
Arbo was born in Strømsø, Drammen, Norway. His parents were Johannes Petersen Arbo and Anne Cathrine Arbo née Friisenberg.

== Career ==
Arbo entered Collett & Sæn through his marriage to Anne Cathrine Collett. Founded by James Collett in Christiania in the 1690s, it had become the largest timber trading company in Norway and was also active in the shipping industry. Arbo later moved to Copenhagen where he was also active in the timber industry.

== Property ==
Arbo acquired Gulskogen Manor at Drammen in Norway in 1794.

He owned the Peschier House at Holmens Kanal 12 in Copenhagen as well as the country house Villa Sans Souci in Frederiksberg. In 1804, he purchased Aldershvile in Bagsværd. In 1824, he acquired the estates Lundbygård and Oremandsgaard at Præstø on the southern part of Zealand.
