= Bernt Johan Collet =

Danish politician and farmer

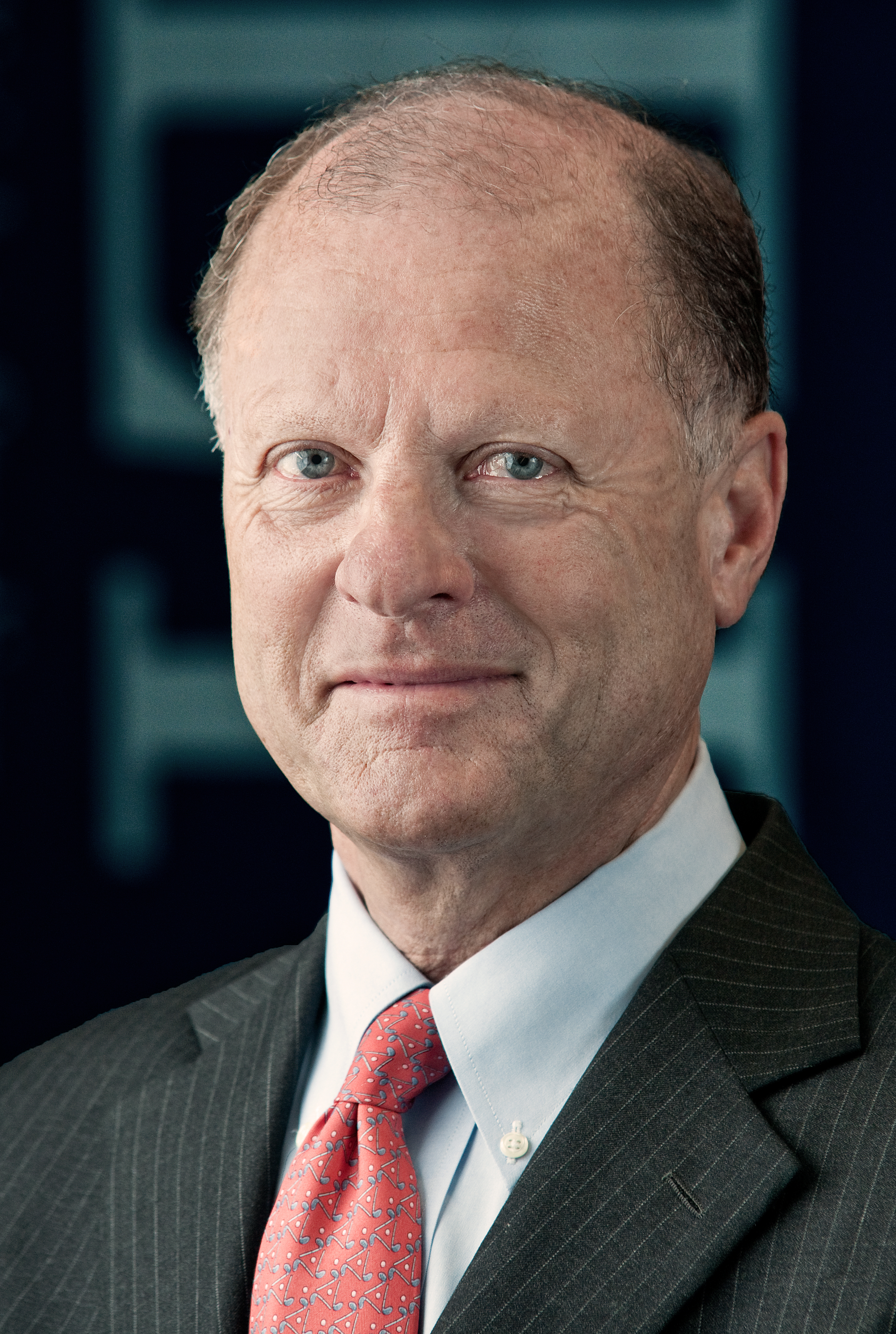
Bernt Johan Collet, 2011

Bernt Johan Holger Collet (born 23 November 1941) is a Danish politician and farmer. He is the eldest son of Chamberlain and Master of the Royal Hunt, M.Sc. (Econ), Harald Collet and landscape architect Else Collett.

He served as defense minister in the Cabinet of Poul Schlüter II. Today, he is chairman and CEO of Collet & Co. and serves as a Chamberlain at Her Majesty's Court and is Master of the Royal Hunt. In 2004, Bernt Johan Collet co-founded the Danish think-tank Center for Political Studies (CEPOS). He serves as chairman of the Board of CEPOS.

== Early life ==
Collet graduated from Herlufsholm kostskole in 1960. He served in the Royal Lifeguards from 1960 and has since 1964 served as First Lieutenant of the reserve. He trained at Naesgaard Agricultural College and at large estates 1962–1965. In 1967 he graduated from the Business School of Copenhagen. In the years 1969-1971 he worked with General Mills, Inc., U.S.A.

In 1967, he took over the family estate, Lundbygaard and has run it since 1971 along with his work in industry, retail trade and a number of organizations.

== Political career ==
Collet was elected to the Danish Parliament in 1981 and served there until 1990. During his time in parliament he was appointed spokesman for the Conservative People's Party on business affairs and on agricultural affairs. In the period 1984-1987 he was the Conservative leader in the Parliament's Finance Committee, and he was a member of the EU Committee 1982–1987. He served as Minister of Defense 1987-1988 and 1988-1990 as Chairman of the Parliament's Committee for Agriculture, Forests, and Fisheries. In 1988 he was a member of the Nordic Council. In 1989 Mr. Collet was a Danish delegate to the United Nations and in 1990 he was appointed international observer of the first democratic elections in Romania. In 1990 Mr. Collet resigned his posts in the Danish Parliament to return to his work in business.

He held the position as chairman of Herlufsholm boarding school 1990–1994, and 1998-2004 he was a member of the Board of Trustees of Copenhagen Business School. Among other things he is the chairman of the Association of Danish Business Graduates (20,000 members) and the Nordic and International associations.

== Personal life ==
Bernt Johan Collet is married to psychologist, phil. cand. Catharina Collet. She is the European vice chairman of Europa Nostra, an organization that promotes conservation of the buildings’ and landscapes’ heritage of Europe.

Collet is the co-author of "The History of Denmark 1945-82", published 1984.

In 2010 Collet was accused of converting 11 different protected prehistoric sites into farmland, but the case against him was dropped as the entrepreneur was held responsible. Again in 2012, Ministry of Culture (Denmark) reported Collet to the police for damaging a prehistoric gravesite from the Stone Age. In the 2014 court case Collet was eventually acquitted, however the ministry reestablished the grave at his expense. In 2017 he lost an appeal case in Denmark's Eastern High Court, which however lowered the cost imposed for reconstruction of the grave by approx. 20 pct.

Political offices
Preceded by Hans Engell	Defence Minister of Denmark; 1987–1988	Succeeded by Knud Enggaard
