= Niels Lunde Reiersen =

Danish merchant

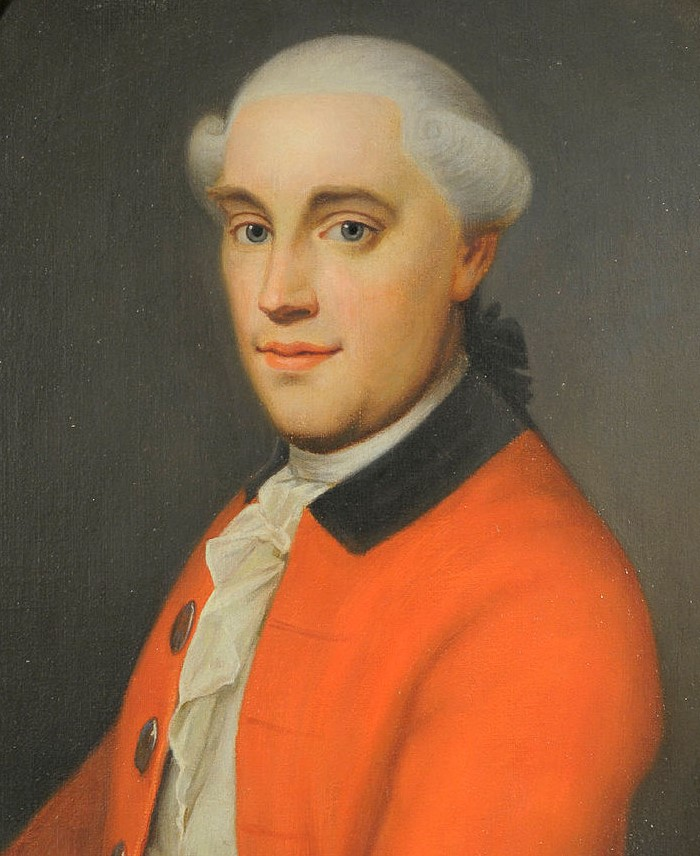
- Reiersen painted by Erik Pauelsen in 1784
- Born: 16 February 1742; Copenhagen, Denmark
- Died: 20 July 1795 (aged 53); Copenhagen, Denmark
- Occupations: Merchant, industrialist and shipowner

Niels Lunde Reiersen (16 February 1742 - 20 July 1795) was a Danish government official, merchant, silk manufacturer, landowner and philanthropist. He was the owner of the Royal Danish Silk Manufactury in Copenhagen (1775-1796) as well as a founding partner of the leading trading firm De Coninck & Reiersen (1775-1790). Reiersen owned Nysø Manor, Oremandsgaard Manor and Lilliendal Manor as well as the estates at Jungshoved and Høfdinggård on Southern Zealand.

== Early life ==
Reiersen was born in Copenhagen, the son of bookkeeper Peter Reiersen (1713–1773) and Anna Elisabeth Lunde (1719–1779). He went to sea as a cabin boy before returning to Copenhagen where he was apprenticed to his father in 1760.

== Government official ==
In 1763, Reiersen accompanied a selection of goods to Toruń in Poland. He was in 1768 appointed as bookkeeper and cashier in connection with a reorganization of Varemagasinet. In 1769, he became a member of a commission which was to oversee the country's factories. In 1774, Reiersen was appointed as factory commissioner with special responsibility for Copenhagen. In 1777, he was appointed as one of the directors of Varemagasinet. When it closed the following year, Reiersen was granted the title etatsråd and appointed a member of the factory commission ( Fabrikdirektionen).

== Merchant and industrialist ==
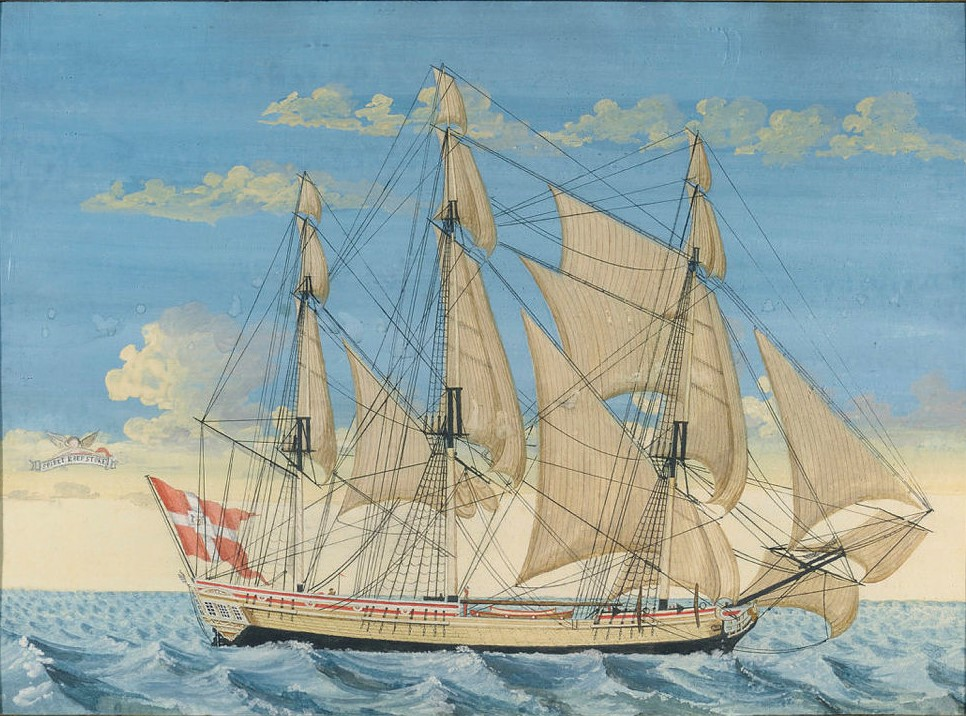
De Coninck & Reiersen's ship Roepstorff, c. 1780

In early 1775, Reiersen acquired the Royal Danish Silk Manufactury (Den Kongelige Silkemanufaktur) of which his father had become a co-owner in 1760. In 1786, Hans Brandorph joined him as partner.

In 1775–1790, Reiersen joined Dutch merchant Frédéric de Coninck (1740–1811) as a partner in the trading firm De Coninck & Reiersen. The company took over the remains of the Baltic-Guinea Company (Det det Østersøisk-Guineiske Kompagni in 1787.

== Property ==
Reiersen acquired the estates Nysø Manor, Jungshoved and Oremandsgaard in 1783. In 1785, he also purchased Lilliendal, Høfdinggård and Skuderupgård.

== Legacy ==
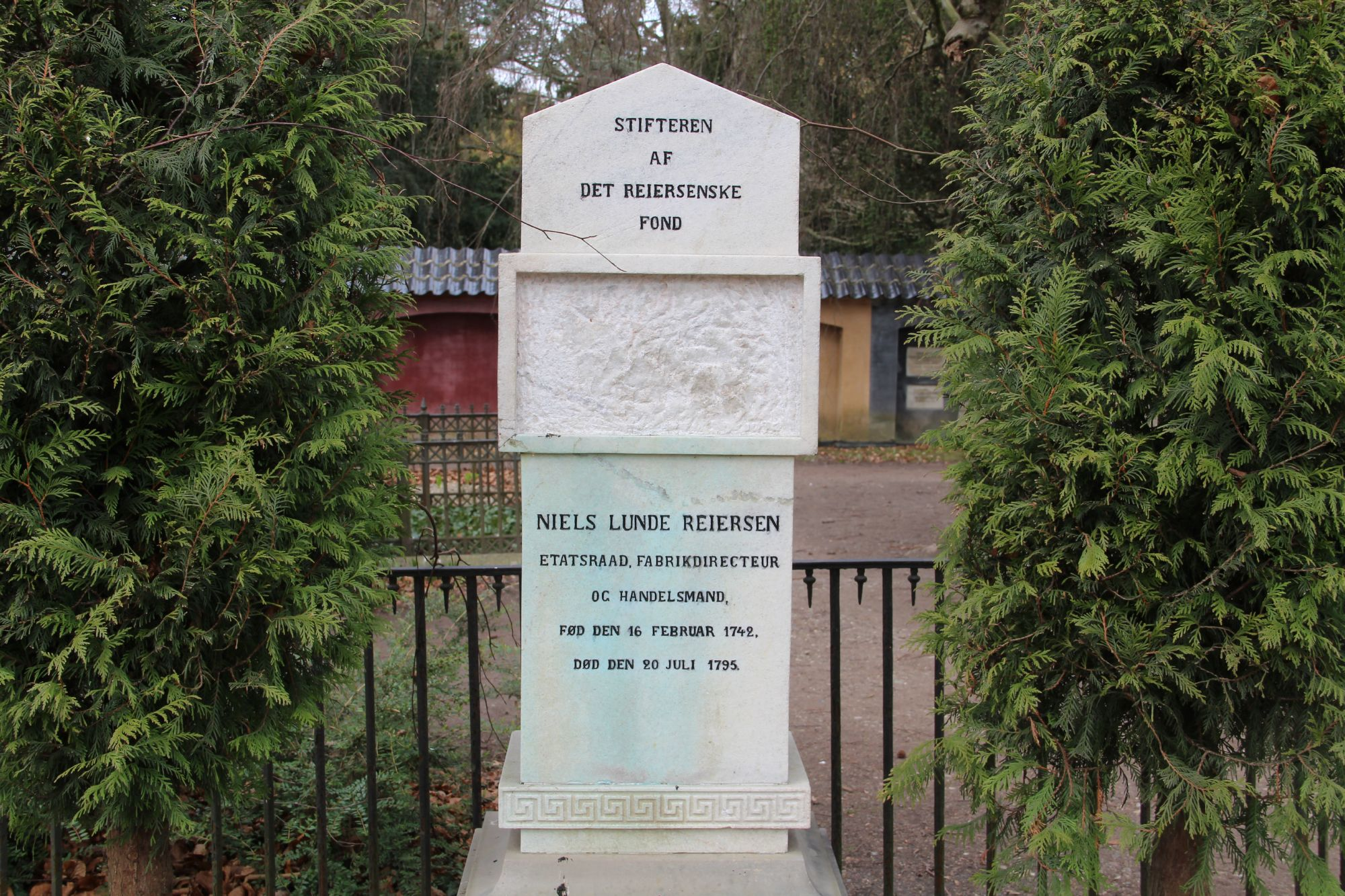
Reiersen's tomb at Assistens Cemetery in Copenhagen.

Reiersen remained unmarried. He died on 20 July 1795 and was buried at Assistens Cemetery in Copenhagen.

By testament of 30 March 1793, Reiersen left behind his wealth and possessions to Den Reiersenske Fond, a fund to "support the development and progress of industry, both through theoretical and practical measures, in Copenhagen and market towns on Zealand". He left approximately 499,000 Danish rigsdaler.
