= Oremandsgaard =

Estate in Vordingborg municipality, Denmark

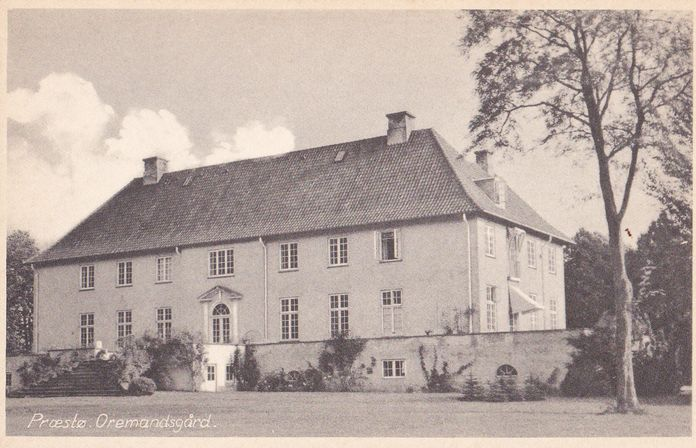
- Oremandsgaard shortly after it was rebuilt after a fire in 1933
- Interactive map of the Oremandsgaard area

General information
- Architectural style: Baroque
- Location: Vordingborg Municipality, Denmark
- Coordinates: 55°04′19″N 12°04′05″E
- Completed: 1833 (Ny Oremandsgaard)

Oremandsgaard is a manor house and estate located seven kilometres south of Præstø, Vordingborg Municipality, in southeastern Denmark. The estate traces its history back to the 14th century, but the current main building is from 1933. Oremandsgaard was acquired by Alfred Hage in 1861 and is currently owned by the fifth generation of the Hage family. It is one of the oldest organic farms in Denmark and plays host to an annual chamber music festival.

== History ==
=== Early history ===
Oremandsgaard is first mentioned in a letter of 1356, in which one "Pæther Bekære" cedes all his farms and the village of Gedhærudh (Gederød) to Valdemar IV. It is unclear whether the estate was continuously owned by the crown over the next centuries. In 1721, it was included in Vordingborg Cavalry District. It is believed that the main building was destroyed during the Dano-Swedish War in 1658–1660 due to finds of rubble and weapons in the surrounding fields and also because this was the case for nearby Jungshoved.

=== 1651–1861: Changing owners ===
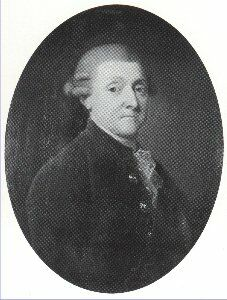
Henrik Brockenhuus

In 1761, some ten years before Vordingborg Cavalry District was dissolved, Frederick IV presented Oremandsgaard and nearby Jungshoved to Henrik Brockenhuus. A few years later, Brockenhuus also bought Nysø the much larger Nysø Manor.

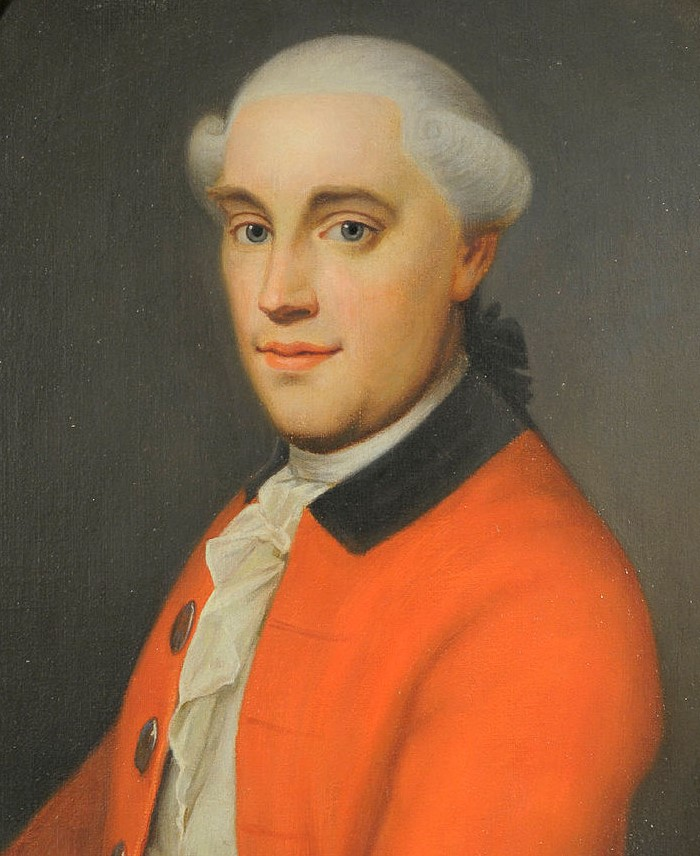
Niels Lunde Reiersen

In 1785, Nysø, Jungshoved and Oremandsgård were sold to Niels Lunde Reiersen. In 1775 he and his partner Frédéric de Coninck had founded a successful trading house. It participated in the Danish East and West Indies trade with its own fleet of merchant ships. Reisesen died in 1795. childless and unmarried. He left his entire estate to Det Reiersenske Fond. In 1796, Oremandsgaard was sold to Hans Petersen. At the auction of Vordingborg Cacalry Fistrict, back in 1774, he had already bought Engelholm (then (Skovbygård).

It was later divided into the estates Ny Oremandsgaard and Gammel Oremandsgaard (New and Old Oremandsgaard). In 1824, Oremandsgård was sold to the Norwegian timber trader Peter Nicolaj Arbo. He was married to Anne Cathrine Collett. She kept the estate after her husband's death. Having no children. she endowed it to her brother Peter Collet. He worked in the Danish foreign diplomacy, first in Stockholm and later in Constantinople.

=== 1861–present: The Hage family ===
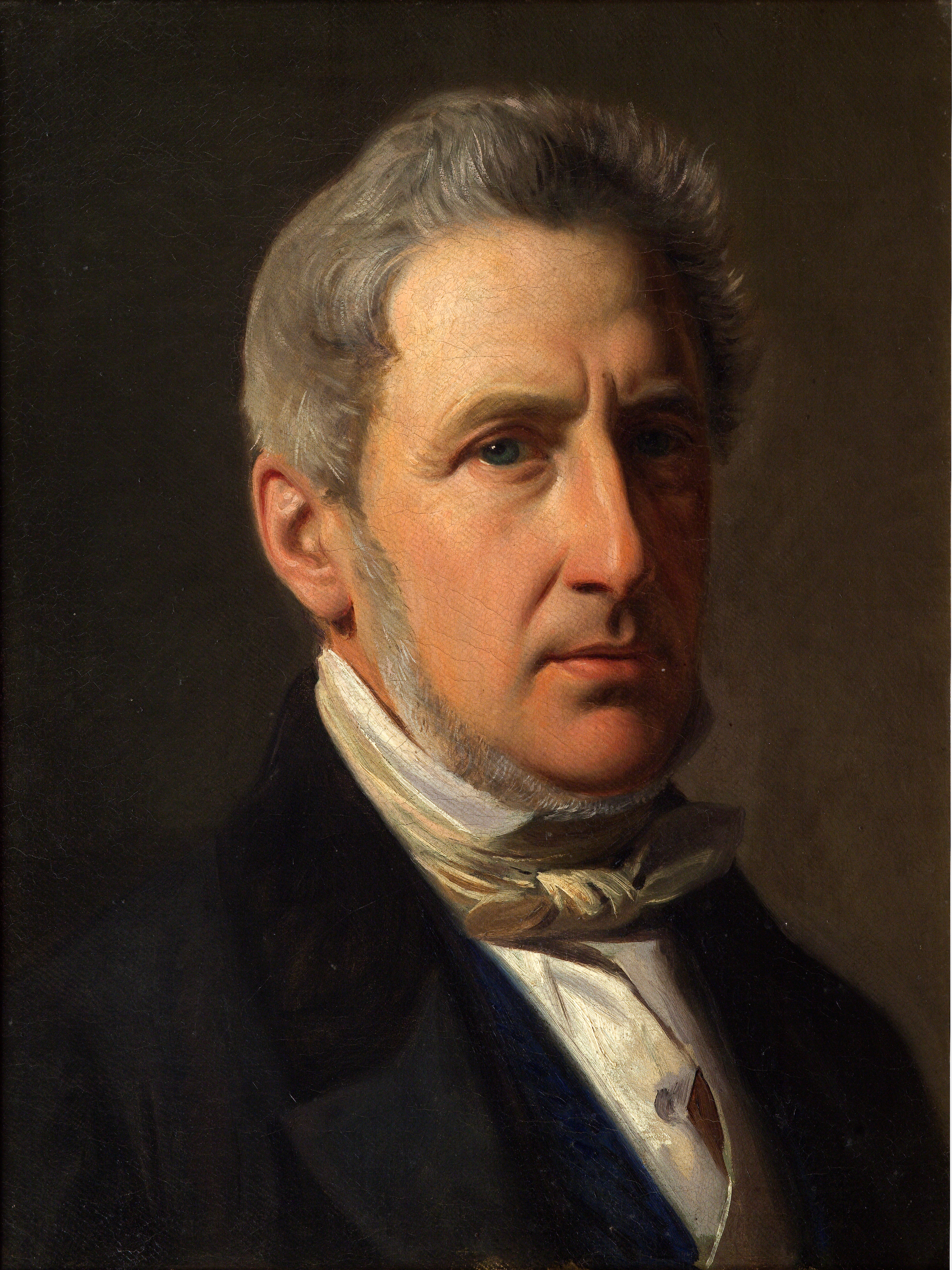
Alfred Hage

In 1861, Alfred Hage purchased Oremandsgaard. It comprised Ny Oremandsgaard, Gammel Oremandsgaard, Allerslev Church and 139 tenant farms. Hage demolished the existing buildings and constructed a new main building on the Ny Oremandsgaard estate.In 1862, he also purchased Nivaagaard north of Copenhagen.

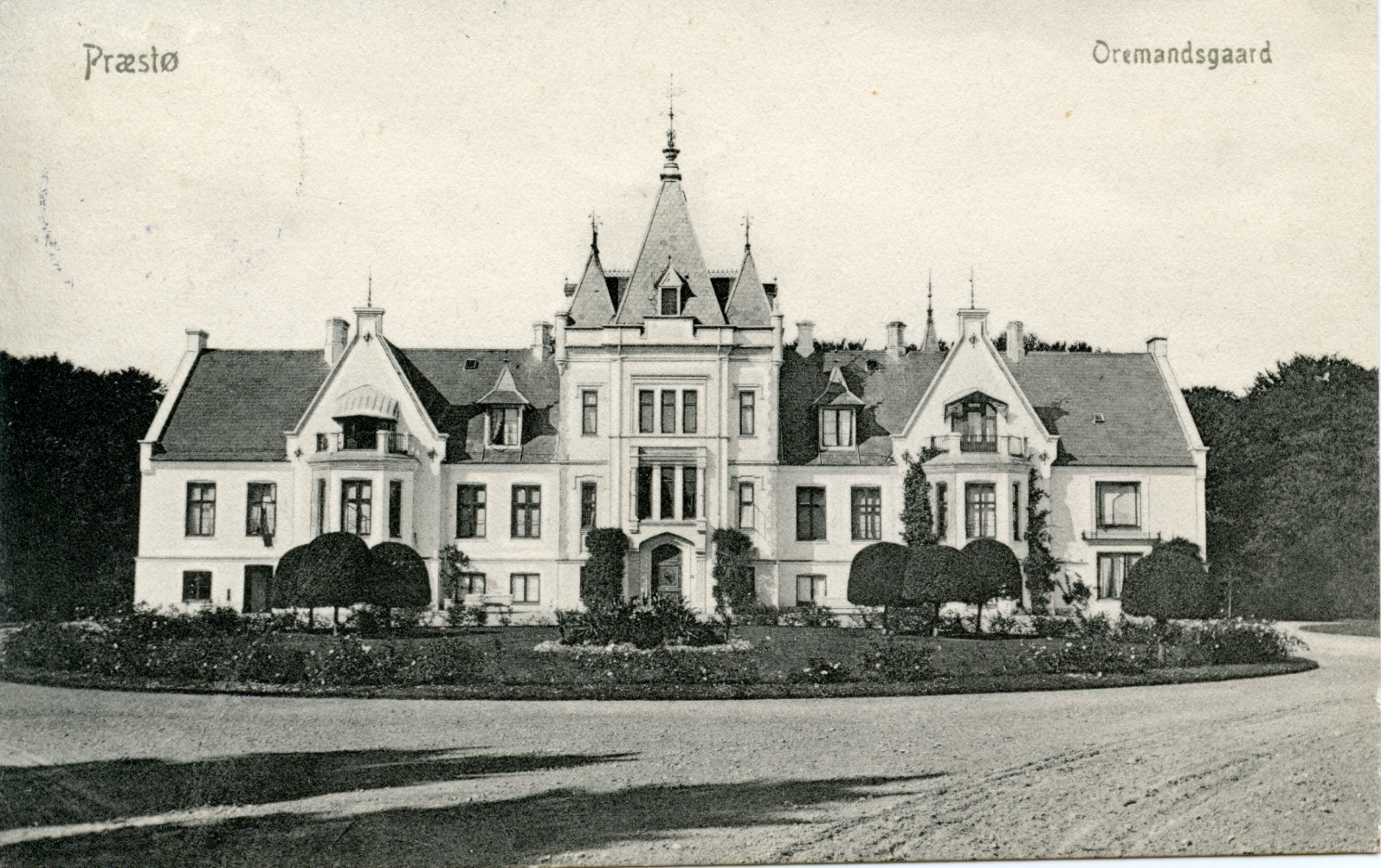
The main building from 1860

On Alfred Hage's death in 1872, Oremandsgaard passed to his son Alfred Peter Anton Hage. In the 1890s, he embarked on the work with converting the tenant farms into freeholds. This proces was not completed until 1919, making Oremandsgaard one of the last estates in Denmark to have tenant farms. The Hage family was known for their humane treatment of the peasants on their estates, building schools and hospitals and providing economic support for the sick.

In 1963, Oremandsgaard passed to Daniel Hage took over the estate at the age of 25. He became a pioneer of organic farming in Denmark.

== Today ==
The Oremandsgaard estate also comprises 20 other buildings that are rented out.

The Oremandsgaard estate covers 788 hectares of land (2011) of which 420 hectares are farmland and 362 hectares is covered by woodland. It is one of the oldest organically farmed estates in Denmark.

=== Chamber music festival ===
Oremandsgaard plays host to an annual chamber music festival. It takes place in late July, lasts for a week and features young promising chamber musicians from Denmark and abroad.

=== Oremandsgaard Destillery ===
Oremandsgaards Destilleri, a distillery, was established on the estate in 2019.

== List of owners ==
- (1330–1356) Peder Bekere
- (1356–1761) The Crown
- (1761–1785) Henrik Brockenhuus
- (1785–1795) Niels Lunde Reiersen
- (1796–1803) Hans Petersen
- (1803–1824) Peter Benedikt Petersen
- (1824–1827) Peter Nicolaj Arbo
- (1827–1846) Anne Cathrine Arbo née Collett
- (1846–1860) Peter Anker Collet
- (1861–1872) Alfred Hage
- (1872–1919) Alfred Peter Anton Hage
- (1919–1947) Christoffer Friedenreich Hage
- (1947–1963) Thyra Hage née Konow
- (1963–2013) Daniel Friedenreich Hage
- (2013– ) August Friedenreich Hage
