= 2021 Vordingborg municipal election =

← 2017	16 November 2021	2025 →

All 29 seats to the Vordingborg Municipal Council 15 seats needed for a majority
- Turnout: 25,589 (68.1%) ▼5.8pp
	First party	Second party	Third party
	A	V	C
Party	Social Democrats	Venstre	Conservatives
Last election	13 seats, 37.8%	8 seats, 26.7%	1 seat, 3.8%
Seats won	11	7	3
Seat change	▼2	▼1	▲2
Popular vote	8,921	5,695	2,790
Percentage	35.6%	22.7%	11.1%
Swing	▼2.2%	▼4%	▲7.3%
	Fourth party	Fifth party	Sixth party
	F	Ø	D
Party	Green Left	Red–Green Alliance	New Right
Last election	1 seat, 5.5%	1 seat, 5.1%	0 seats, 2.1%
Seats won	2	2	1
Seat change	▲1	▲1	▲1
Popular vote	1,962	1,828	1,064
Percentage	7.8%	7.3%	4.2%
Swing	▲2.3%	▲2.2%	▲2.1%
	Seventh party	Eighth party	Ninth party
	O	B	Æ
Party	Danish People's Party	Social Liberals	Fælleslisten
Last election	3 seats, 10.6%	1 seat, 2.9%	Did Not Stand
Seats won	1	1	1
Seat change	▼2	0	▲1
Popular vote	1,062	806	719
Percentage	4.2%	3.2%	2.9%
Swing	▼6.4%	▲0.3%	New
Mayor before election
Mikael Smed
Social Democrats
Mayor after election
Mikael Smed
Social Democrats

Prior to this election, and in the three elections since the 2007 municipal reform, no mayor had won re-election.

In the 2017 election, Mikael Smed, from the Social Democrats, won the mayor's position. The red bloc parties had won 17 of the 29 seats, so if the blue bloc wanted to take over the mayor's position, it required a net gain of 3 seats.

In the result, the Social Democrats kept the position as the largest party, but lost two seats. Fellow red bloc parties of the Green Left and Red–Green Alliance would however both gain a seat, and although The Alternative lost a seat, a total of 16 red seats was won. Therefore, it looked as though Mikael Smed was on his way to become the first re-elected in the municipality's history. (Note: counting the 4 elections since the 2007 municipal reform) It was eventually confirmed that he would have a second term.

== Electoral system ==
For elections to Danish municipalities, a number varying from 9 to 31 are chosen to be elected to the municipal council. The seats are then allocated using the D'Hondt method and a closed list proportional representation. Vordingborg Municipality had 29 seats in 2021

Unlike in Danish General Elections, in elections to municipal councils, electoral alliances are allowed.

== Electoral alliances ==
=== Electoral Alliance 1 ===
Party		Political alignment
A	Social Democrats	Centre-left
B	Social Liberals	Centre to Centre-left
F	Green Left	Centre-left to Left-wing
Ø	Red–Green Alliance	Left-wing to Far-Left
Å	The Alternative	Centre-left to Left-wing

=== Electoral Alliance 2 ===
Party		Political alignment
O	Danish People's Party	Right-wing to Far-right
Æ	Freedom List	Right-wing to Far-right

== Results by polling station ==
Division	A	B	C	D	F	O	V	Æ	Ø	Å
Division	%	%	%	%	%	%	%	%	%	%
Vordingborg	39.2	3.4	14.1	2.7	11.7	2.2	20.3	1.3	4.2	0.9
Masnedsund	38.4	3.9	12.5	3.6	10.7	4.1	20.3	1.2	4.6	0.6
Nyråd	32.2	4.4	15.9	2.6	10.3	2.6	24.6	1.2	5.5	0.6
Kastrup	36.9	2.8	14.3	3.9	10.2	4.2	20.4	0.9	5.5	0.8
Bårse	27.0	2.5	5.8	4.6	2.8	5.7	41.1	0.4	7.9	1.9
Lundby	28.6	2.2	19.9	7.3	7.4	7.8	20.6	0.9	4.6	0.6
Ørslev	35.2	1.6	10.2	4.1	10.0	9.7	23.7	2.2	2.7	0.5
Stege	34.1	4.3	6.0	3.4	4.4	2.9	25.7	9.2	9.1	0.9
Præstø	48.0	2.4	7.1	3.9	6.0	4.2	21.9	0.7	5.1	0.6
Bogø	28.7	2.7	11.9	4.2	6.9	3.0	17.2	1.5	23.3	0.5
Vestmøn	24.0	3.9	5.7	4.5	5.4	3.9	22.0	6.3	22.0	2.2
Østmøn	25.6	3.5	6.3	4.3	5.5	5.2	25.8	7.2	14.6	2.0
Allerslev	35.9	2.8	7.1	5.5	6.7	3.9	28.9	1.6	6.3	1.3
Jungshoved	45.0	4.3	7.8	5.0	9.3	3.9	15.2	1.9	5.6	1.9
Mern	33.0	1.9	14.6	5.5	7.3	5.0	24.1	1.6	5.9	1.2
Kalvehave	38.3	3.8	11.8	6.1	8.0	3.5	17.7	4.0	6.1	0.8
Stensved	39.3	2.0	12.2	5.6	6.2	4.5	23.8	1.7	3.7	1.0

== Results ==
Party		Votes	%	+/-	Seats	+/-
Vordingborg Municipality
A	Social Democrats	8,921	35.56	-2.23	11	-2
V	Venstre	5,695	22.70	-3.99	7	-1
C	Conservatives	2,790	11.12	+7.33	3	+2
F	Green Left	1,962	7.82	+2.36	2	+1
Ø	Red-Green Alliance	1,828	7.29	+2.15	2	+1
D	New Right	1,064	4.24	+2.18	1	+1
O	Danish People's Party	1,062	4.23	-6.37	1	-2
B	Social Liberals	806	3.21	+0.28	1	0
Æ	Fælleslisten	719	2.87	New	1	New
Å	The Alternative	240	0.96	-1.89	0	-1
Total		25,087	100	N/A	29	N/A
Invalid votes		106	0.28	+0.16		
Blank votes		396	1.05	+0.31		
Turnout		25,589	68.10	-5.80		
Source: valg.dk
