= 2025 Vordingborg municipal election =

Municipal election in Denmark

← 2021	18 November 2025	2029 →

All 27 seats to the Vordingborg municipal council 14 seats needed for a majority
- Turnout: 26,375 (71.0%) ▲2.9%
	First party	Second party	Third party
	A	V	I
Party	Social Democrats	Venstre	Liberal Alliance
Last election	11 seats, 35.6%	7 seats, 22.7%	Did not stand
Seats won	7	7	4
Seat change	▼4	0	▲4
Popular vote	5,992	5,577	3,375
Percentage	23.1%	21.5%	13.0%
Swing	▼12.4%	▼1.2%	New
	Fourth party	Fifth party	Sixth party
	F	O	Ø
Party	Green Left	Danish People's Party	Red-Green Alliance
Last election	2 seats, 7.8%	1 seat, 4.2%	2 seats, 7.3%
Seats won	3	2	2
Seat change	▲1	▲1	0
Popular vote	3,119	1,927	1,734
Percentage	12.0%	7.4%	6.7%
Swing	▲4.2%	▲3.2%	▼0.6%
	Seventh party	Eighth party	Ninth party
	C	Æ	B
Party	Conservatives	Denmark Democrats	Social Liberals
Last election	3 seats, 11.1%	Did not stand	1 seat, 3.2%
Seats won	1	1	0
Seat change	▼2	▲1	▼1
Popular vote	1,339	1,079	683
Percentage	5.2%	4.2%	2.6%
Swing	▼6.0%	New	▼0.6%
Mayor before election
Mikael Smed
Social Democrats
Mayor after election
Michael Seiding Larsen
Venstre

The 2025 Vordingborg Municipal election was held on November 18, 2025, to elect the 27 members to sit in the regional council for the Vordingborg Municipal council, in the period of 2026 to 2029. Michael Seiding Larsen from Venstre, would win the mayoral position.

== Background ==
Following the 2021 election, Mikael Smed from Social Democrats became mayor for his second term. He would run for a third term. The election in 2021 elected 29 seats, however this was reduced to 27 seats from this election onwards.

=== 2021 Election Results and notional results with 27 Seats Contested ===
Parties	Vote		Seats		
Parties	Votes	%	Actual Seats	Notional Seats	+ / -
Social Democrats	8,921	35.6	11	11	0
Venstre	5,695	22.7	7	6	-1
Conservatives	2,790	11.1	3	3	0
Green Left	1,962	7.8	2	2	0
Red–Green Alliance	1,828	7.3	2	2	0
New Right	1,064	4.2	1	1	0
Danish People's Party	1,062	4.2	1	1	0
Fælleslisten	719	2.9	1	1	0
Social Liberals	806	3.2	1	0	-1
Total	25,087	100.0	29	27	-2

== Electoral system ==
For elections to Danish municipalities, a number varying from 9 to 31 are chosen to be elected to the municipal council. The seats are then allocated using the D'Hondt method and a closed list proportional representation. Vordingborg Municipality had 27 seats in 2025.

== Electoral alliances ==
=== Electoral Alliance 1 ===
Party		Political alignment
A	Social Democrats	Centre-left
B	Social Liberals	Centre to Centre-left
F	Green Left	Centre-left to Left-wing
Ø	Red-Green Alliance	Left-wing to Far-Left

=== Electoral Alliance 2 ===
Party		Political alignment
C	Conservatives	Centre-right
I	Liberal Alliance	Centre-right to Right-wing
M	Moderates	Centre to Centre-right
O	Danish People's Party	Right-wing to Far-right
V	Venstre	Centre-right
Æ	Denmark Democrats	Right-wing to Far-right

== Results by polling station ==
Division	A	B	C	E	F	I	L	M	O	V	Æ	Ø
Division	%	%	%	%	%	%	%	%	%	%	%	%
Vordingborg (Gåsetårnskolen)	25.1	2.8	7.0	0.3	12.8	13.5	1.1	1.3	5.9	21.1	2.8	6.0
Nyråd	27.4	2.3	6.4	0.1	14.1	13.7	0.3	1.3	4.2	23.1	2.6	4.4
Kastrup Hallen	20.5	2.0	8.1	0.4	10.9	16.9	1.6	1.3	9.9	18.6	3.5	6.2
Bårse	13.1	2.5	6.1	0.3	7.5	16.5	1.0	0.7	8.4	29.6	8.9	5.4
Lundby	17.8	11.1	5.7	0.7	9.1	12.1	1.6	1.2	9.8	16.5	9.8	4.6
Ørslev Egnshus	20.1	1.7	6.3	0.6	7.6	15.3	1.4	1.2	12.7	24.9	5.1	3.1
Stege	24.9	1.5	3.5	0.2	11.0	4.6	2.5	6.1	6.3	28.3	2.9	8.2
Østmøn	18.1	2.8	2.9	0.7	14.2	4.0	3.4	3.1	9.3	27.5	4.3	9.8
Vestmøn	16.8	1.7	3.7	0.2	12.3	5.0	3.9	4.1	6.5	23.2	2.9	19.8
Bogø	14.5	0.9	3.3	0.0	33.3	10.1	2.4	0.9	9.0	16.7	3.2	5.7
Præstø	30.0	0.7	2.6	0.1	11.6	25.5	0.8	0.9	5.4	14.2	2.9	5.3
Allerslev	21.1	1.6	4.4	0.0	11.5	17.8	0.4	1.8	8.2	24.8	2.4	6.1
Jungshoved	27.0	1.6	2.0	0.0	16.7	19.1	0.7	0.7	6.3	10.1	6.1	9.7
Mern	22.3	1.7	4.4	0.6	9.3	11.5	1.5	1.5	9.8	24.2	7.8	5.3
Kalvehave	23.6	2.4	5.3	0.6	11.4	9.1	1.6	6.4	10.5	18.0	4.6	6.4
Stensved	24.1	1.6	5.8	0.3	8.2	14.0	1.5	2.1	7.8	23.8	5.2	5.6

== Results ==
Party		Votes	%	+/-	Seats	+/-
Vordingborg Municipality
A	Social Democrats	5,992	23.13	-12.43	7	-4
V	Venstre	5,577	21.53	-1.18	7	0
I	Liberal Alliance	3,375	13.03	New	4	New
F	Green Left	3,119	12.04	+4.22	3	+1
O	Danish People's Party	1,927	7.44	+3.20	2	+1
Ø	Red-Green Alliance	1,734	6.69	-0.59	2	0
C	Conservatives	1,339	5.17	-5.95	1	-2
Æ	Denmark Democrats	1,079	4.16	New	1	New
B	Social Liberals	683	2.64	-0.58	0	-1
M	Moderates	598	2.31	New	0	New
L	Vordingborg Borgerliste	403	1.56	New	0	New
E	Stabilt Demokrati	83	0.32	New	0	New
Total		25,909	100	N/A	27	N/A
Invalid votes		77	0.21	-0.07		
Blank votes		389	1.05	-0.03		
Turnout		26,375	70.97	+2.87		
Source: valg.dk

== Opinion polls ==
Polling firm	Fieldwork date	Sample size	A	V	C	F	Ø	O	B	E	I	L	M	Æ	Others	Lead
Epinion	4 Sep - 13 Oct 2025	539	29.8	13.3	4.5	12.8	6.0	10.5	1.2	–	12.5	–	3.6	5.8	0.1	16.5
2024 european parliament election	9 Jun 2024		19.0	13.7	6.9	17.7	6.6	9.2	4.5	–	5.1	–	7.5	7.4	–	1.3
2022 general election	1 Nov 2022		33.5	9.5	3.7	10.2	4.3	4.3	2.0	–	5.5	–	11.6	7.4	–	21.9
2021 regional election	16 Nov 2021		39.5	20.4	10.7	6.8	7.2	4.9	2.9	–	0.7	–	–	–	–	19.1
2021 municipal election	16 Nov 2021		35.6 (11)	22.7 (7)	11.1 (3)	7.8 (2)	7.3 (2)	4.2 (1)	3.2 (1)	–	–	–	–	–	–	12.9
