= Niels Nielsen (mathematician) =

Danish mathematician (1865–1931)

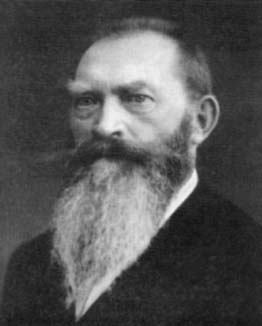
- Born: 2 December 1865; Ørslev, Vordingborg
- Died: 16 September 1931 (aged 65); Copenhagen
- Education: University of Copenhagen
- Scientific career
- Fields: Mathematics
- Workplaces: University of Copenhagen

Niels Nielsen (2 December 1865, in Ørslev – 16 September 1931, in Copenhagen) was a Danish mathematician who specialised in mathematical analysis.

== Life and work ==
Nielsen was the son of humble peasants and grew up in the western part of the island of Funen. In 1891 he graduated in mathematics from the University of Copenhagen and in 1895 obtained his doctorate. In 1909 he succeeded Julius Petersen as Professor of Mathematics at the University of Copenhagen.

His most original works were on special functions, with an important contribution to the theory of the gamma function.

In 1917 he suffered from an illness from which he never fully recovered. From this date onward he became interested in the number theory, Bernoulli numbers, Stirling numbers, and the history of mathematics, writing two books on Danish mathematicians of the time period 1528-1908, and two other books on French mathematicians.

== Selected publications ==
- Om en klasse bestemte integraler og nogle derved definerede semi-periodiske funktioner, J. Møller, 1895 (dänisch; Dissertation)
- Handbuch der Theorie der Cylinderfunktionen, B. G. Teubner, Leipzig 1904 (im Internet-Archiv)
- Handbuch der Theorie der Gammafunktion, B. G. Teubner, Leipzig 1906 (im Internet-Archiv, dito, dito)
- Theorie des Integrallogarithmus und verwandter Transzendenten, B. G. Teubner, Leipzig 1906 (im Internet-Archiv, bei der Cornell University)
- Der Eulersche Dilogarithmus und seine Verallgemeinerungen, E. Karras, 1909; Nova Acta Leopoldina 90, 1909, S. 121–212 (Jahrbuch-Bericht)
- Lehrbuch der unendlichen Reihen. Vorlesungen gehalten an der Universität Kopenhagen, B. G. Teubner, Leipzig 1909 (im Internet-Archiv, bei der Cornell University)
- Matematiken i Danmark. Bidrag til en bibliografisk-historisk oversigt (Mathematik in Dänemark. Beiträge zu einem bibliographisch-historischen Überblick), 2 Bände 1801–1908 und 1528–1800, Gyldendalske Boghandel Nordisk Forlag, København & Kristiania 1910 1912 (dänisch)
- Elemente der Funktionentheorie. Vorlesungen gehalten an der Universität Kopenhagen, B. G. Teubner, Leipzig 1911 (bei der Cornell University)
- Traité élémentaire des nombres de Bernoulli, Gauthier-Villars, Paris 1923 (französisch; bei Gallica)
- Franske matematikere under revolutionen, Bianco Lunos Bogtrykkeri, 1927 (dänisch; mit 76 Mathematiker-Biographien); Géomètres français sous la révolution, Levin & Munksgaard, 1929 (französische Übersetzung; Jahrbuch-Bericht)
