= Vordingborg Municipality =

Vordingborg Municipality Vordingborg Kommune (Danish)
- Municipality
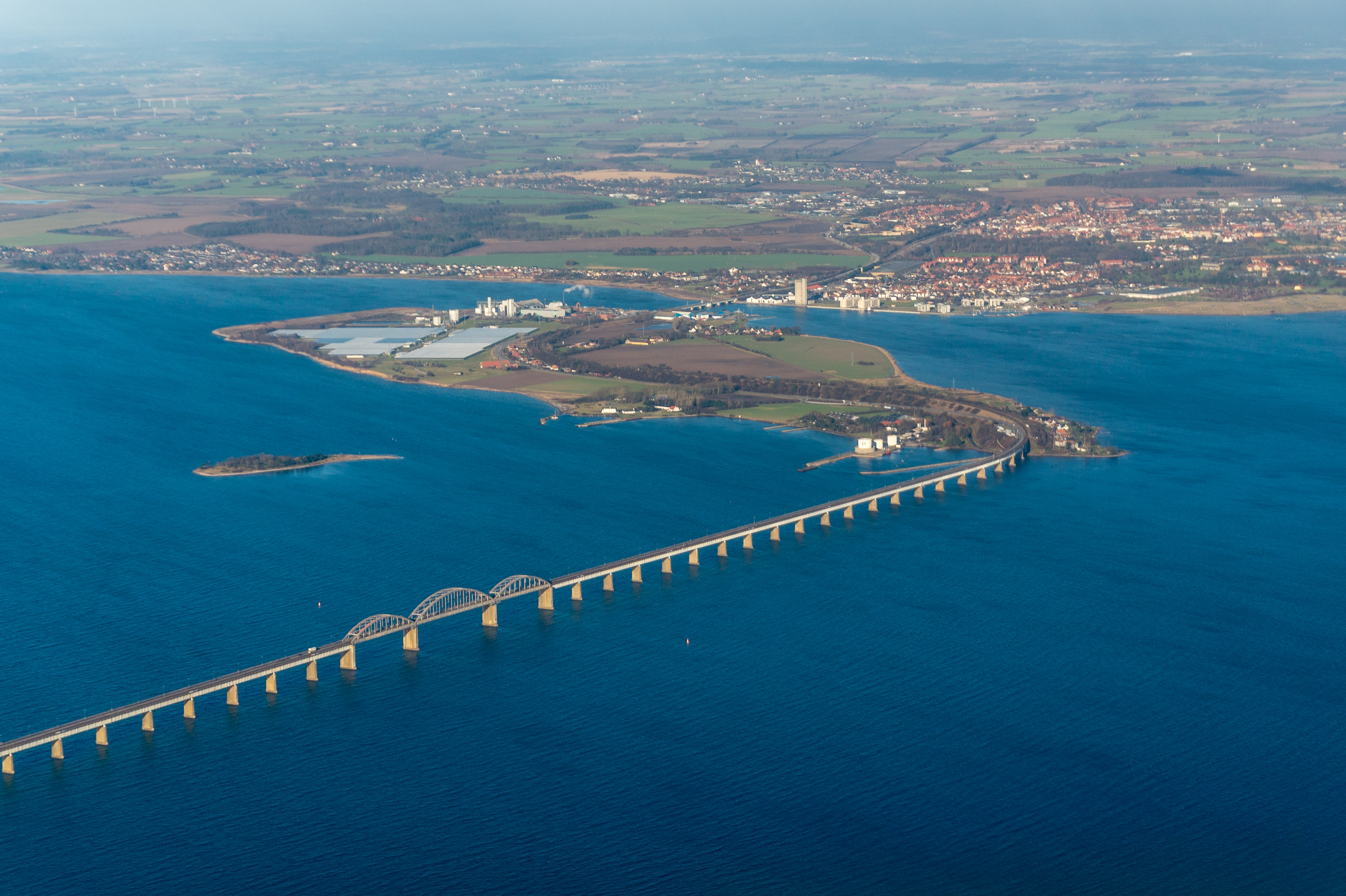

- Coat of arms

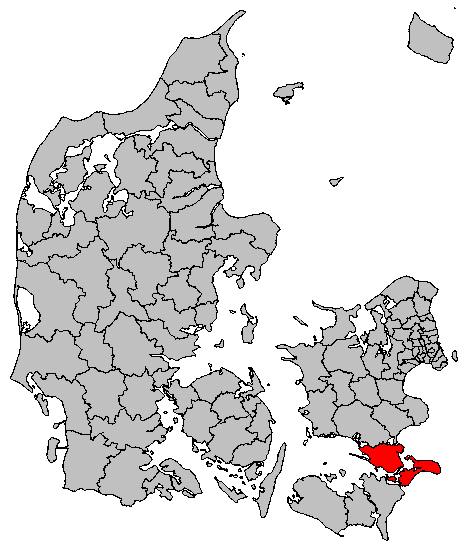
- Coordinates: 55°00′30″N 11°54′37″E
- Country: Denmark
- Region: Zealand
- Established: 1 January 2007
- Seat: Vordingborg

Government
  - Mayor: Mikael Smed (A)

Area
  - Total: 621.0 km^{2} (239.8 sq mi)

Population (1 January 2026)
  - Total: 44,831
  - Density: 72.19/km^{2} (187.0/sq mi)
- Time zone: UTC+1 (CET)
  - Summer (DST): UTC+2 (CEST)
- Postal code: 4760
- Municipal code: 390
- Website: www.vordingborg.dk

Vordingborg Municipality (Danish: Vordingborg Kommune, Danish pronunciation: [ˌvɒːte̝ŋˈpɒˀ]) is a kommune in the Sjælland Region, which is on the southeast coast of the island of Zealand in south Denmark. It was established in 2007. The municipality covers an area of 621 km^{2}. It has a total population of 44,831 (2026). Its fourth and current mayor is Mikael Smed of the Social Democrats, who was elected in 2017, replacing Michael Seiding Larsen of the agrarian-liberal Venstre party.

The municipality takes its name from the town of the same name.

== Overview ==
The Masnedsund Bridge connects the town of Vordingborg to the island of Masnedø. The Storstrøm Bridge connects Masnedø to the neighboring municipality of Guldborgsund on Falster near the town of Orehoved. The bridge is 3,199 meters long and supports two lanes of traffic and a single-track railway. It was inaugurated in 1937.

The Farø Bridges (The Farø High Bridge and the Farø Low Bridge) opened in 1985 and connect the two municipalities from the town of Bakkebølle Strand over Farø island (part of former Møn municipality) to Falster near the town of Sortsøgab. Bogø island is also part of the municipality.

As part of wider municipal reforms, an earlier Vordingborg municipality was merged with its neighboring municipalities of Langebæk, Møn, and Præstø on 1 January 2007, forming the enlarged Vordingborg Municipality.

Around 135 km (84 mi) east of Vordingborg municipality across the Baltic Sea is Bornholm, the easternmost municipality of Denmark, which is a part of the Capital Region of Denmark.

For the location of Vordingborg municipality relative to its neighbors, see the location diagram at the bottom of the corresponding article on Danish language Wikipedia, Vordingborg Kommune.

== Urban areas ==
The nine largest communities in the municipality are:

Vordingborg	11,600
Præstø	3,800
Stege	3,800

Nyråd	2,500
Ørslev	1,900
Stensved	1,600

Køng	980
Mern	960
Bogø By	870

== Politics ==
=== Municipal council ===
Vordingborg's municipal council consists of 29 members, elected every four years.

Below are the municipal councils elected since the Municipal Reform of 2007.

Election	Party								Total seats	Turnout	Elected mayor
Election	A	B	C	F	O	V	Ø	Å	Total seats	Turnout	Elected mayor
2005	11	2	1	2	2	10	1		29	72.1%	Henrik Holmer (A)
2009	8	1	3	6	3	8			29	69.1%	Henrik Holmer (A)
2013	8	1	1	2	4	11	2		29	75.8%	Knud Larsen (V)
2013	8	1	1	2	4	11	2		29	75.8%	Michael Seiding Larsen (V)
2017	13	1	1	1	3	8	1	1	29	73.9%	Mikael Smed (A)
Data from Kmdvalg.dk 2005, 2009, 2013 and 2017

== Notable people ==
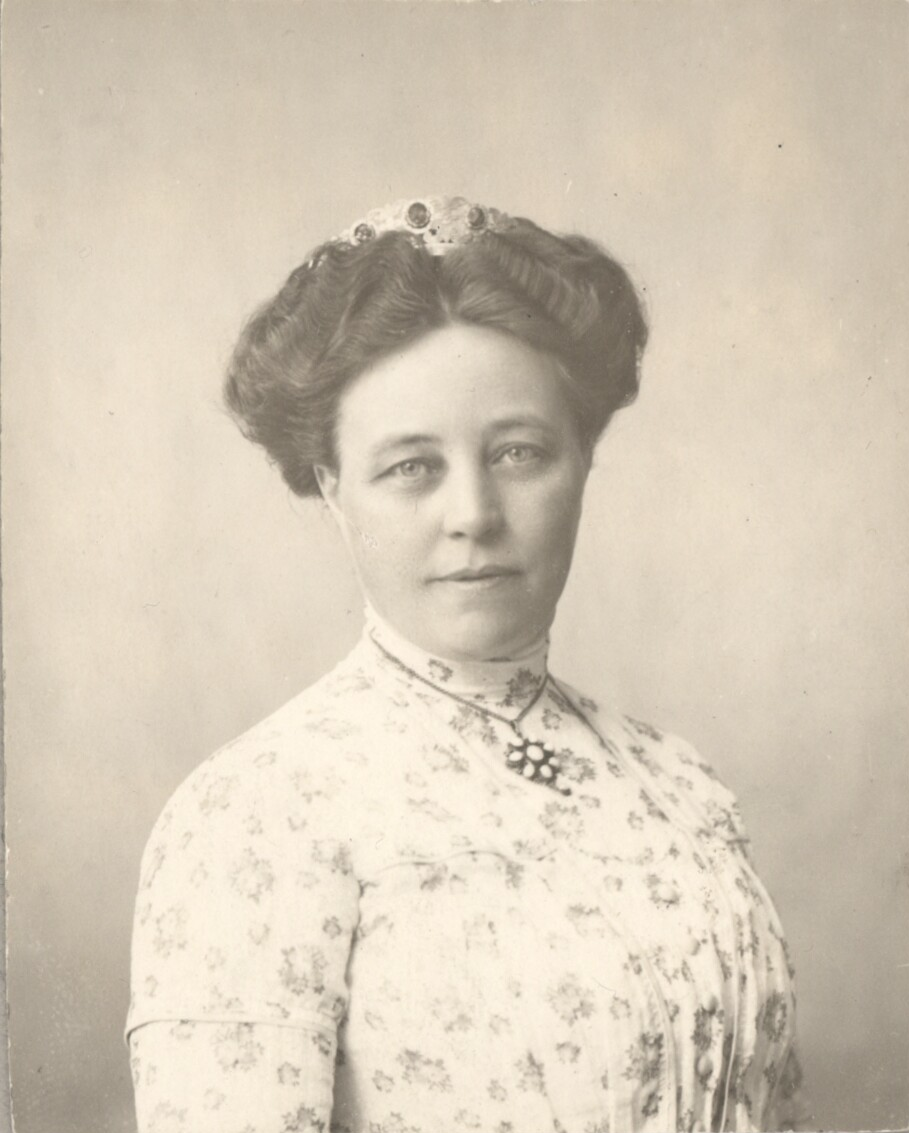
Elna Munch

- Johan Friis (1494 at Lundbygård – 1570) a Danish statesman, Chancellor under King Christian III of Denmark
- Nikolaj Frederik Severin Grundtvig (1783 in Udby – 1872), usually N. F. S. Grundtvig, was a Danish pastor, author, poet, philosopher, historian, teacher and politician.
- Clara Tybjerg (1864 in Kalvehave – 1941) a women's rights activist, pacifist and educator
- Niels Nielsen (1865 in Ørslev – 1931) a mathematician, specialized in mathematical analysis
- Elna Munch (1871 in Kalvehave – 1945) a Danish feminist and politician,
- Nina Hole (1941 – 2016 in Ørslev) a Danish artist, sculptor, and performance artist
- Henrik Koefoed (born 1955 in Kalvehave) a Danish actor
- Cecilie Thomsen (born 1974 on Bogø), actress and model

== See also ==
- List of churches in Vordingborg Municipality
