= Visions of Europe (film) =

2004 anthology film by 25 European directors

Visions of Europe is a 2004 internationally co-produced anthology film consisting of 25 short films by as many directors, each from a country representing then member states of the European Union. The directors include Aki Kaurismäki, Fatih Akin, Béla Tarr, and Peter Greenaway.

== Content ==
All the subjects express their creator's vision of what is Europe or the European Union. The Portuguese director Teresa Villaverde shows migrants arriving on the coast of Italy, in "Cold Water" while the Finnish Aki Kaurismaki films the Portuguese town of Bico. For Lithuania, Šarūnas Bartas directed "Children Lose Nothing", a wordless romance involving two teenagers.

Each short film has an approximate duration of 5 minutes.

Title	Director	Writer	Cast	Country
The Yellow Tag	Jan Troell		Agneta Ulfsäter Troellalan-Rees; Johanna Troell	Sweden
Europe	Christoffer Boe		Henning Moritzen; Cecilie Thomsen; Marie Hilderbrandt Frederiksen; Piera Dencker-Rasmussen	Denmark
I'll Be Fine	Laila Pakalniņa		—N/a	Latvia
Die Bõsen Alten Leder	Fatih Akin		İdil Üner	Germany
Cold Waiter	Teresa Villaverde		—N/a	Portugal
The Miracle	Martin Šulík	Martin Šulík; Marek Lescak	Karol Spisák; Barbara Horváthová; Margarita Huttová; Vít Bednárik	Slovakia
Anna Vive a Marghera, Italia (Anna Lives in Marghera, Italy)	Francesca Comencini		—N/a	Italy
Children Loose Nothing	Šarūnas Bartas		Ina Marija Bartaitė; Julija Steponaityte; Rimas Petravieius; Aleksas Jermolenko; Adele Markauskiene; Henrikas Rachkus	Lithuania
Room for All	Constantine Giannaris		Giorgos Striftaris; Theodoros Kemis; Athina Sarla	Greece
Prologue	Béla Tarr		—N/a	Hungary
Invisible State	Aisling Walsh	Gerard Mannix Flynn		Ireland
Crossroad	Małgorzata Szumowska		Adam Walicki; Monika Winiarczyk; Konrad Bugaj; Marek Zawierucha; Wojciech Szumowski; Jacek Drosio	Poland
Paris by Night	Tony Gatlif		Leila Makhlouf; Abdel Mekraza; Mohamadou Diao; Agathe L'Huillier; Marion Lecrivain; Rona Hartner	France
Euro Quiz	Theo van Gogh	Hans Teeuwen	Tara Elders; Olga Zuiderhoek	Holland
My House on Tape	Christos Georgiou	Christos Georgiou; Giorgos Koumouros	Antonis Katsaris; Dimitris Ksystras; Androulla Irakleous; Andros Pafios	Cyprus
The European Showerbath	Peter Greenaway		—N/a	United Kingdom
Euroflot	Arvo Iho	Arvo Iho; Priit Pärn	Kadri Oim; Elinor Kimmel; Ilmar Raag; Janis Nords; Sergei Jõgis; Shane Hancock; Anna Jatskina	Estonia
Mars	Barbara Albert		Kathrin Resetarits; Angus Okanume; Markus Hering; Rupert L. Lehofer	Austria
The Isle	Kenneth Scicluna		Ben Stuart; Marieclaire Camilleri; Eileen Micallef; Philip Mizzi	Malta
Title	Stijn Coninx		Pieter Embrechts; Sofie Van Moll; Safia Aggoune; Benzirar Baroudi	Belgium
The Language School	Andy Bausch		Hervé Sogne; Franck Sasonoff; Runa Egilsdóttir	Luxembourg
Evropa	Damjan Kozole		Peter Musevski; Franci Kek; Ivica Vidovic	Slovenia
Unisono	Saša Gedeon		—N/a	Czech Republic
Bico	Aki Kaurismäki		Brazelina Rodriques; Virginia Rodriques; Palmira Fernandes; Mariana Lopes-Alves; Abel Alves	Finland
Our Kids	Miguel Hermoso		—N/a	Spain

== Reception ==
Variety commented that "Offering one of his most accessible films in years, U.K. helmer Peter Greenaway lays on a witty parable in which naked people, each body-painted with a national flag, climb into a warm shower together in the same order in which each country joined the EU."
