= Ina Marija Bartaitė =

Lithuanian actress (1996–2021)

- Born: 2 May 1996; Vilnius, Lithuania
- Died: 7 April 2021 (aged 24); Vilnius, Lithuania
- Burial place: Artists' Hill, Antakalnis Cemetery, Vilnius, Lithuania
- Occupation: Actress
- Relatives: Šarūnas Bartas, father Yekaterina Golubeva, mother

Ina Marija Bartaitė (2 May 1996 – 7 April 2021) was a Lithuanian film actress. She is known for her roles in Peace to Us in Our Dreams and Seneca's Day, among others.

== Career ==
Since a young age Bartaitė followed her father's, Šarūnas Bartas, footsteps, acting in many films and accompanying her father to many award ceremonies.

The first film Bartaitė ever appeared in was Visions of Europe, an anthology film with a collection of short film projects by different directors, such as Aki Kaurismäki, Fatih Akin, Béla Tarr, and Peter Greenaway. Her father directed and wrote the segment Children Lose Nothing, a wordless romance involving two teenagers, in which Bartaitė acted.

In 2016, at the Vilnius International Film Festival (Kino Pavasaris), Bartaitė garnered critical acclaim and earned her nomination for Best Lithuanian Actress for the role in Peace to Us in Our Dreams.

Before 2020, Bartaitė played a role in Bojena Horackova film Walden. It is a story about young girl Jana, played by Bartaitė, who after twenty-five years of exile in Paris returns to Vilnius, wanting to find the lake that Paulius, her first lover, called "Walden".

The last film Bartaitė worked on is Our Men (Mon Légionnaire) directed and co-written by Rachel Lang, with a cast that includes Louis Garrel, Camille Cottin, and Alexander Kuznetsov. It was released in 2021. She created a character called Nika, a woman in her early twenties, who leaves Ukraine to follow her boyfriend Vlad, a young soldier based in a military camp in Corsica.

== Personal life ==
Having finished her high school education in Vilnius, Bartaitė proceeded to attend Vilnius University, where she pursued a degree in French Philology. She then went on to study acting at Cours Florent in Paris.

At the time of her death, Bartaitė lived in Valakampiai with her grandmother, who had taken care of her since birth and was in ill health.

In an interview, Bartaitė mentioned her proficiency in French and her frequent visits to Paris, where a few family members and a sister of hers, Nastya Golubeva Carax, resided and with whom she conversed in French. She further revealed in the same interview, that the idea of becoming an actress didn't cross her mind until her father proposed that she join one of his films, a notion she decided to embrace.

She was the only daughter of a film director, Šarūnas Bartas, and an actress, Yekaterina Golubeva.

== Death ==
Bartaitė died at the scene of a traffic collision on 7 April 2021, aged 24. She was cycling home during a rainy evening, when an intoxicated driver, who was speeding twice over the limit at 123 km/h (76 mph), hit Bartaitė's bike from the back and instantly killed her.

It was eventually revealed that the driver, Mindaugas Daukšys, is the son of a Lithuanian politician and former member of Seimas Kęstutis Daukšys. He was sentenced to 3 years 4 months in jail, with the 3 years suspended and settled privately for civil damages.

The sudden death of Bartaitė has sent a shock wave through the family and the people Bartaitė has worked through the years.

A friend of Bartaitė, Denisas Kolomickis, stated, "Ina was a unique in her field of work, unique she was as a person: phenomenally talented, sensitive, philosophical". Bartaitė's co-star of the film Mon Légionnaire, Aleksandr Kuznestov, posted a tribute on social media after her death, pleading: "you hugged me with a very long hug, then looked in my drunken eyes and said: "I think I love you as a person". These were your last words to me".

TV producer Andrius Tapinas expressed extreme anger over the lack of remorse from the culprit.

== Filmography ==
- Visions of Europe (2004)
- Peace to Us in Our Dreams (2015)
- I Am Katya Golubeva (2016)
- Seneca's Day (2016)
- Walden (2020)
- Our Men (2021)
