= Our Men (film) =

- Theatrical release poster
- French: Mon légionnaire
- Directed by: Rachel Lang
- Written by: Rachel Lang
- Produced by: Jérémy Forni; Benoit Roland
- Starring: Louis Garrel; Camille Cottin; Ina Marija Bartaité; Aleksandr Kuznetsov
- Cinematography: Fiona Braillon
- Edited by: Sophie Vercruysse
- Production companies: Chevaldeuxtrois; Wrong Men; Canal+; Cine+; RTBF; VOO; BeTV; Proximus; Mubi; CNC
- Distributed by: BAC Films
- Release dates: 15 July 2021 (Cannes); 6 October 2021 (France)
- Running time: 106 minutes
- Countries: France; Belgium
- Languages: English; French; Russian

Our Men (French: Mon légionnaire) is a 2021 French-Belgian drama film, written and directed by Rachel Lang. It stars Louis Garrel, Camille Cottin, Ina Marija Bartaité and Aleksandr Kuznetsov.

It had its world premiere at the Cannes Film Festival in the Directors Fortnight section on 15 July 2021. It released in France on 6 October 2021, by BAC Films.

== Cast ==
- Louis Garrel as Maxime
- Camille Cottin as Céline
- Ina Marija Bartaité as Nika
- Aleksandr Kuznetsov as Vlad
- Jean Le Peltier as Romain
- Naidra Ayadi as Soumeya
- Leo Levy as Paul
- Jean Michelangeli as Thomas
- Vladimir Ignat as Akos
- Wilfried Ranaivo as Burak
- Lukas De Wolf as Benni
- Edwin Gaffney as Johnson
- Paul De Bronde as Bastien

== Production ==
In January 2018, it was announced Rachel Lang would direct the film, from a screenplay she wrote. In November 2019, it was announced Louis Garrel, Camille Cottin, Ina Marija Bartaité and Aleksandr Kuznetsov had joined the cast of the film, with BAC Films set to distribute.

== Release ==
It had its world premiere at the Cannes Film Festival in the Directors Fortnight section on 15 July 2021. It released in France on 6 October 2021.

== Critical reception ==
Peter Bradshaw of The Guardian gave the film a four out of five stars writing: "Rachel Lang delivers an unadorned tour de force."
