= Frederik Christian Kielsen =

Danish schoolmaster, editor, translator, and publisher

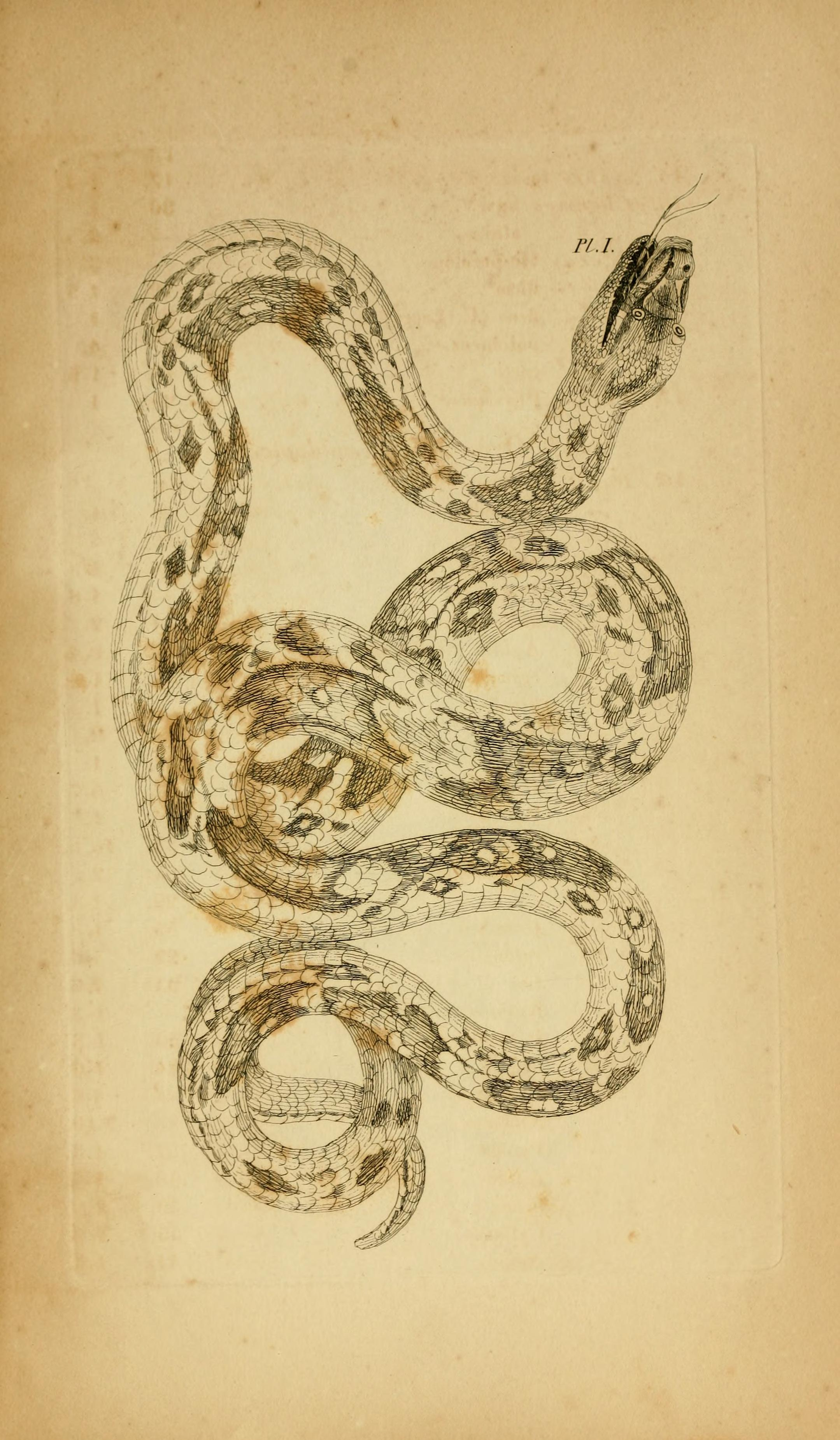
Plate from "Icones amphibiorum" 1835 Boa constrictor

Frederik Christian Kielsen (7 February 1774 in Copenhagen – 18 January 1850 in Frederiksberg) was a Danish schoolmaster noted for editing and publishing a series of copiously illustrated books on natural history – Icones amphibiorum, Icones avium, Icones piscium, Icones vermium, Icones mammalium, and Icones insectorum.

Frederik Christian was the son of Olufsen Kielsen, an organist at the Garrison Church in Copenhagen, and Valentine Margerithe Dresler. He was at a school in Elsinore until 1790 when he began studying surgery, then changed his focus to natural history. He started teaching at the Metropolitan School in 1806. In 1819 he settled in Vordingborg, where he lectured at the Latin School. In 1833 he moved back to Copenhagen, where he lived until his death.

Kielsen married Louise Charlotte Amalie Jacobsen in 1808.

During his career Kielsen translated several German children's books dealing with nature, and wrote his own natural history textbooks. This science was still new in school curricula and its teaching was problematic. His translation of the German Natural History of 1797 by Karl Philipp Funke was widely used in schools. He wrote a comprehensive textbook on systematics and the Guide for Beginners (1807), which remained in use by schools for an entire generation.
