= Seneca's Day =

2016 film

- Film poster
- Directed by: Kristijonas Vildžiūnas
- Written by: Kristijonas Vildziunas
- Starring: Ina Marija Bartaité
- Release date: 26 August 2016 (Estonia)
- Running time: 106 minutes
- Countries: Lithuania; Russia; Estonia
- Languages: Lithuanian; Russian; Estonian
- Box office: $21,077

Seneca's Day (Lithuanian: Senekos diena) is a 2016 Lithuanian drama film directed by Kristijonas Vildžiūnas. It was selected as the Lithuanian entry for the Best Foreign Language Film at the 89th Academy Awards but it was not nominated.

== Cast ==
- Ina Marija Bartaitė
- Dainius Gavenonis
- Elžbieta Latėnaitė
- Mait Malmsten
- Marijus Mažūnas

== See also ==
- List of submissions to the 89th Academy Awards for Best Foreign Language Film
- List of Lithuanian submissions for the Academy Award for Best Foreign Language Film
