= Køng =

- Town
- Location within Denmark Location within Denmark Region Zealand
- Coordinates: 55°6′38″N 11°49′30″E
- Country: Denmark
- Region: Region Zealand
- Municipality: Vordingborg Municipality

Population (2026)
  - Total: 915
- Time zone: UTC+1 (CET)
  - Summer (DST): UTC+2 (CEST)
- Postal codes: 4750

Køng is a small town in Vordingborg Municipality, in Region Zealand, Denmark.
