= Cecilie Thomsen =

Danish actress and model (born 1974)

- Born: 29 October 1974 (age 51); Bogø, Denmark
- Occupations: Actress; model

Cecilie Thomsen (born 29 October 1974) is a Danish actress and model.

Internationally she is best known for her role as the professor Inga Bergstrom in the James Bond movie Tomorrow Never Dies, in which she tries to teach Bond (Pierce Brosnan) Danish.

Furthermore, she is known for her 12-year-long relationship with the Canadian rock singer Bryan Adams, who she met in 1990. The relationship ended in 2002. Between the years 2004 and 2006, she was dating Tim Christensen.

Thomsen graduated as an actor from The Actors Studio Drama School at The New School University in New York and holds a master's degree MFA in drama. In addition, she has studied dance and Alvin Ailey.

In 2009 she made her debut as a music supervisor and executive producer on the soundtrack Songs for A Soundtrack. The album included diverse Danish artists such as C.V. Jørgensen, Sune Rose Wagner, Steen Jørgensen, Ane Trolle, Tim Christensen and Fallulah. The album was positively received with good reviews and five stars in Soundvenue.

== Early life and education ==
Thomsen was born on the island Bogø in Denmark.

== Career ==
Internationally, Cecilie Thomsen is best known for playing the minor Bond girl role of Professor Inga Bergstrøm opposite Pierce Brosnan in the 1997 James Bond feature film Tomorrow Never Dies.

She played in duo with Henning Moritzen in the Danish segment of short film collection Visions of Europe. The segment is called "Europe doesn't exist" and it was directed by Christoffer Boe.

She appeared in the Bryan Adams 1995 music video, "Have You Ever Really Loved a Woman?" directed by Anton Corbijn.

Thomsen performs the spoken words on the Catherine Wheel song 'Delicious' from 1997's Adam and Eve. The band were mixing the album in Vancouver when they met Thomsen through her then partner Bryan Adams.

== Filmography ==
- Tomorrow Never Dies (1997) – Professor Inga Bergstrom
- 54 (1998) – VIP Patron
- House of Fools (2002) – Lithuanian Sharpshooter
- Visions of Europe (2004) – (segment "Denmark: Europe")
- Simon & Malou (2009) – Maria (uncredited)
