= Vordingborg =

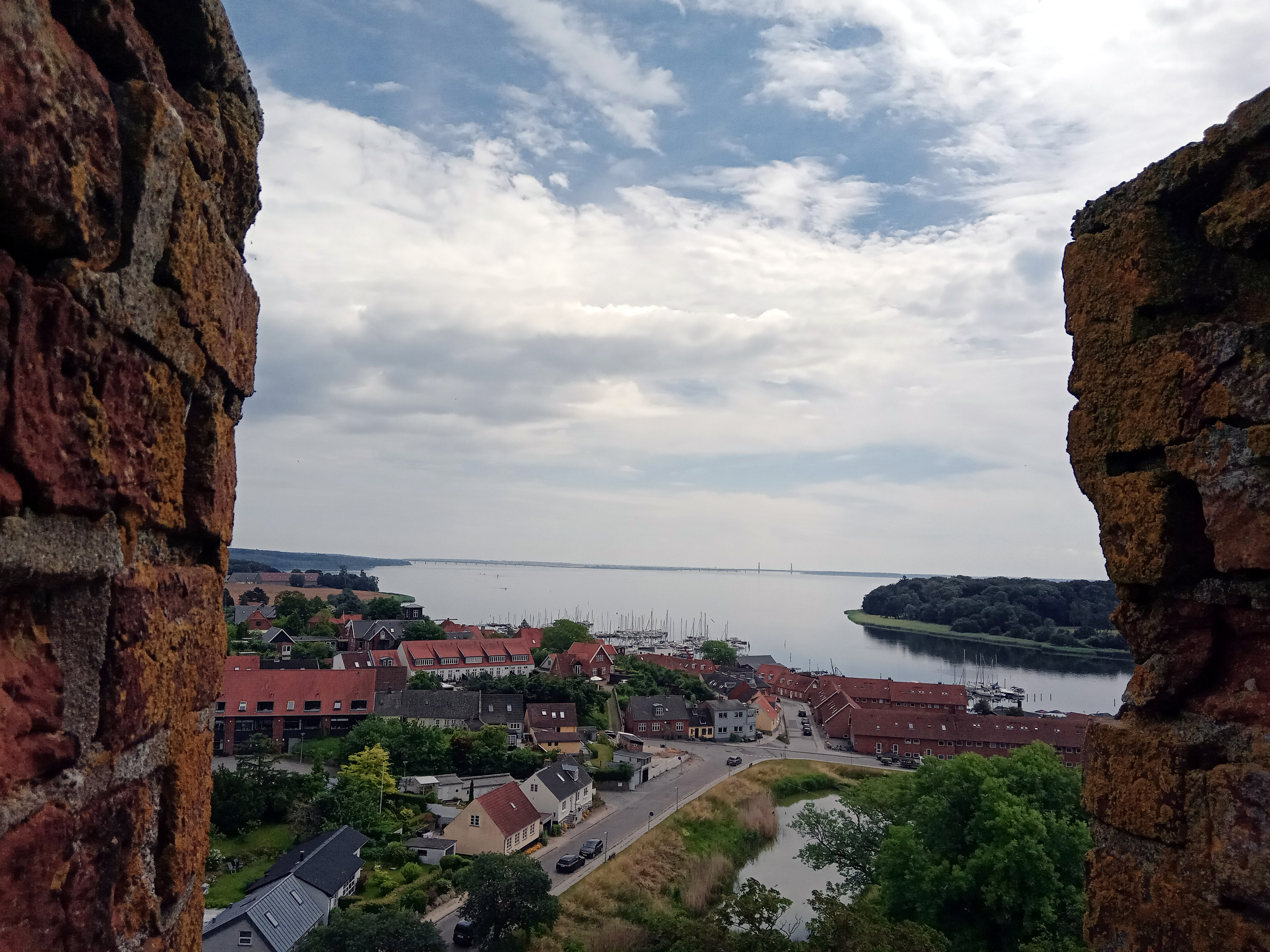
- View of the city from the Goose Tower.

- Coat of arms

- Location in Denmark
- Coordinates: 55.008°N 11.911°E
- Country: Denmark
- Region: Zealand (Sjælland)
- Municipality: Vordingborg

Government
  - Mayor: Henrik Holmer

Population (2026)
  - Total: 17,940
  - Urban area: 11,850
  - Municipality: 44,831
- Time zone: UTC+1 (Central Europe Time)
  - Summer (DST): UTC+2
- Postal code: 4760
- Website: www.vordingborg.dk

Vordingborg (Danish pronunciation: [ˌvɒːte̝ŋˈpɒˀ]) is a market town and old ferry town on the south coast of the island of Zealand in Denmark. Because of three large estates surrounding the town, a coherent urban development has not been possible, which is the reason why three satellite towns (former villages) have emerged around the town. Within the ring of estates, the town has a population of 11,850 (1 January 2026), and a population of 17,940 when including the three satellite towns of Ørslev, Nyråd, and Stensved, situated 1, 3 and 5 kilometres, respectively, from the town of Vordingborg. Vordingborg is located in Vordingborg Municipality in Region Zealand. Vordingborg Municipality (Kommune) has a population of 44,831.

Vordingborg is situated on the southern coast of the island of Zealand. It lies adjacent to the Storstrømmen, a strait separating the island of Zealand from the island of Falster.

== History ==
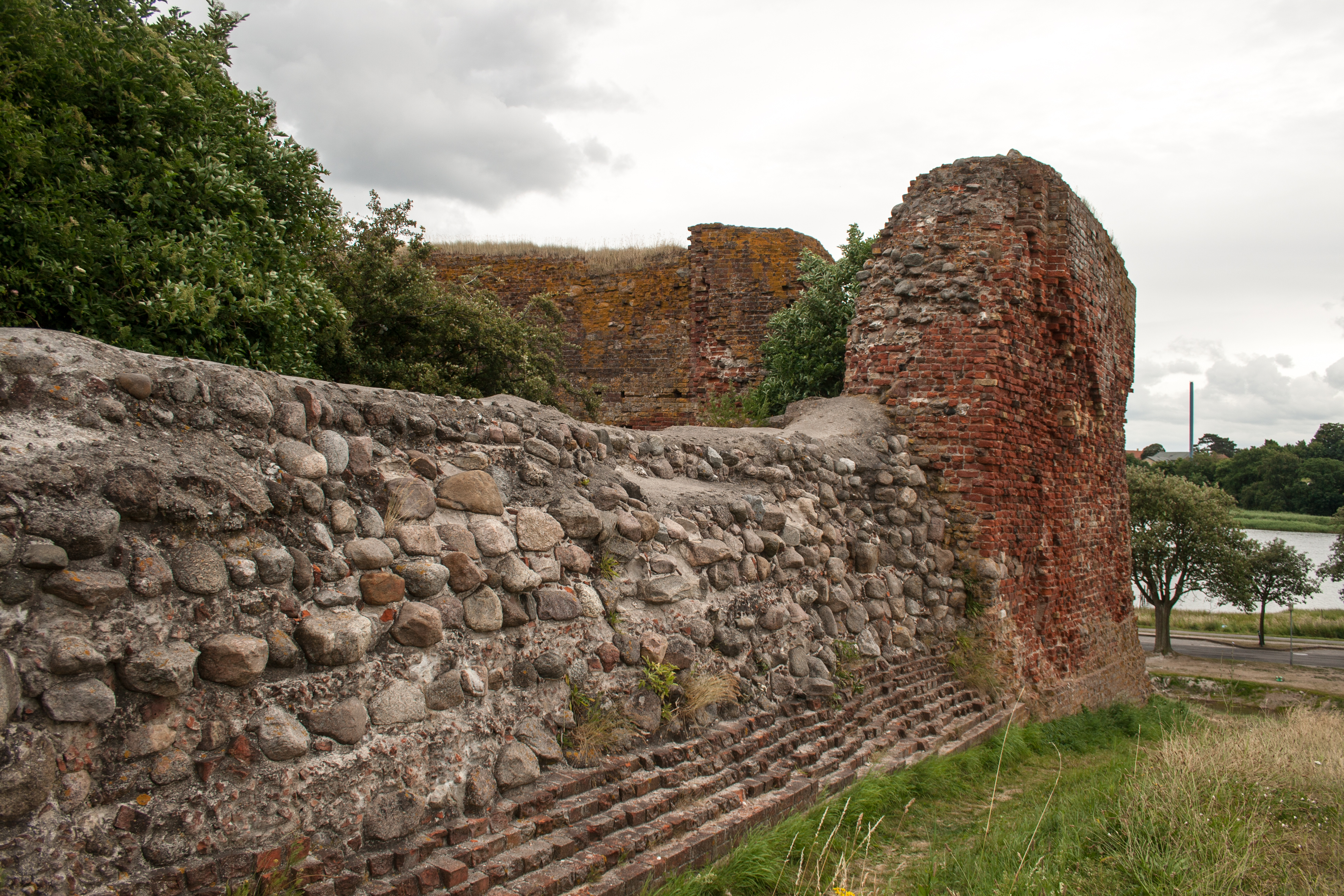
Ruins of Vordingborg Castle.

It is uncertain when the oldest castle was built on the castle hill in Vordingborg, but King Valdemar the Great built a castle on the site in 1157. From Valdemar the Great's founding of the castle until King Valdemar Atterdag's death in 1375, the kings often stayed at the castle and Vordingborg was at the center of Denmark's foreign policy. King Valdemar the Great died at his castle in Worthing in 1182.

The town of Vordingborg itself probably emerged at the beginning of the 12th century, but only gained significant importance with the construction of the castle. In 1415, during the reign of Eric of Pomerania, Vordingborg was given the status of a market town.

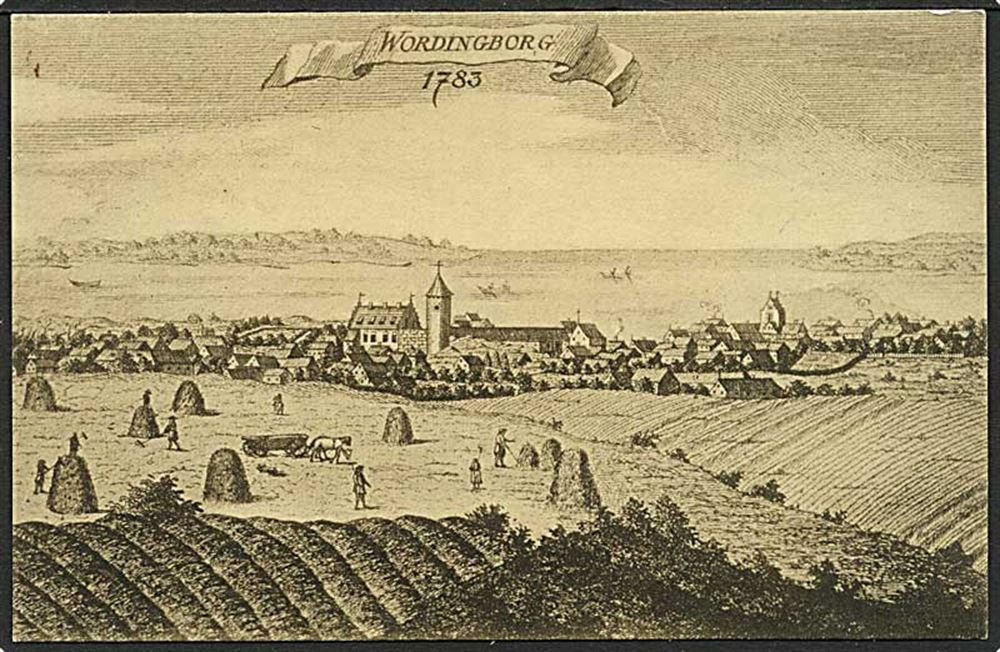
Prospect of Vordingborg in 1783.

== Geography ==
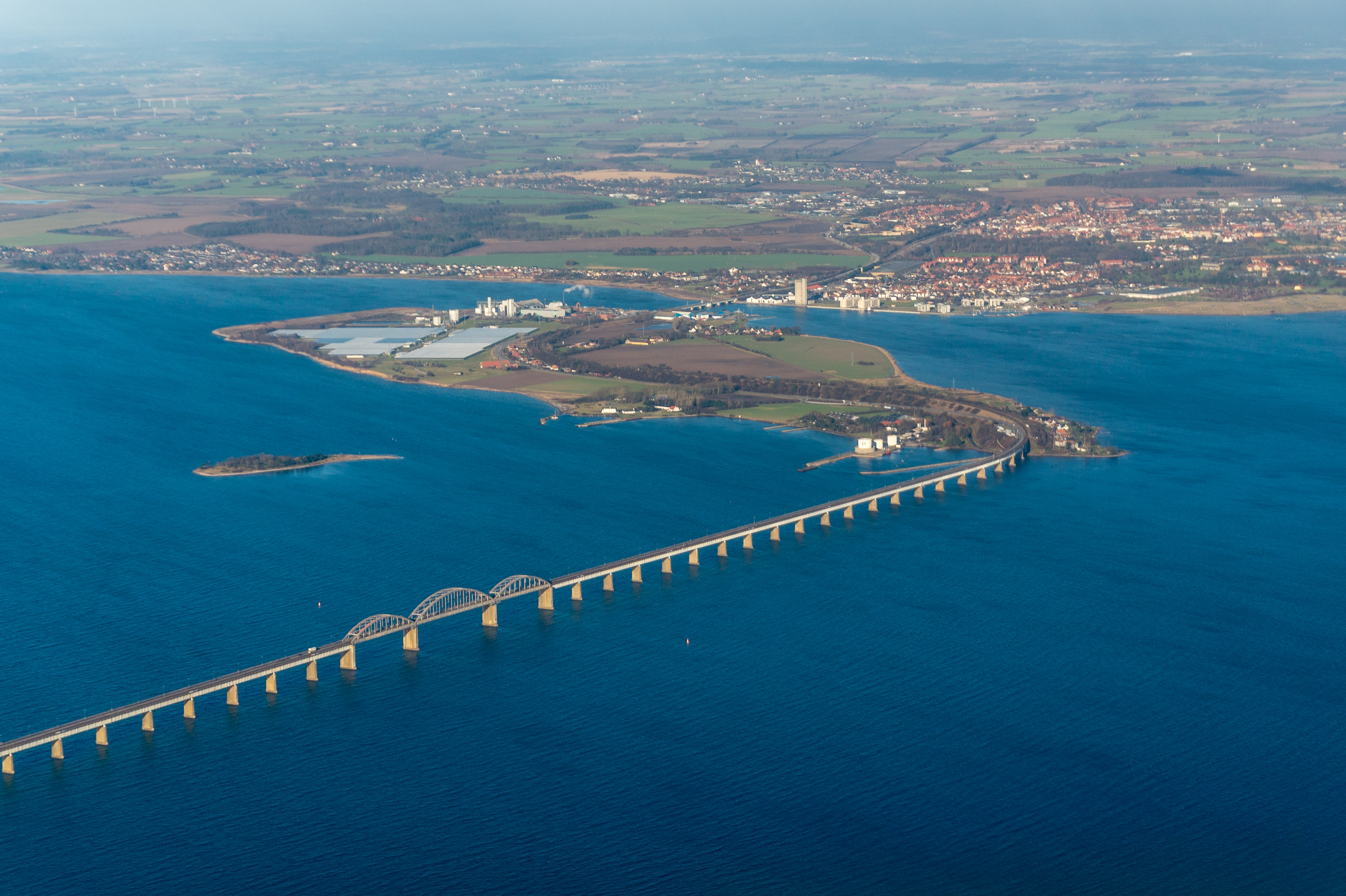
Aerial photograph of the Storstrømmen strait, the Storstrøm Bridge, Masnedø and Vordingborg in the background.

Vordingborg is situated 37 km from Nykøbing Falster, roughly 50 km from Gedser, and roughly 100 km from Copenhagen and Odense. The town is situated on the island of Zealand and is linked to the island of Falster with Farø Bridges and Storstrøm Bridge.

== Economy ==
Vordingborg Municipality is home to 9,500 jobs. Companies headquartered in Vordingborg include Vordingborg Køkkener, a kitchen manufacturer. Udbetaling Danmark, a public institution under ARP, has one of its five regional centres in the town.

== Government ==
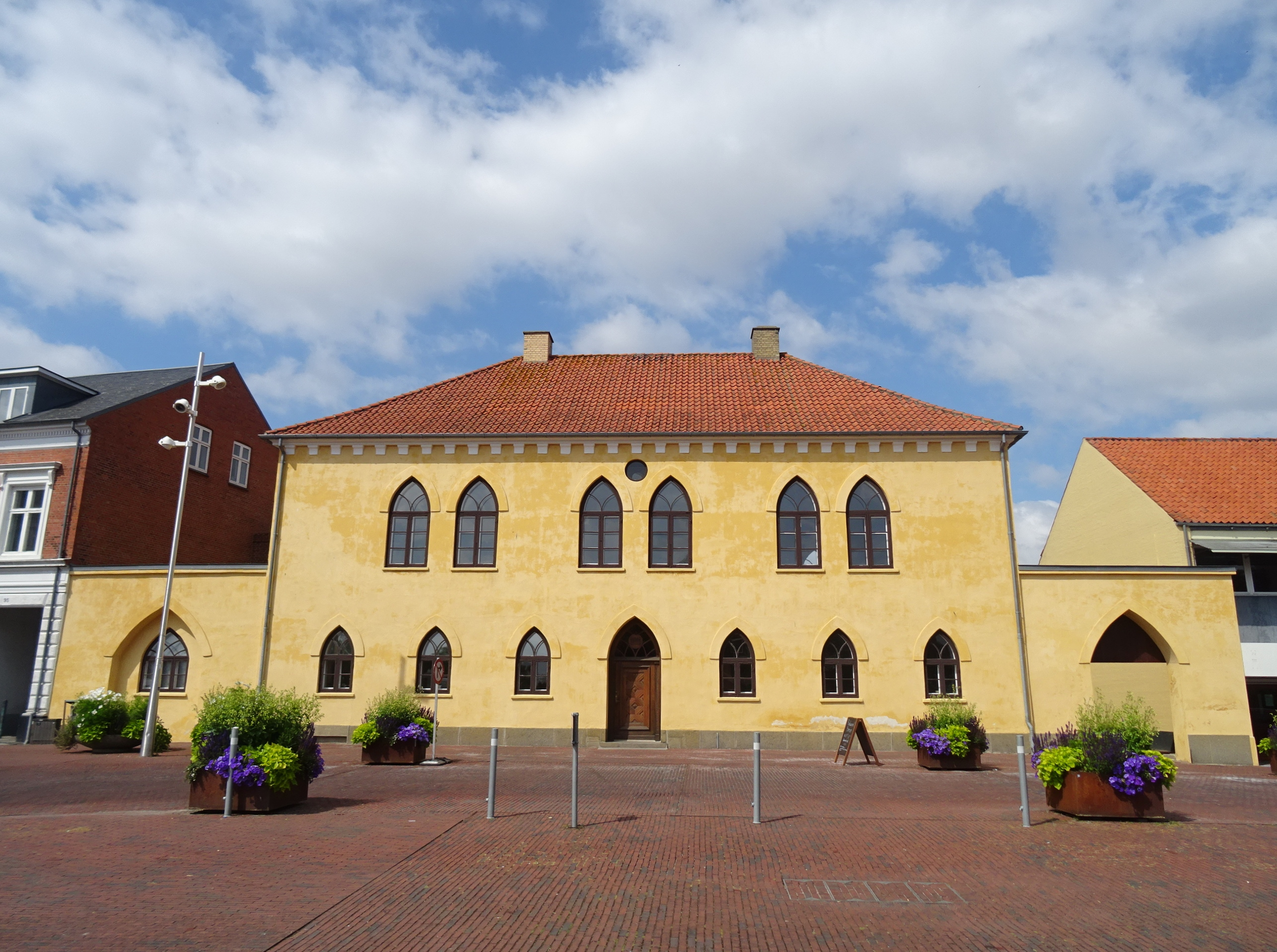
The former town hall at Algade in Vordingborg.

On 1 January 2007, the old Vordingborg municipality was, as the result of Kommunalreformen ("The Municipal Reform" of 2007), merged with Langebæk, Møn, and Præstø municipalities to form an enlarged Vordingborg municipality.

== Transportation and Infrastructure ==
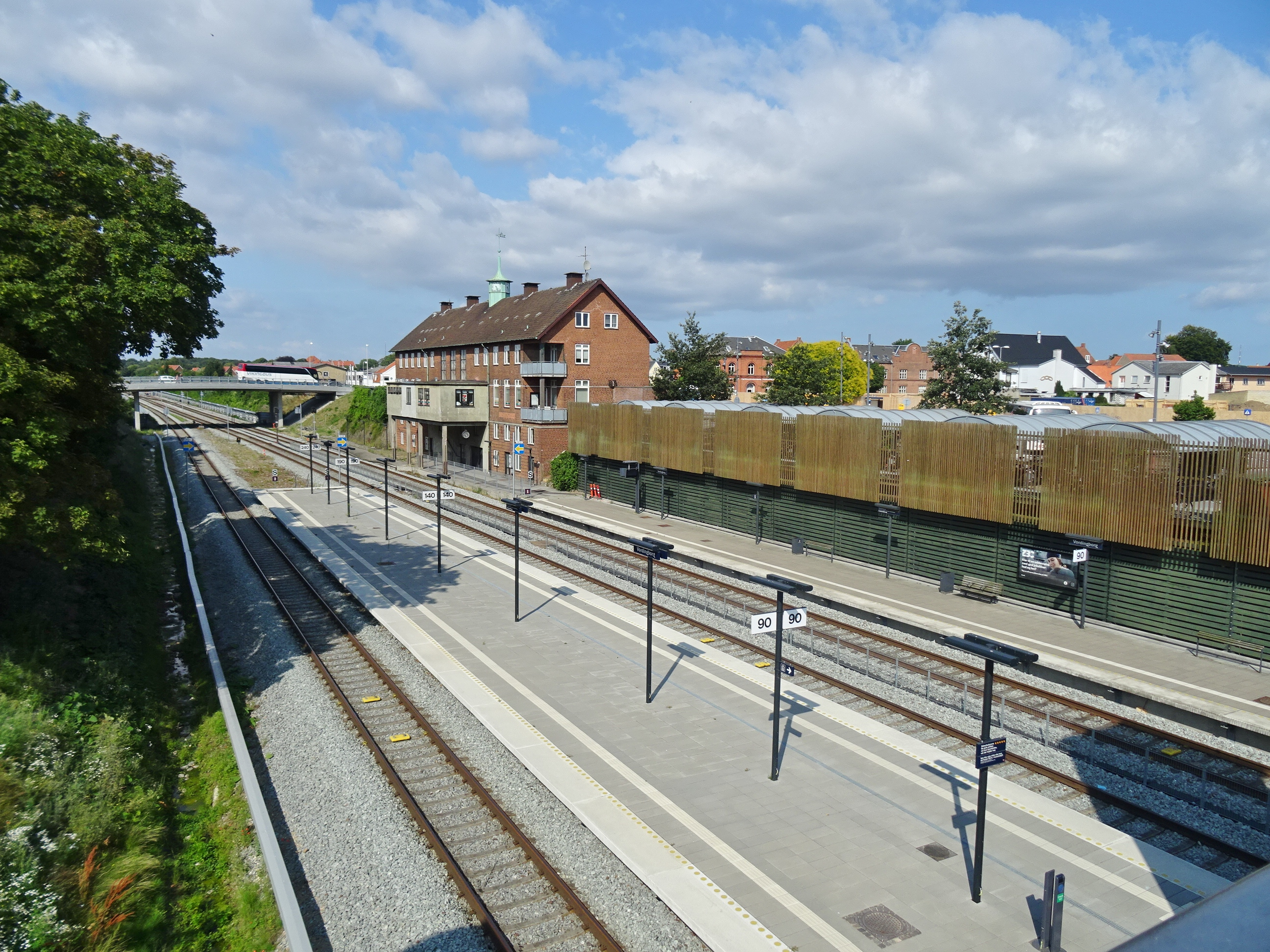
Vordingborg railway station in 2021.

Vordingborg is served by Vordingborg railway station which is located on the South Line which connects Copenhagen with the islands of Falster and Lolland. It offers direct regional rail services to Copenhagen and Nykøbing Falster. From the station there is also bus connection to the towns of Stege, Præstø, Næstved and Maribo, as well as city bus lines.

Vordingborg is located on European route E47 connecting Lübeck in Germany to Helsingborg in Sweden via Copenhagen. Danish national road 22 connects Vordingborg with Kalundborg by way of Næstved and Slagelse, and Danish national road 59 connects Vordingborg with Stege on the island of Møn.

== Attractions ==
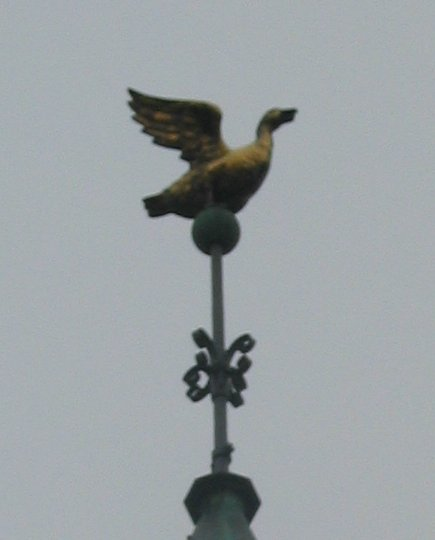
The Goose Tower (Gåsetårnet) spire in Vordingborg, Denmark. (2005)

The ruins of Vordingborg Castle, the old royal castle which was built around 1364, is the town's most famous attraction. The only fully remaining part of the castle, the 26-meter-tall (85 ft) Goose Tower (Gåsetårnet), is the symbol of the city. It is the largest of King Valdemar Atterdag's nine main castle towers. The name comes from the golden goose perched on top of the tower's spire. Legend has it that Valdemar Atterdag used the symbol to taunt the Hanseatic League. The current goose was put there in 1871. It is not certain what was on top of the tower before 1871 and maybe it was just a weather vane made of gold. The tower was transferred into the national trust on 24 December 1808 and is thus the first protected historic monument in Denmark.

A historic garden is also located on the site of the ruin.

Vordingborg is the home of the South Zealand Museum (Sydsjællands Museum).

The city holds an annual festival, Vordingborg Fest Week (Vordingborg Festuge) in July.

The Vordingborg Transmitter is one of the tallest towers in Denmark.

The Danish Army operates a barracks facility on the edge of town, known as Vordingborg Kaserne.

== Notable people ==
=== Academics, educators and scholars ===
- Jacob Baden (1735 in Vordingborg – 1804) a philologist, pedagogue, critic and academic
- N. F. S. Grundtvig (1783 in Udby near Vordingborg – 1872) a Danish pastor, author, poet, philosopher, historian and politician
- Martin Hammerich (1811 - 1881 in Iselingen) an art historian, educator, author and translator.
- Frederik Christian Kielsen (1774–1850), a Danish schoolmaster, published copiously illustrated books on natural history; he lectured at the Latin School in Vordingborg from 1819 to 1833
- Carl Lange (1834 in Vordingborg – 1900), a physician, worked on neurology, psychiatry and psychology
- Julius Lange (1838 in Vordingborg – 1896), a Danish art historian and critic

=== Architecture and design ===
- Niels Peder Christian Holsøe, Danish architect

=== Artists ===
- Nina Hole, artist

=== Businesspeople ===
- Hans Wassard (1756–1839), businessman and landowner

=== Music ===
- Anders Trentemøller (born 1974 in Vordingborg) an electronic music producer and multi-instrumentalist

=== Politics and activism ===
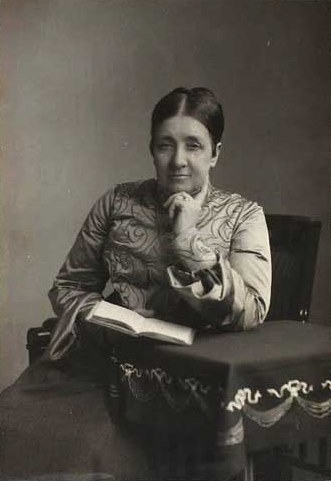
Astrid Stampe Feddersen, 1910

- Astrid Stampe Feddersen (1852 in Christinelund – 1930), a Danish women's rights activist
- Johannes Friis-Skotte (1874 in Vordingborg – 1946), a Danish politician and minister
- Clara Tybjerg (1864–1941), women's rights activist

=== Royalty and nobility ===
- Johan Friis ( 1494–1570), Danish statesman and landowner
- Anne Lykke (1595 in Vordingborg Castle – 1641) a Danish noblewoman and royal mistress of Christian, Prince Elect of Denmark
- Valdemar II of Denmark (1170–1241 in Vordingborg Castle), King of Denmark 1202–1241.

=== Sport ===
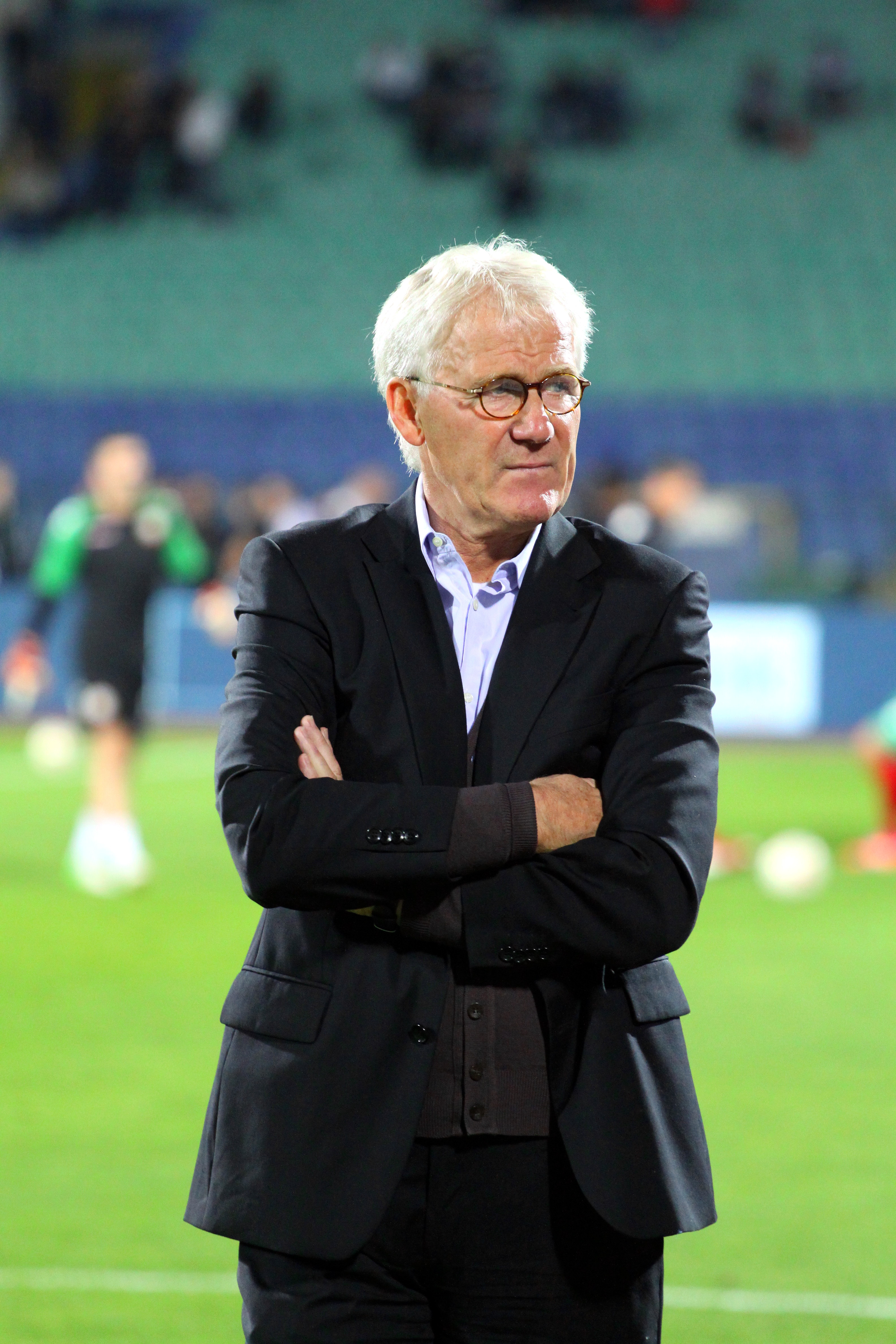
Morten Olsen, 2012

- Vagn Ingerslev (1885 in Vordingborg – 1952) a tennis player, competed at the 1912 Summer Olympics
- Morten Olsen (born 1949) former footballer with 531 club caps and 102 for Denmark with whom he was head coach from 2000 until 2015
- Birger Pedersen (born 1950 in Vordingborg) a Danish former footballer, 14 caps for Denmark
- Steven Lustü (born 1971 in Vordingborg) a Danish former footballer with 9 caps for Denmark

=== Writers ===
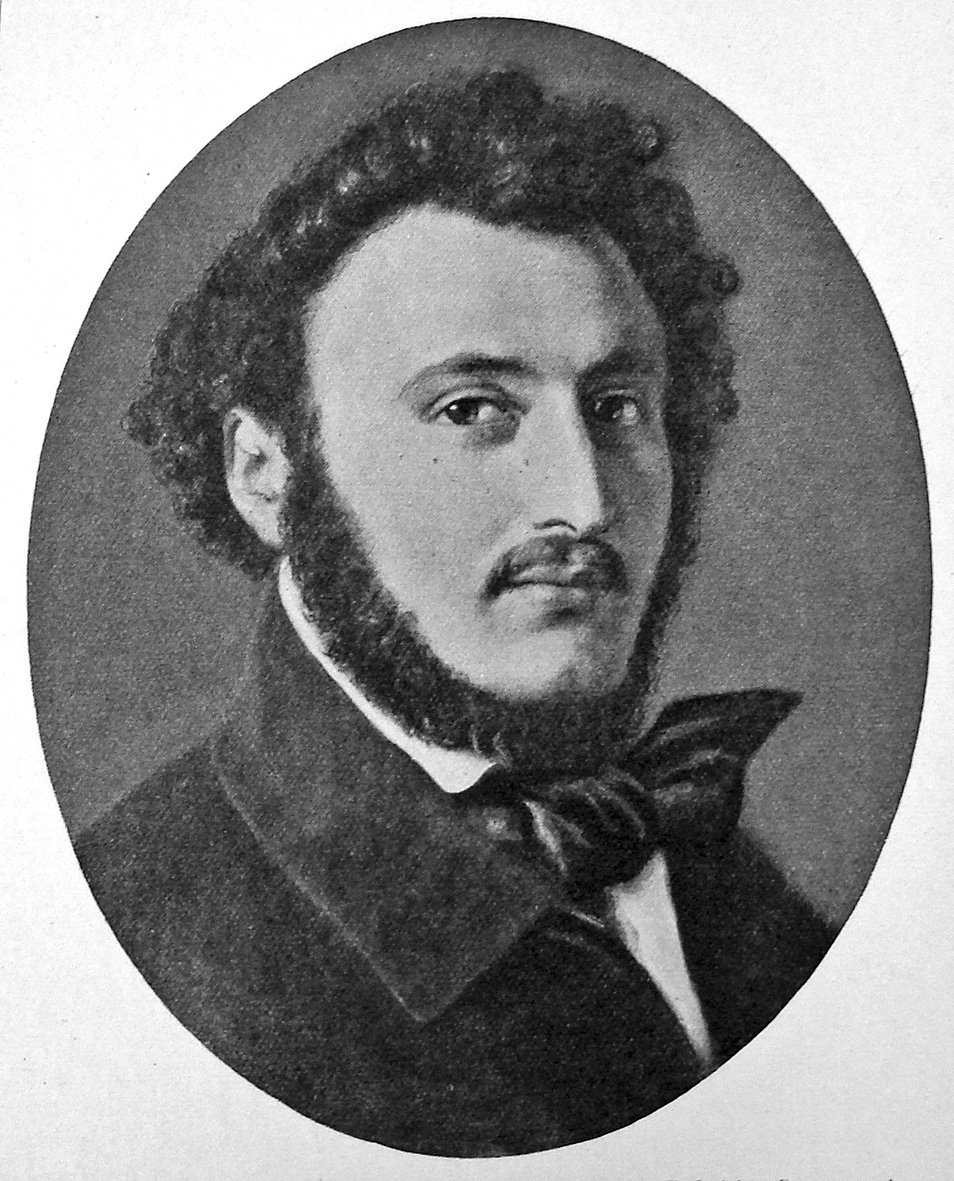
Meïr Aron Goldschmidt

- Jesper Ewald (1893 in Vordingborg – 1969 in Copenhagen), an author, journalist and translator
- Meïr Aron Goldschmidt (1819 in Vordingborg – 1887), a publisher, journalist and novelist
- Peter Andreas Heiberg (1758 in Vordingborg - 1841), a Danish author and philologist

=== Other ===
- Jacob Ellehammer (1871 in Bakkebølle – 1946) a Danish watchmaker, inventor and contributor to powered flight
- Jesper Juul (born 1948 in Vordingborg) a family therapist and author on parenting

== Twin towns ==
Vordingborg is twinned with:

- Słupsk, Poland - since 1994.

== See also ==
- Vordingborg Castle
- Farø Bridges
- Masnedsund Bridge
- Storstrøm Bridge
