= Bogø =

Island in the Baltic Sea

Coordinates: 54°56′N 12°02′E

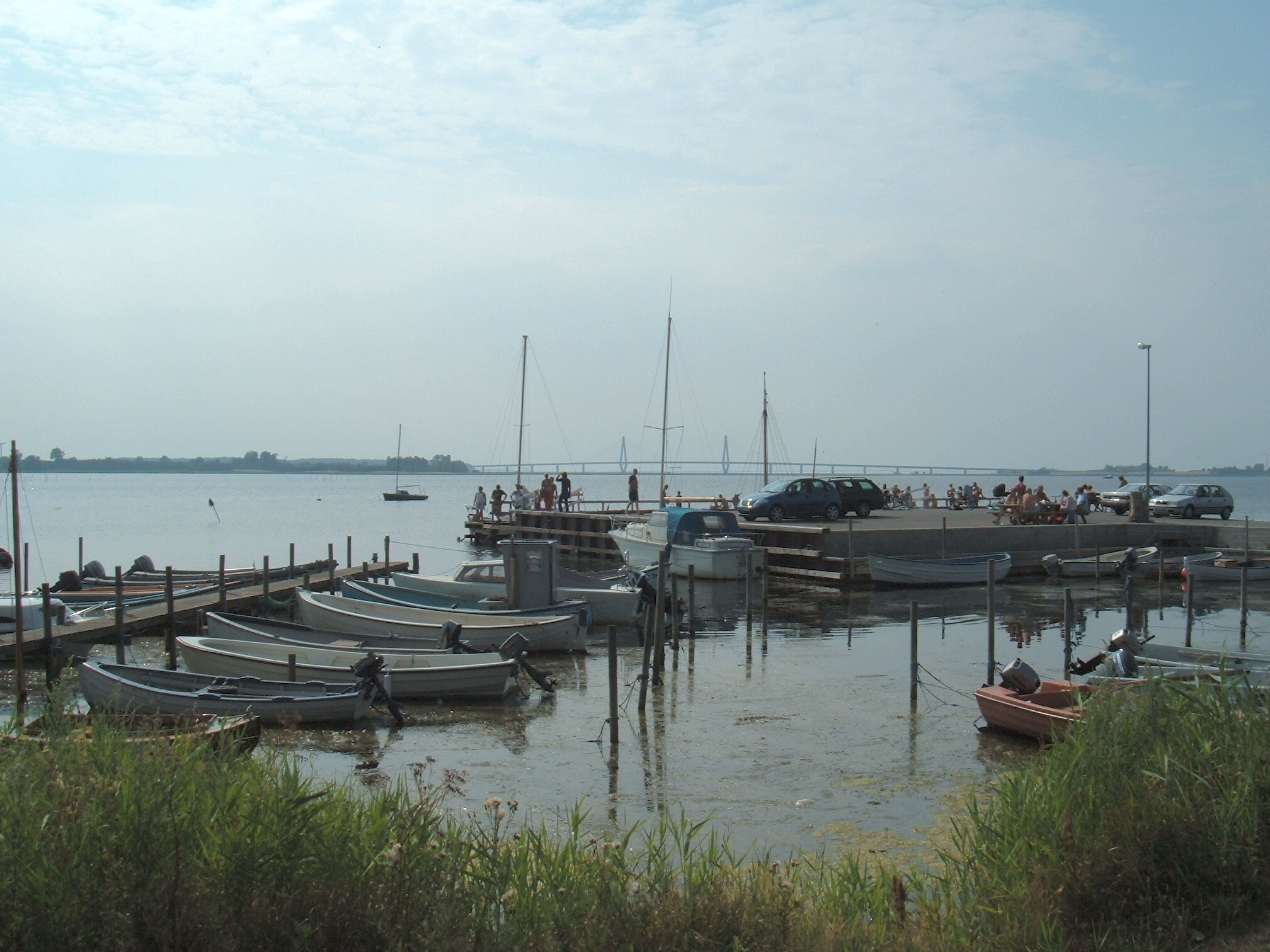
Bogø north harbour, Skåningebro

Bogø (Danish pronunciation: [ˈpɔwˌøˀ]) is a Danish island in the Baltic Sea, just west of Møn. The population is 1,173 (1 January 2026) with 897 living in the only town on the island, Bogø By. The island is approximately 7 km long by 3 km wide at the largest points, with a total area of 13 km^{2}. The highest point of the island is 32 metres above sea level.

To the west of Bogø is a smaller island, Farø, which carries the E47/E55 motorway from Copenhagen to the major islands of Lolland and Falster. The routes continue via ferry to Germany. Bogø is connected by causeways to both Farø and Møn, and carries one of the two main routes for vehicles travelling to Møn. It is part of Vordingborg Municipality.

The island has a varied landscape including wooded areas and traditional villages. To the northwest of the island at Skåninge is a small harbour and bathing jetty. To the south east is a larger harbour with a car ferry which operates during summer months to Stubbekøbing on Falster. Near the centre of the island is a preserved windmill from 1852, which is being restored to form a working museum.

The island was for a long time part of the crown estates. In 1769 it was offered for sale, and purchased by the islanders for 18,456 rigsdaler. To pay for this, the islanders cut down much of the forest then growing on the island.

== Hulehøj ==
In the north east of the island, in the wooded region, is a well preserved passage grave at Hulehøj. The burial chamber is 6.3m long, originally accessed via a 5.5m tunnel. This passage grave is estimated to have been built about 3200 BC in the Nordic Stone Age. The stones weigh up to 10 tons and were apparently moved and lifted by rollers, sledges and lifting bars when constructed. Hule means hollow, and høj, from the Old Norse word haugr, means hill or mound.

== Cultural references ==
The Bogø-Stubbekøbing ferry is used as a location at 1:11:31 in the first Olsen Gang film.

== Gallery ==
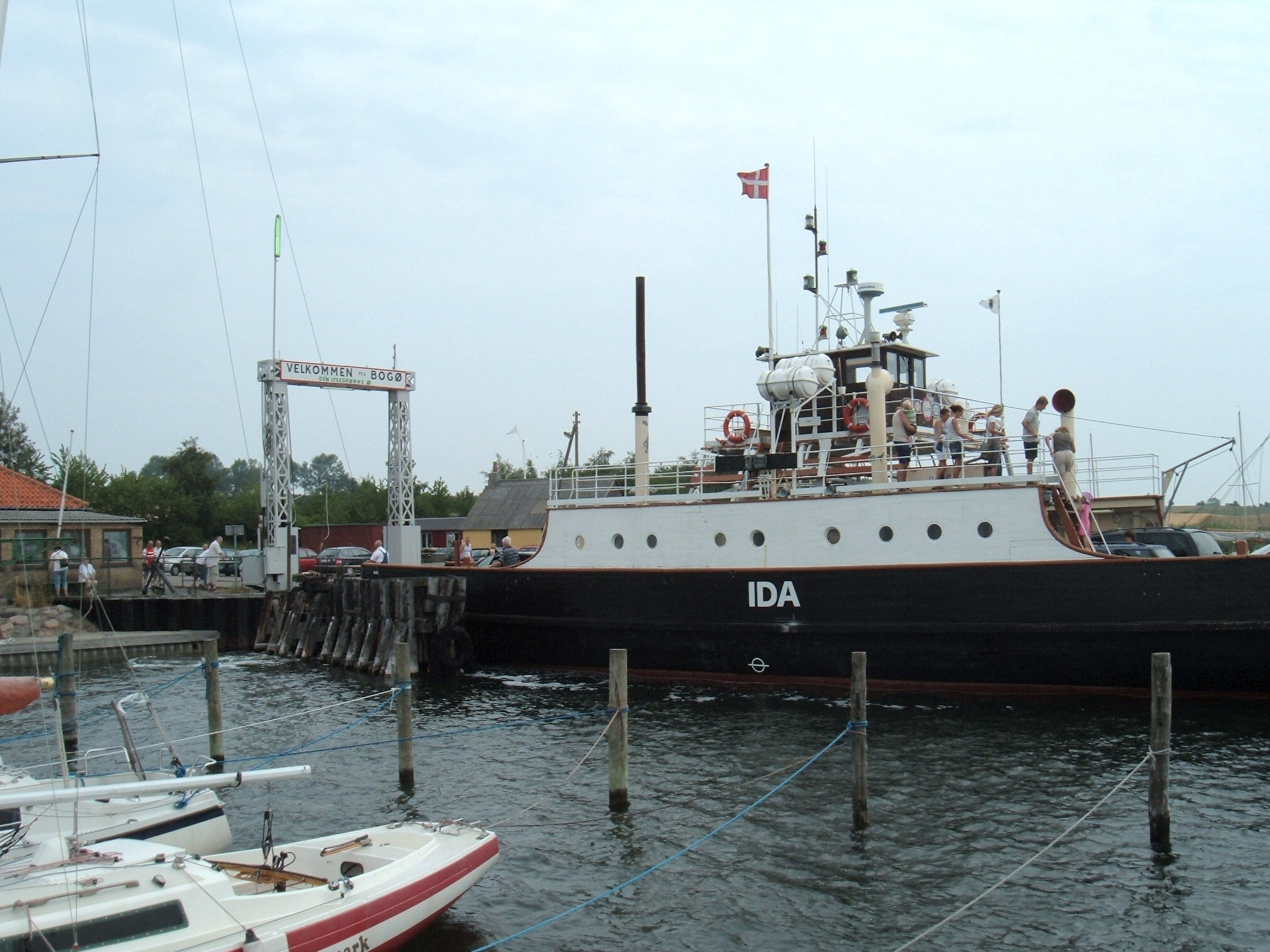
Bogø ferry Ida to Falster

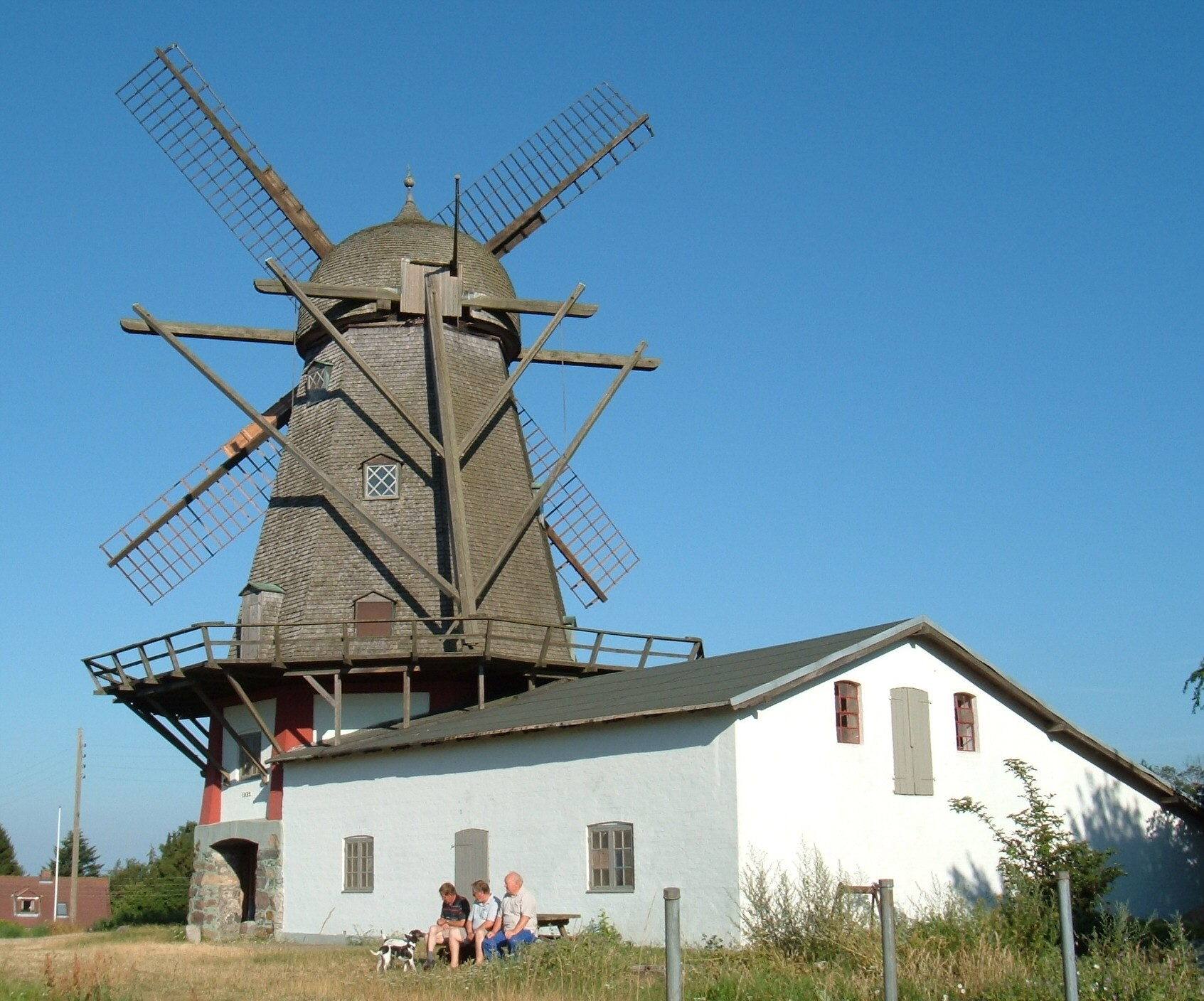
Preserved Mill

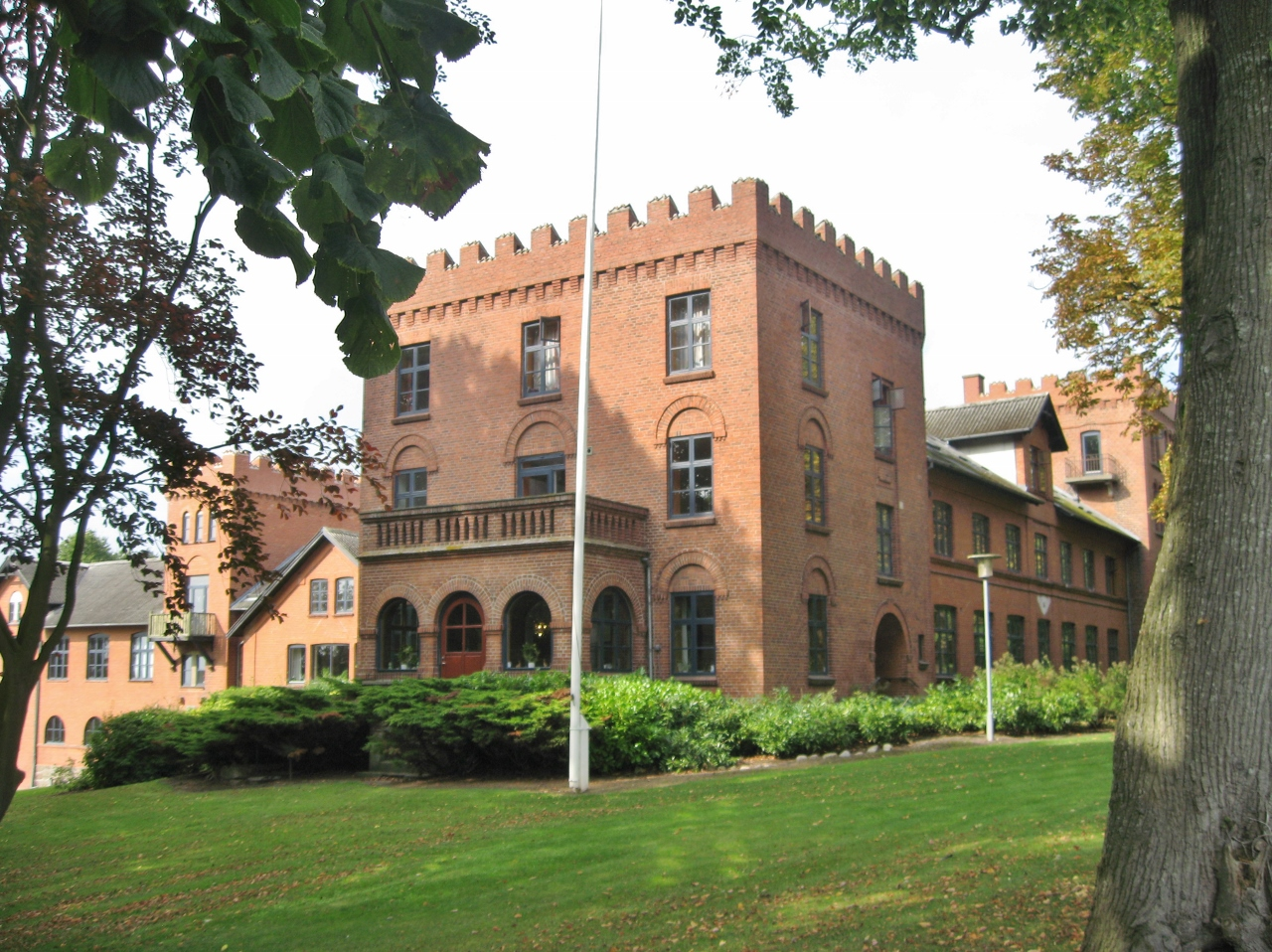
Bogø Kostskole. Boarding school. Main building from 1893. The towers are later additions

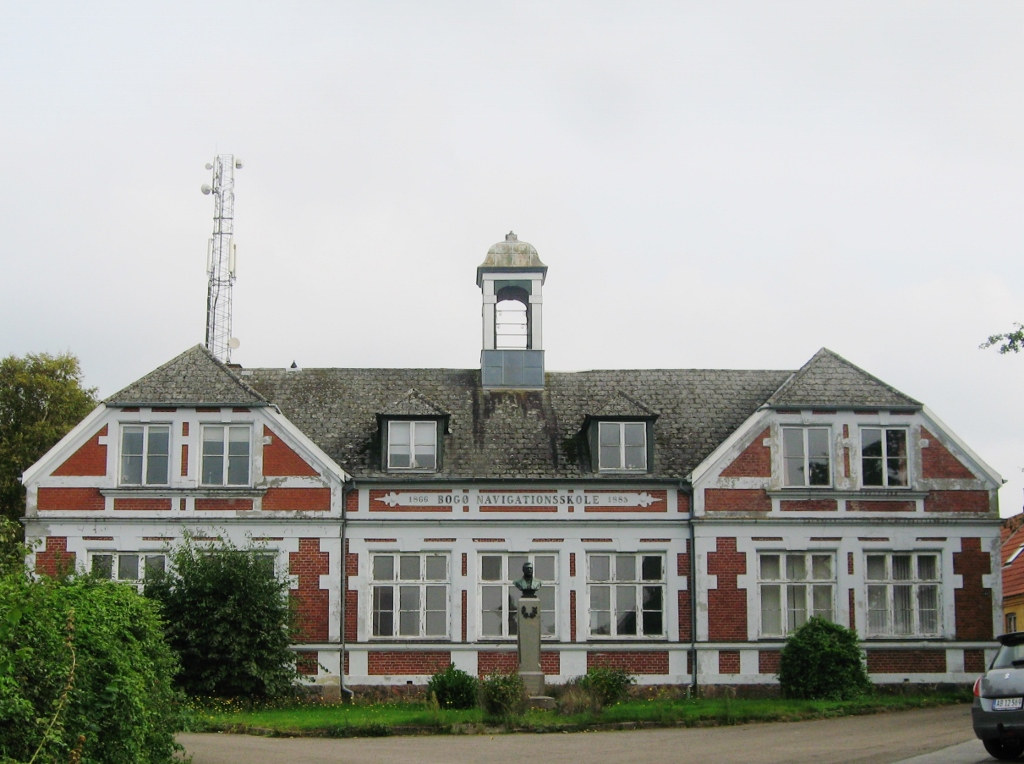
Bogø Navigationsskole. Main building (1885)

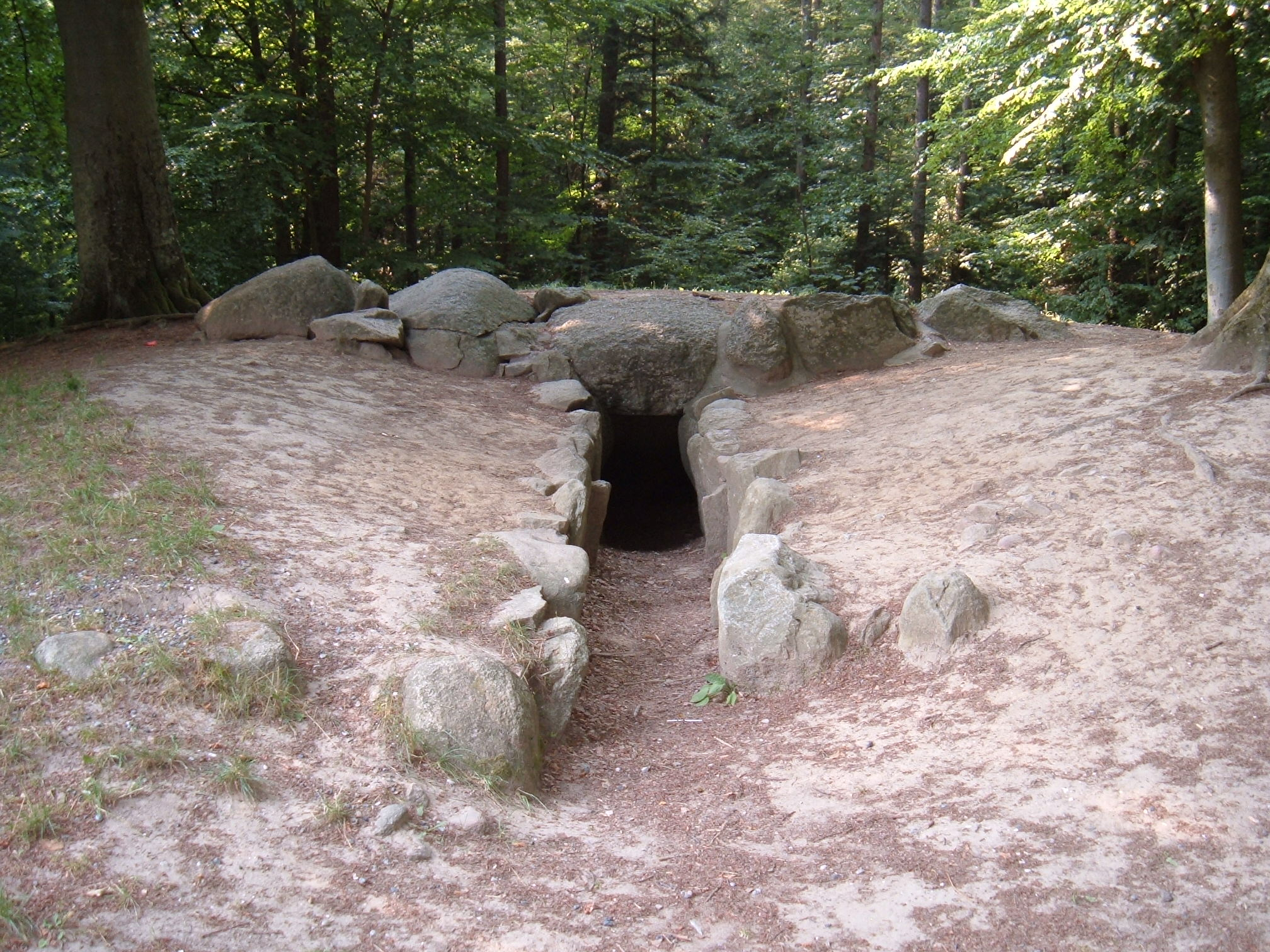
Hulehøj passage grave

== Notable people ==
- Cecilie Thomsen (born 1974 in Bogø) a Danish actress and model

== See also ==
- List of islands of Denmark
