= Stensved =

- Town
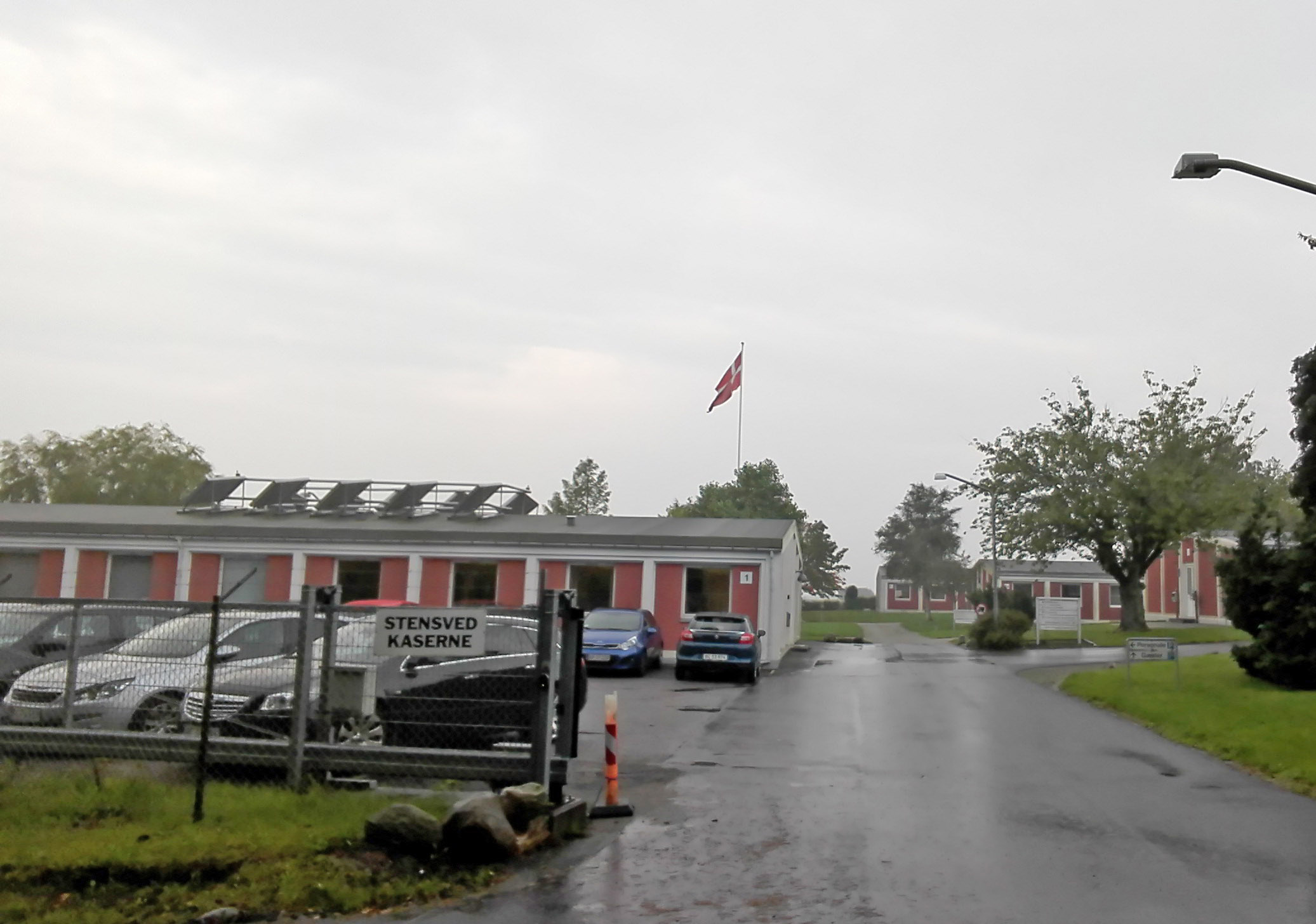
- The former Stensved barracks, now parish hall

- Location in Region Zealand Stensved (Denmark)
- Coordinates: 54.99538°N 12.02445°E
- Country: Denmark
- Region: Region Sjælland
- Municipality: Vordingborg

Area
  - Urban: 1 km^{2} (0.39 sq mi)

Population (2026)
  - Urban: 1,504
  - Urban density: 1,500/km^{2} (3,900/sq mi)
- Time zone: UTC+1 (CET)
  - Summer (DST): UTC+2 (CEST)
- Postal Code: DK-4773 Stensved

Stensved is a town with a population of 1,504 (as of 1. January 2026). It is located 10 km east of Vordingborg on southern Zealand in Vordingborg Municipality, Region Zealand in Denmark.

The area what is now Stensved was inhabited already in the Iron Age, which stretched from 500 BC to 500 AD in Denmark.

== Community ==
Kulsbjerg Skole - the school in Stensved

Kulsbjerg Skole, is a middleschool located in Stensved, which is named after the peak "Kulsbjerg", situated 5 km northeast from Stensved. Kulsbjerg is the highest point of the southern Zealand, reaching up 107m.
