= Nyråd =

- Town
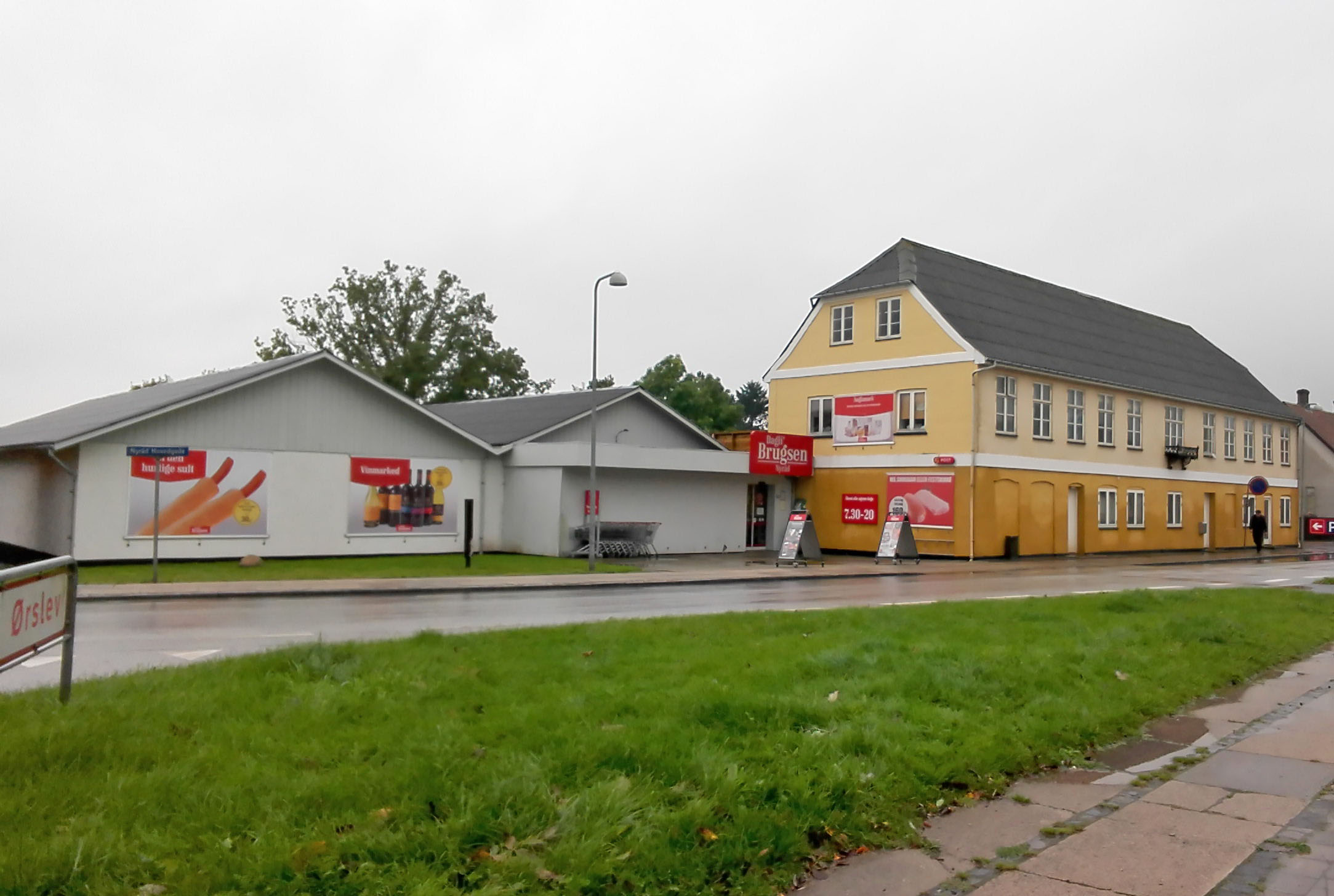

- Location in Region Zealand Nyråd (Denmark)
- Coordinates: 55°0′12″N 11°58′10″E
- Country: Denmark
- Region: Region Zealand
- Municipality: Vordingborg Municipality

Area
  - Urban: 1.6 km^{2} (0.62 sq mi)

Population (2026)
  - Urban: 2,563
  - Urban density: 1,600/km^{2} (4,100/sq mi)
- Time zone: UTC+1 (CET)
  - Summer (DST): UTC+2 (CEST)
- Postal codes: 4760

Nyråd is a town and satellite community to Vordingborg with a population of 2,563 (1 January 2026). It is located in Vordingborg Municipality 4 km east of central Vordingborg in Region Zealand in Denmark.
