= Ørslev, Vordingborg =

Ørslev
- Town
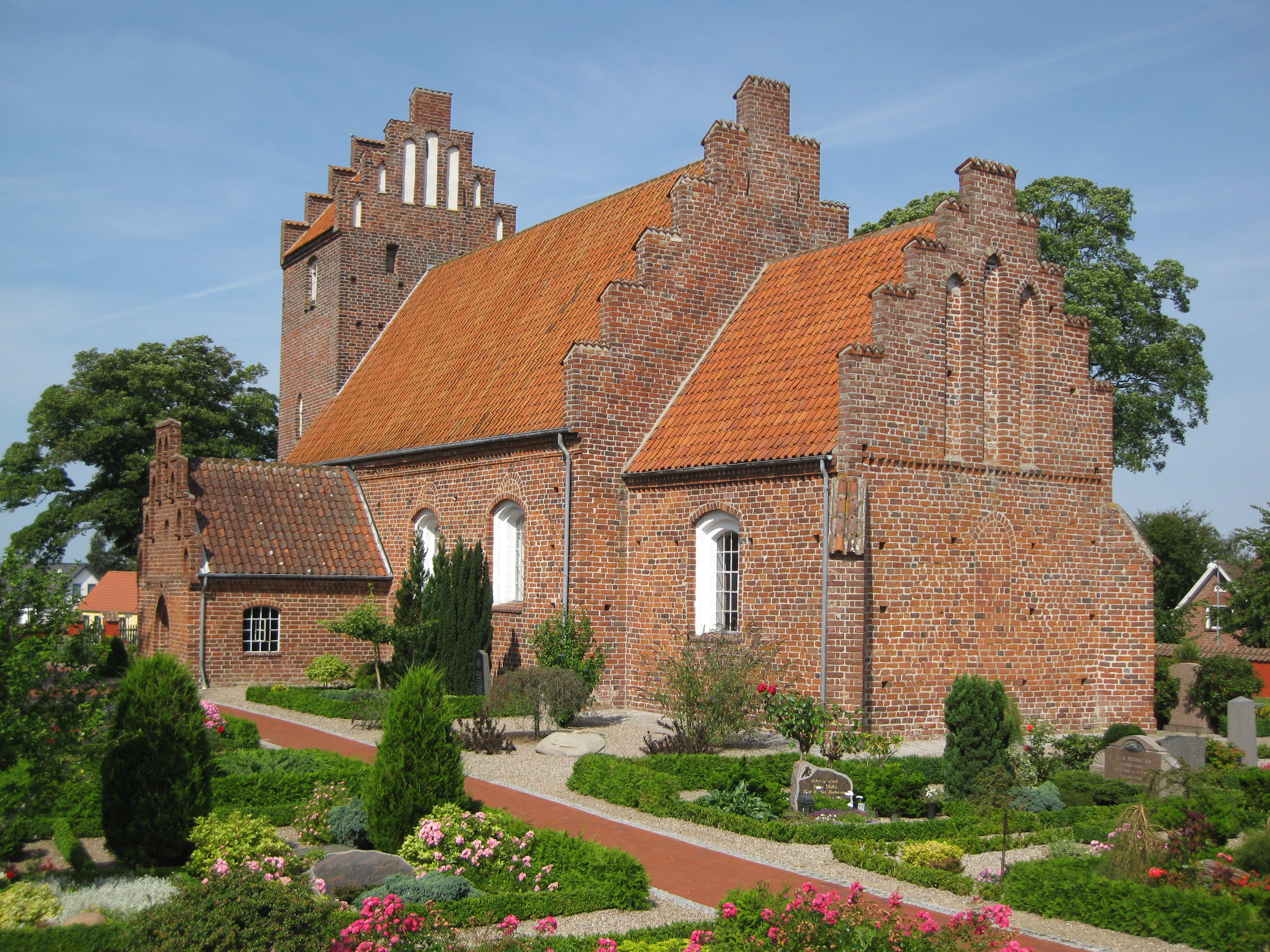
- Ørslev Church

- Location in Region Zealand Ørslev (Denmark)
- Coordinates: 55°2′41″N 11°58′11″E
- Country: Denmark
- Region: Region Zealand
- Municipality: Vordingborg

Area
  - Urban: 1.7 km^{2} (0.66 sq mi)

Population (2026)
  - Urban: 2,023
  - Urban density: 1,200/km^{2} (3,100/sq mi)
- Time zone: UTC+1 (CET)
  - Summer (DST): UTC+2 (CEST)
- Postal code: DK-4760 Vordingborg

Ørslev is a town with a population of 2,023 (as of 2026) in Vordingborg Municipality, Region Zealand in Denmark.

Ørslev Church is located in the town. It is a Romanesque inspired church built approximately 1260.
