= Suhr (surname) =

Suhr is a German-language surname. It originated primarily as a nickname for a bitter or cantankerous person, derived from the Middle Low German word sūr ("sour"), or as a habitational name from places named Suhr in Schleswig-Holstein. The name subsequently spread into Scandinavia, particularly Denmark.

Notable people with the name include:

- Alex Suhr (1898–1964), Danish actor
- Brendan Suhr (born 1951), American basketball coach
- Charles Suhr (1885–1930), Australian rules footballer
- Daniel Suhr (1964–2001), American firefighter, victim of the September 11 attacks
- Friedrich Suhr (1907–1946), German lawyer and SS-Obersturmbannführer
- Gus Suhr (1906–2004), American baseball player
- Jenn Suhr (born 1982), American pole vaulter
- Leandro Suhr (born 1997), Uruguayan football player
- Marianne Suhr (born c. 1969), British television presenter
- Otto Suhr (1894–1957), German politician
- Rick Suhr (born 1967), American pole vault coach
- Trish Suhr (born 1974), American actress
- William Suhr (1896–1984), American art conservator
- Suhr family
  - Johan Peter Suhr (1712–1785), Danish merchant
  - Johannes Theodorus Suhr (1792–1858), Danish merchant and industrialist
  - Ole Berendt Suhr (1813–1875), Danish merchant, investor, landowner and philanthropist
    - Ida Marie Suhr (1853–1938), Danish philanthropist and estate owner, his daughter
  - Johannes Theodor Suhr (1896–1997), Danish Roman Catholic bishop

== See also ==
- Suhr (disambiguation)
