= Suhr family =

The Suhr family is a Danish family whose earliest member is Bernt Suhr (c. 1615 – October 28, 1685) who came to Denmark from Germany in the service of Duke Frederick in 1648. Many early family members were priests or merchants. Johan Peter Suhr founded J.P. Suhr & Søn, a trading house which existed from 1749 to 1897.His grandson Johannes Theodorus Suhr founded the Suhr Family Trust (Den Suhrske Stiftelse). It owns the Suhr House in Copenhagen as well as the manor houses Bonderup at Holbæk.

== Bernt Suhr (c. 1615 – October 28, 1685) ==
Bernt Suhr was born somewhere in Germany in circa 1615. Nothing is known about his early life. He was in Bremen in circa 1635 where he was employed as livkarl (chancellor) by Duke Frederick (later Frederick III), son of Christian IV of Denmark.

Bernt Suhr most likely had a brother, Claus, who in 1673 and 1674 applied for Næsby Hoved Mølle in Odense County instead of 2,484 Danish rigsdaler in outstanding wages. Claus Suhr states that he has served as court official (enspænder and hoffourer) for 35 years. It is likely that it was Bernt Suhr who arranged for Claus Suhr to be employed at the Danish court. Claus Suhr was in 1675 employed as tax officer in Nakskov. Bernt and Claus Suhr both originally used the German form Sour, Saur or Sauer. In 1663, Bernt Suhr still signed as Berendt Sour. Bernt Suhr followed Duke Frederick first to Glückstadt and then Flensburg and several of his children were probably born in those cities. In March 1648, Suhr followed Duke Frederick to Copenhagen where he ascended the throne as Frederick III on 6 July that same year. Bernt Suhr was appointed to manager of the royal household (hoffourer). Om 1661, Suhr accompanied Prince Christian (later Christian V) on his journey to Norway. In 1663, Suhr was appointed steward of Gisselfeld which was endowed to Prince Christian (later Christian V). In 16666, Suhr became steward of "the royal farm in Gentofte".

Suhr was appointed Master of the Carriages om 167+ and to fodermarskal in 1673.

In 1676, he was appointed to bryghusskriver (Manager of the Royal brewery) at the Royal Brewery. He was dismissed for an unspecified misdemeanor in April 1685 and died on 28 October 1685.

Bernt Suhr married Margrethe Johansdatter Krammer at circa 1641. They had the children:

- Caspar Suhr (1642 - 1701), provost and pastor of Saksild and Nølev
- Friederich Suhr (October 20, 1644 - December 20, 1706), county manager of Lolland and Falster
- Anna Elisabeth Suhr (1656 - 1730), married Hans Thomsen Borch (died 1702), pastor of Hvedstrup and Fløng, and married second time to his successor Albert Kjeldsen Schytte (1668-1744)
- Johann Christopher Suhr (1645 - 1709), custom officer in Aarhus

== Property ==
The estates Bonderup and Merløsegaard are owned by Den Suhrske Stiftelse. The estate Rosengaard has also been owned by members of the Suhr family for several generations.

== Other notable family members ==
- Friederich Suhr (1644-1706), county manager of Lolland and Falster
- Johan Peter Suhr (1712-1785), founder of J.P. Suhr & Søn
- Ole Bernt Suhr (1762-1815)
- Johannes Theodorus Suhr. merchant and
- Ole Berendt Suhr (1813–1875), merchant and founder of Suhrs Friboliger
- Ida Marie Suhr (1853–1938, wealthy philanthropist and estate owner
- Nelly Erichsen (1862–1918), British painter and illustrator
- Johannes Theodor Suhr (1896-1997), bishop
