= Kompagnistræde 21 =

Protected building in Denmark

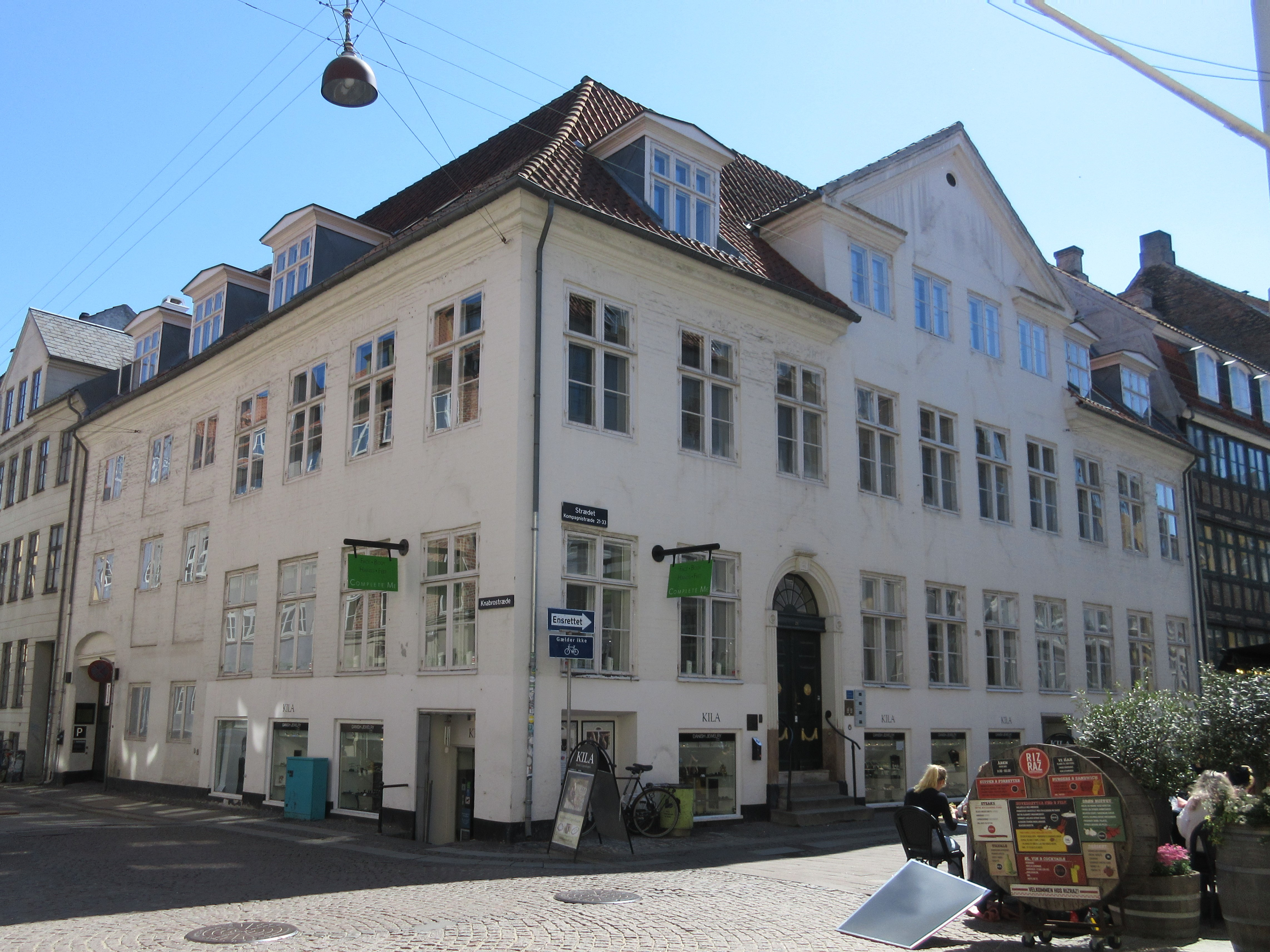
- Interactive map of the Kompagnistræde 21 area

General information
- Architectural style: Baroque
- Location: Copenhagen, Denmark
- Coordinates: 55°40′40.04″N 12°34′36.19″E
- Completed: 1730

Kompagnistræde 21 is an 18th century property situated at the corner of Kompagnistræde (No. 21) and Knabrostræde (No. 20) in the Old Town of Copenhagen, Denmark. It was listed in the Danish registry of protected buildings and places in 1918.

== History ==
=== Otto Lerche's brewery ===
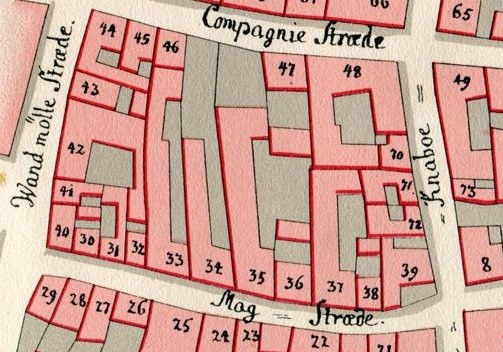
No. 48 seen on a detail from Christian Gedde's map of Snaren's Quarter, 1757.

The site was formerly made up of four separate properties, listed in Copenhagen's first cadastre of 1689 as No. 52, No. 53, No. 72 and No. 73 in Snaren's Quarter (Snarens Kvarter). They were at that time owned by Christian Brant. (No. 62), locksmith (kleinsmed) Peder Christensen. (No. 53), Søren Pedersen (No. 72) and Svend Bendsen. (No. 73)

No. 52 was owned by brewer Hans Andersen Rold from 31 October 1713. He was married to Kirsten Lyngbye; after his death on 1 May 1720, her second marriage was to Otto Lerche. The son of a pastor from Svindinge on Funen, Lerche had originally intended to follow in his father's footsteps, having graduated as a theologian in 1715. On 3 July 1719, he had been granted royal permission to lease Kristiansholm for an annual rent of 20 wagon loads of hay. After his marriage to Kirsten Lyngbye he turned to brewing, continuing the brewery in Kompagnistræde that she had brought into the marriage. The brewery, together with most of the other buildings in the area, was destroyed in the Copenhagen Fire of 1728. After the fire, Lerche bought the adjacent fire sites of No. 53, No. 72 and No. 73 and merged them into a single property. The current building on the site was constructed for him in 1730 by master mason Lars Erichsen and master carpenter Olle Nicolaisen. The adjacent property at No. 74 (now Knabrostræde 22) was also built for Lerche, The Lerche family found a temporary home at Lille Torvegade No. 15 in Christianshavn while the new buildings were constructed. From 1730 until 1744, Lerche was one of the city's 32 Men and also director of Enkekassen. In 1731, he was mentioned as alderman of the Brewers' Guild.

=== Falch family ===
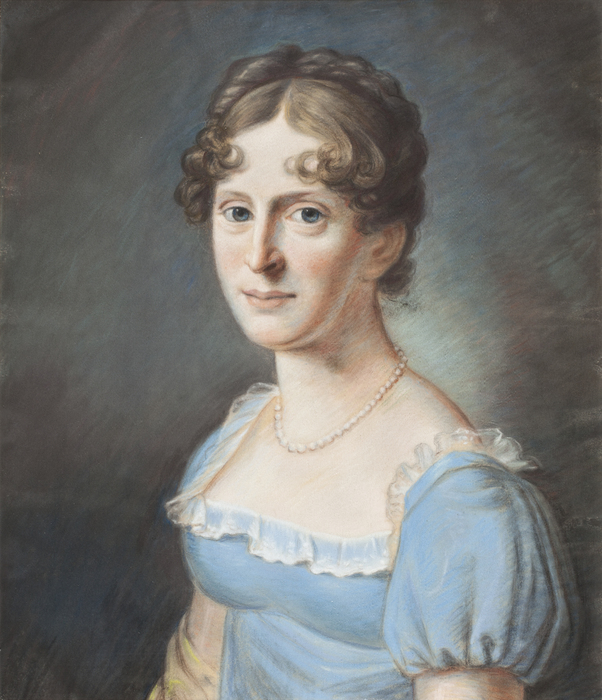
Christine Caroline Andrea Suhr née Falch), born in the building in 1790.

At the time of the 1787 census, No. 49 was owned by merchant (grosserer) Andreas Falch (1748–1797). He lived there with his wife Charlotte Sophie Falch (née Suhr), their four children (aged one to six), a servant, a caretaker, a female cook, a maid, a nanny and a wet nurse. Caspar Rotting, a senior clerk (fuldmægtig) working for Falck, also resided in the building with his wife Boline Westgaard and two maids.

The building was listed as No. 50 in the new cadastre of 1806. It was still owned by Charlotte Falch & Son at the time.

The family's trading house was continued by Charlotte Sophie Suhr and her son Johan Peter Falch after Andreas Falch's death in 1797. The home in Kompagnistræde was known for its merry and luxurious social life. Charlotte Sophie Suhr was the daughter of Johan Peter Suhr. Falch's sister was married to the financial advisor. At the age of 15, Caroline Falch was sent down to Fensmark Rectory for her confirmation. She was engaged to Georg Koës' son Georg Koës in 1806 and after his death married her cousin Johannes Theodorus Suhr. The Falch family's trading house crumbled during the unfavourable economic times that followed the British bombardment of Copenhagen in 1807.

=== 1840 census ===
At the time of the 1840 census, No. 50 was home to 28 people. The once-stately bourgeois townhouse had now been divided into multiple dwellings. Martha Solomonsen, the 65-year-old widow of Salomon Moses Salomonsen (1775–1838), resided in one of the ground floor apartments with four unmarried children (aged 25 to 32). Hans Jensen, a beer vendor (øltapper), resided in the other ground floor apartment with his wife Johanne Hansdatter, a lodger and two maids, and their three children (aged two to eight). Peter Christian Dresing, a civil servant in Rentekammeret, resided in one of the second floor apartments with his wife Christine Mathilde Clasen and a maid. Karen Assens, the widow of a provost, resided in the other second floor apartment with her three children (aged seven to 18) and a maid. Marie Elisabeth Eriksen, the widow of a customs officer, resided on the second floor with two unmarried sons (aged 35 and 37), a student lodger and a maid.

=== C. J. Meyer ===
In 1851, No. 50 was acquired by Carl Julius Meyer (1824–1888) as a new home for his distillery J. C. Meyer. The company had been founded by his father Martin Meyer in Peder Madsens Gang c. 1818 and taken over by Meyer in 1849. At the time of the 1860 census, No. 50 was home to a total of 37 people in the front wing and another four people in the rear wing. Carl Julius Meyer resided in one of the two ground floor apartments with his wife Wilhelmine Meyer, their three children (aged two to eight), four male employees and three maids. Hans Christian Nygaard, cashier of Tivoli Gardens, resided on the first floor with his wife Emma Thomine Nygaard and one maid.

In 1877, he expanded his presence in the area with Magstrædes Dampmølle (Magstræde Steam Mill) at Magstræde 10 on the other side of the block.

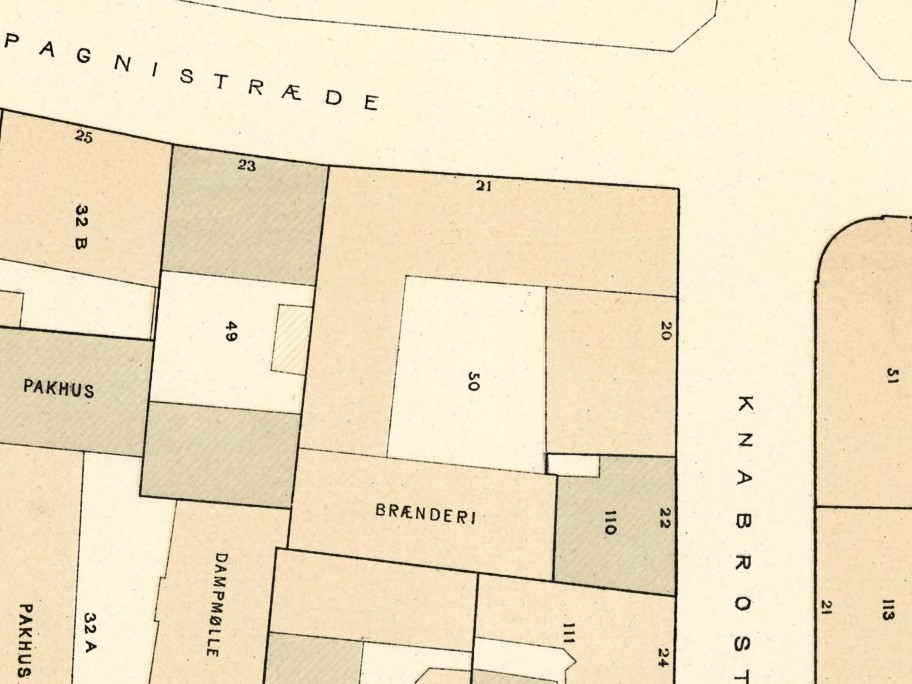
Lpmpagnistræde 21 seen on a detail from Berggreen's cadastral map of Snaren's Quarter, 1884.

At the time of the 1880 census, Kompagnistræde 21 was home to a total of 47 people. Carl Julius Meyer, now a widower, was still residing on the ground floor in the building with three of his seven children (aged 15 to 25), a female clerk and a maid.

After C. J. Meyer's death in 1888, the company was continued by his son Julius Oluf Meyer. In 1903, following a reconstruction, C. J. Meyer was ceded to J. O. Meyer's elder brother Martin Ludvig Meyer. The company was continued by his widow (née Manniche) after M. L. Meyer's death in 1906, with his son Robert Valdemar Meyer as management. C. J. Meyer was leased by A/S Kbhvn.s Spritfabrikker from 1903 until 1909, a merger of which M. L. Meyer had served as managing director. Magstrædes Dampmølle was continued by J. O. Meyer.

=== Later history ===
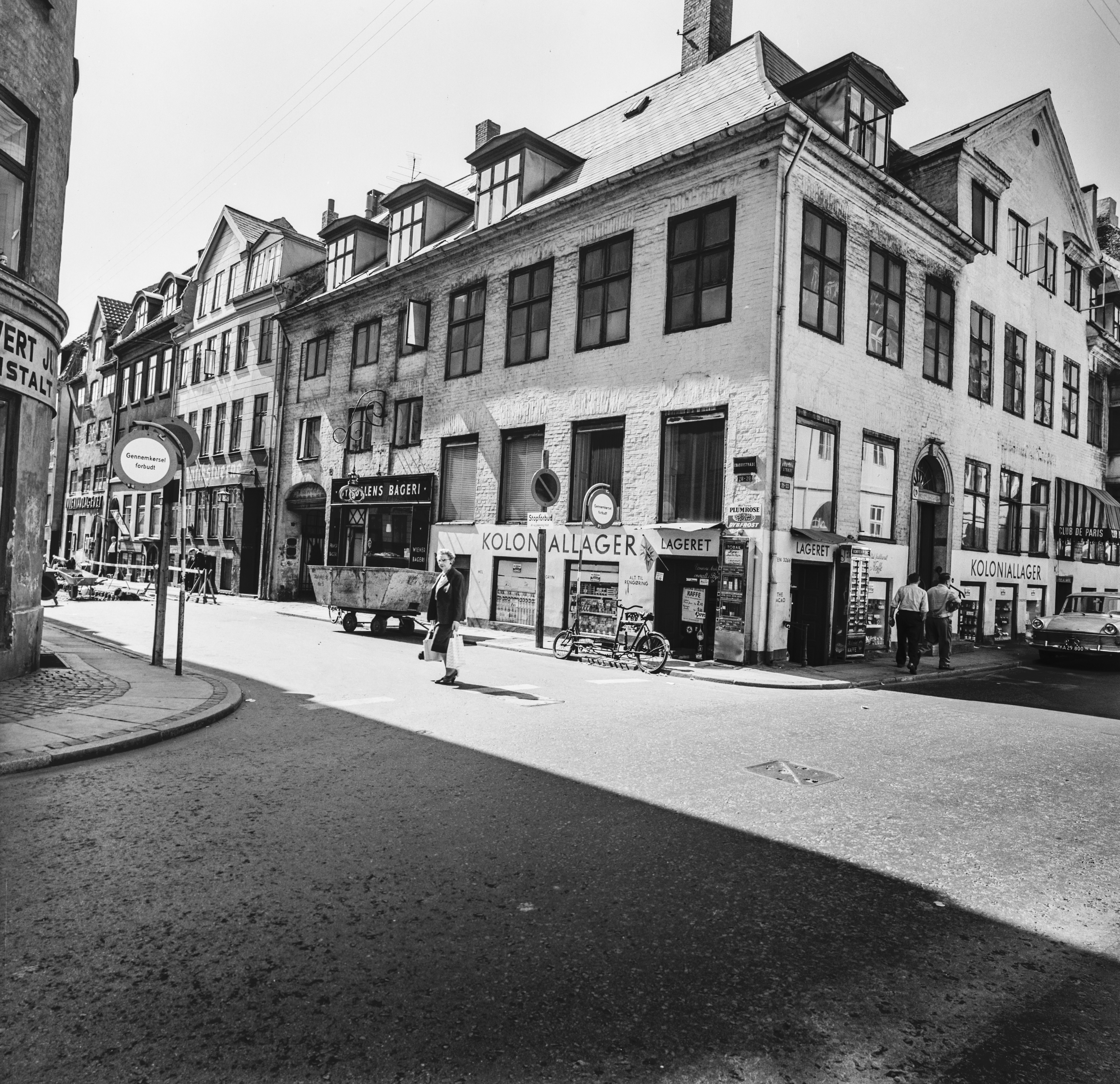
The building in 1963.

The property was at some point acquired by Michael Goldschmidt through his property company Atlas A/S. In February 2007, he sold Atlas A/S to Icelandic company Stodir (later Landic Property). In 2009, as part of the 2008–2011 Icelandic financial crisis, Landic Properties was declared in suspension of payments and went into liquidation. In October 2009, Kompagnistræde 21 was part of a portfolio of 31 former Atlas A/S properties sold for DKK 2 billions to Jeudan.

== Today ==
Kompagnistræde 21 is currently owned by Jeudan and rented out as office space.

== Gallery ==
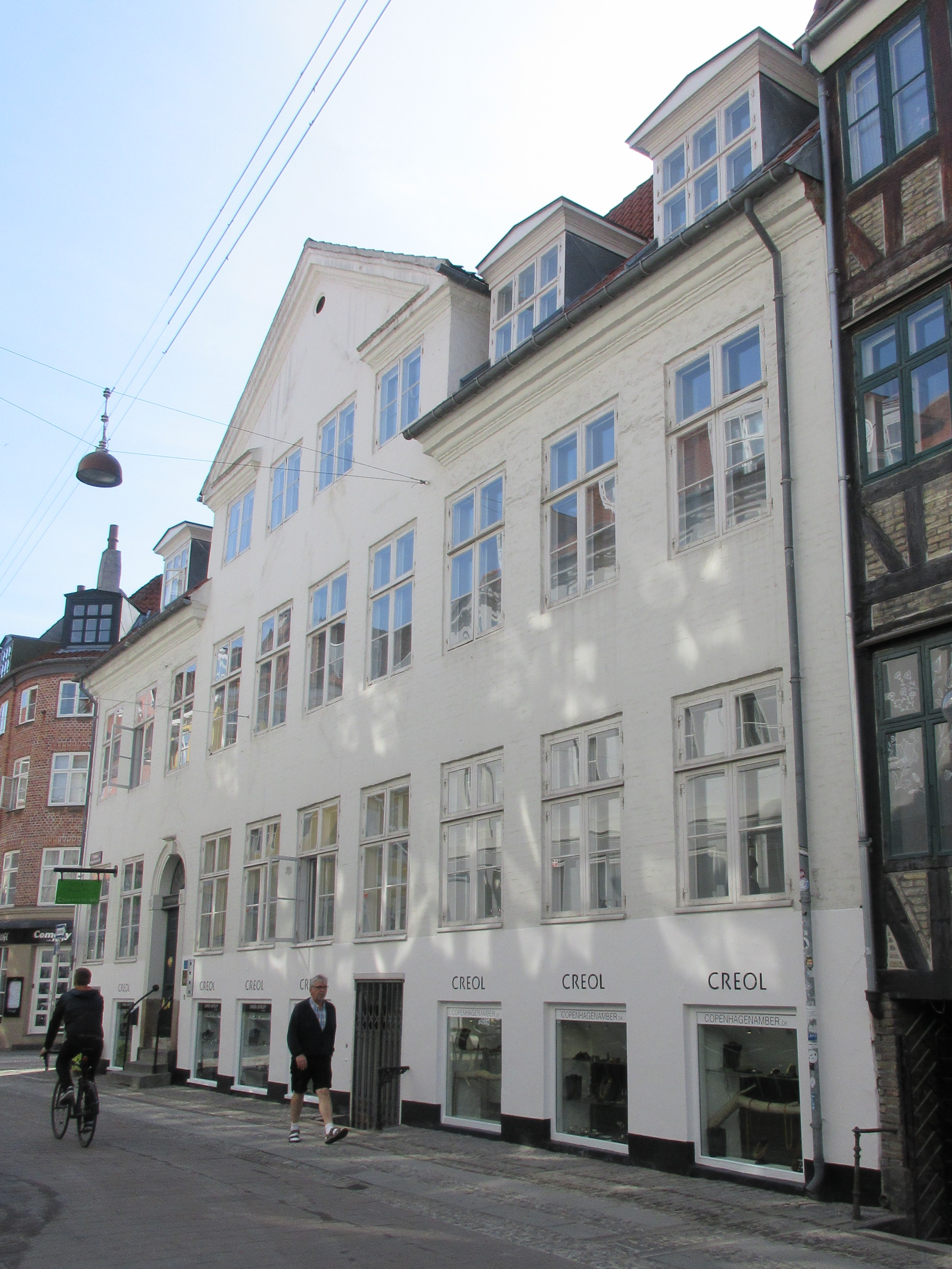
The facade on Kompagnistræde

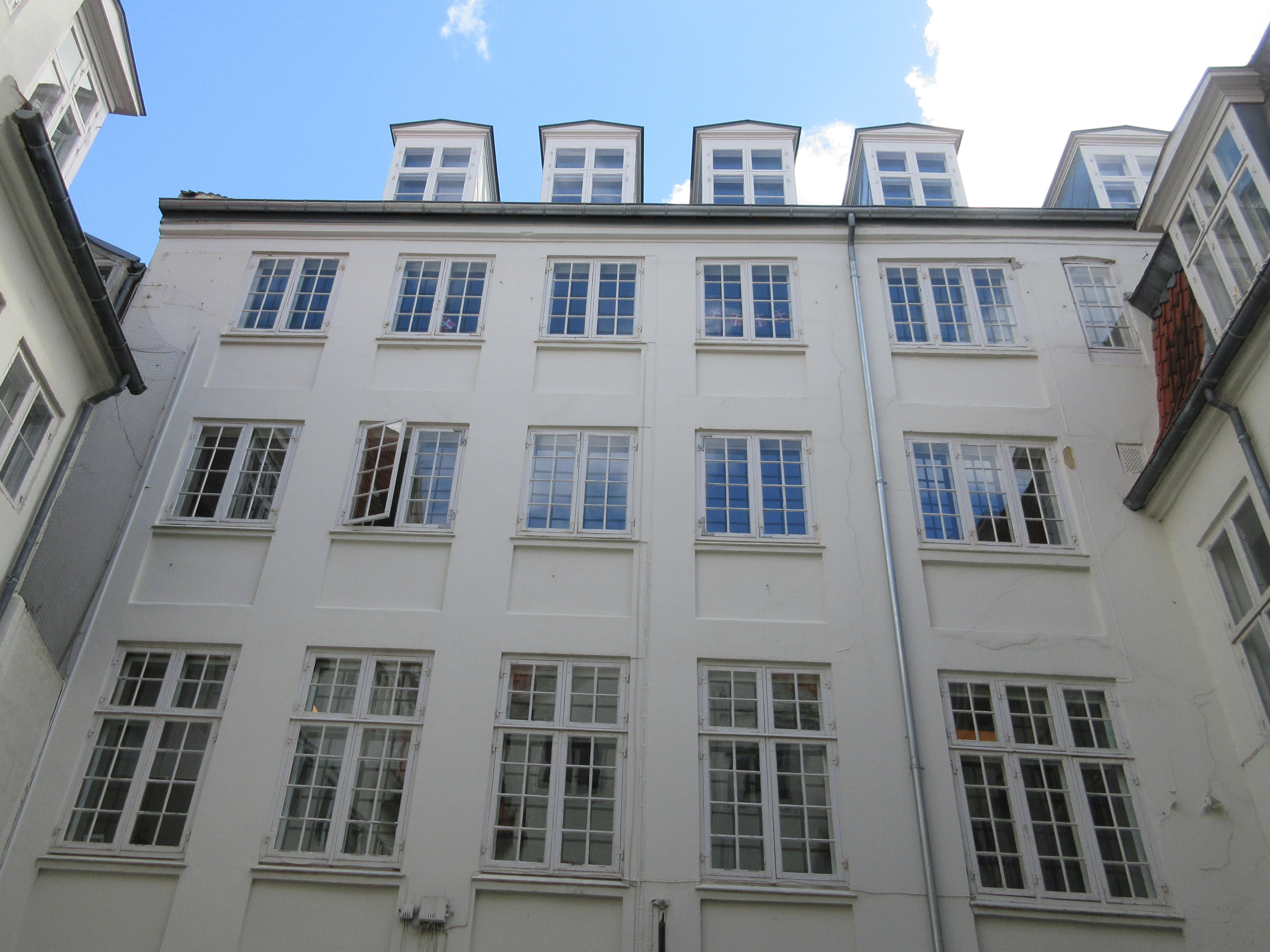

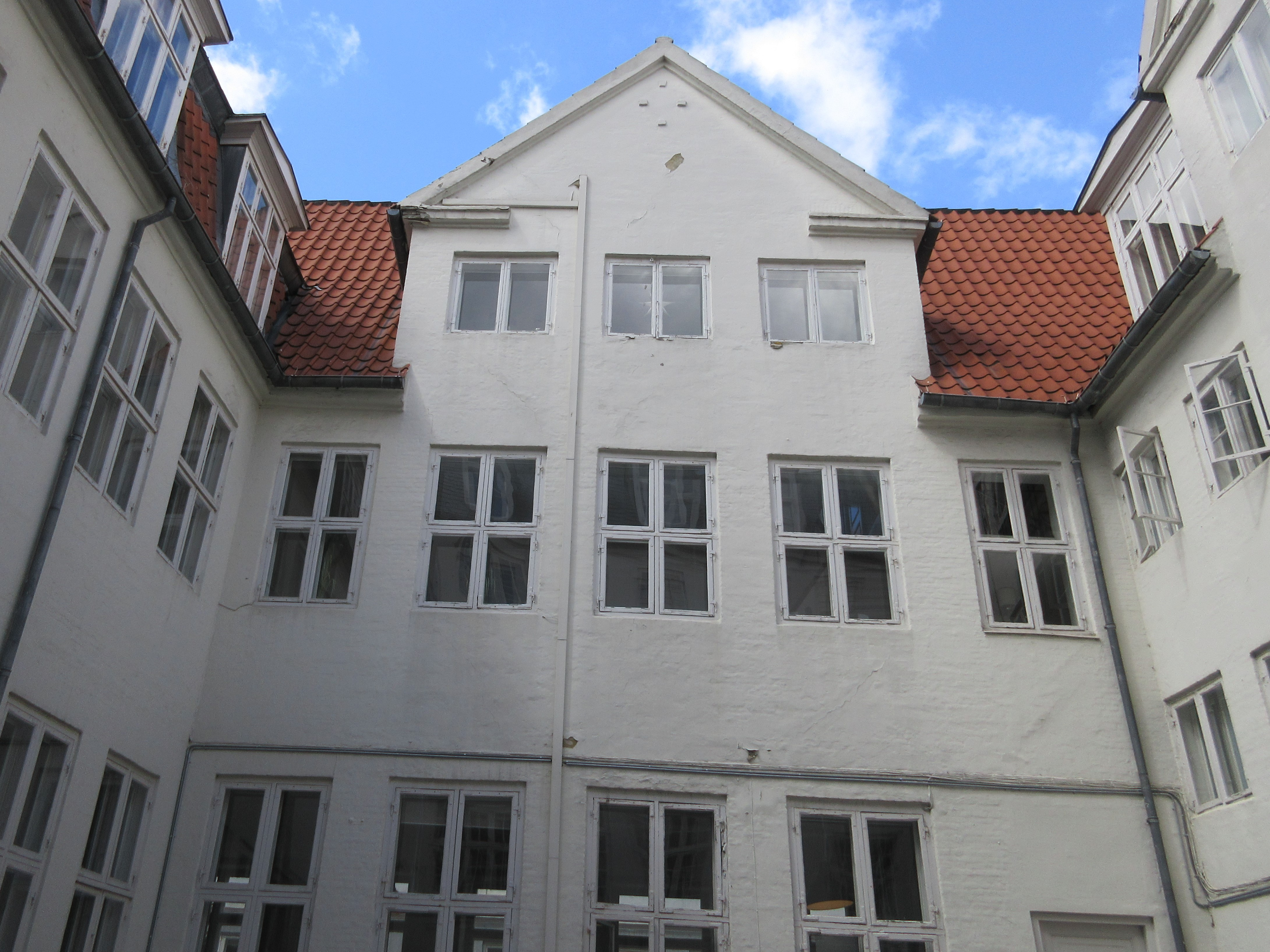
