= Spencerport High School =

Location
- 2707 Spencerport Road; Spencerport, New York; United States; 43.18579°N 77.78208°W

Information
- Type: Public high school
- Established: 1920
- School district: Spencerport Central School District
- Superintendent: Ty Zinkiewich
- Principal: Michael Bourne
- Staff: 110.97 (FTE)
- Grades: 9–12
- Enrollment: 1,142 (2022–23)
- Student to teacher ratio: 10.29
- Campus: Suburban
- Colors: Navy blue and gold
- Mascot: Ranger Bear
- Newspaper: The Voice
- Website: http://www.spencerportschools.org

Spencerport High School is the only high school in the Spencerport Central School District, located at 2707 Spencerport Road, in Spencerport, New York, United States. Led by Principal Michael Bourne, the school has over 1200 students and staff and offers a wide variety of courses from Photography to Sports and Entertainment Marketing.

The school is two stories high and has two gymnasiums, two cafeterias, and a pool. The new larger eight-lane pool with a diving area was built in 2008, and is currently finished. A weight room with brand new equipment and an extra practice room used for cheerleading, wrestling, and baseball is also available. In 2003 the school built an auditorium that seats one thousand people, and hosts multiple school and community events. Also recently built was an additional hallway for health, second language, technology, and the academy classes.

== Spencerport Academy ==
Spencerport Academy, the district's alternative high school, opened in September 2003, with 32 students. The Academy is located within Spencerport High School, in the recently built east wing.

The Academy serves 36 students in grades 9–12, and offers Regents-level courses. Students who graduate from the Academy are awarded a Spencerport Diploma, with the appropriate designation. The Academy is an integrated program that is open to students with or without an IEP.

The Academy is staffed by an administrator (Assistant Principal), full-time secretary, guidance counselor, social worker, and five teachers (English, Science, Social Studies, Math, and Special Ed.).

The Academy is a voluntary program for students who are at risk of dropping out or failing. Students must be referred to the program by the IST (Instructional Support Team) in conjunction with building administration. The student spends a day at the Academy, and is accepted or denied enrollment based on input from the student, parent, Academy staff and administration.

== Extracurricular activities ==
=== Clubs and activities ===
Spencerport offers a wide array of clubs and activities including:

- Art Club
- Business Honor Society
- Ranger Clubhouse
- Student Government
- Chess Club
- Class of 2019-2023
- Distributive Education Clubs Of America (DECA)
- Drama Club
- Drum Line
High School
- Environmental Club
- Fashion Club
- Film Club
- First Priority
- French Club
- French Honor Society
- Future Business Leaders Of America (FBLA)
- Gaming Club
- Gay Straight Alliance Club
- Health Club
- History Club
- Italian Club
- Jazz Band
- MasterMinds
- Math League
- Math Madness
- Military History Club
- Model United Nations
- Multicultural Club/Stepping
- National Honor Society
- Outdoors Club
- P.E. Leaders Club
- Peer Mediators
- Political Science Club
- Proud Rangers Inspire A Drug-Free Environment (PRIDE)
- Senior High Newspaper – THE VOICE
- Service Club
- Side Show Fan Club
- Spanish Club
- Spencerport Theatre Arts Group Experience (STAGE)
- Spencerport Underground Movement (RAGE)
- Students Against Destructive Decisions (SADD)
- Swimming
- Treble (Women’s) Choir
- Varsity Club
- Vocal Jazz
- Yearbook Club

=== Robotics ===
Spencerport is home to a competitive robotics team through FIRST Robotics Competition. Spencerport is represented by the team Ranger Robotics, indicated by the team number 3015, or the team name, Ranger Robotics. Ranger Robotics has won numerous awards and has attended the FIRST World Championship seven times since its inception in 2009, including reaching the final match in 2016.

=== Athletics ===
Spencerport offers 84 teams in 28 sports (including varsity, junior varsity, freshman and modified A and B programs). Teams and student-athletes have distinguished themselves with winning records and championships in Monroe County, Section V and New York State competitions. Many teams also have been recognized for their team grade point average, including two state champions, through the NYSPHSAA Team Scholar-Athlete program. Spencerport is best known for its wrestling team, which has won many county, sectional and NYS championships. Their varsity teams participate in the Spencerport Student Athletes Care program (a community service volunteer project). Varsity Spencerport student-athletes also have the opportunity to be members of the Varsity Club and P.R.I.D.E. (Proud Rangers Inspire a Drug-free Environment).

All candidates must sign up for each season in which they wish to participate. Approved interscholastic physicals are good for one calendar year. The student-athlete must also receive a seasonal health recertification from the school nurse in order to participate in a sport. Sports practice for fall, winter and spring sports start in August/September, November and March respectively.

Spencerport Athletics made headlines on February 16, 2006 for their basketball team which was defeated by the ESPY award-winning, Jason McElwain "J'Mac." Then-coach Josh Harter and his players received several national sportsmanship awards for not playing rough defense on him.

==== Wrestling ====
The Spencerport Ranger Logo

Spencerport High School has one of the most accomplished high school wrestling programs in the United States. The Rangers, as all Spencerport teams are known, are led by head coach Dan Glover, and their 56-year history includes coaches Leo Bernabi (41-11-1), Frank Meilnicki (36-2-1) and Walt Teike (161-26-2). William "Bill" Jacoutot began coaching at Spencerport with the 1981-82 season. His teams hold the state record for most consecutive tournament wins (16 teams or more) at 12. The Rangers have been Monroe County Divisional Champions 35 times (most recent 2008), Monroe County Tournament Champions 28 times (most recent 2008), Section V Champions 28 times (most recent 2008), and NYS Champions 8 times (most recent 2009). Spencerport is currently ranked 10th in the nation among public and private schools by W.I.N. magazine and has won a consecutive state title. Jacoutot has also coached ten individual New York State Champion wrestlers.

===== Individual New York State Champions =====
- 1974, 75 Frank DeAngelis*
- 1984 John Suhr
- 1986 Mike LoPresti
- 1986 Rick Suhr
- 1987 Tom Billone
- 1989 Joe LoPresti
- 1993 Sirrell Gissendanner*
- 1997 Jason DeBruin
- 1999 Shawn Hibbs
- 1999 Gary Borrelli
- 2008 Paul Glover
- 2008 Bryan Bourne

(*) Most Outstanding Wrestler

===== New York State Team Dual Meet Champions =====
1975, 1993, 2001, 2002, 2004, 2007, 2008, 2009

==== Swimming ====
The Spencerport Swim Team is the high school swim program for the high school in Spencerport, New York. The boys' program has existed since 1970, and the girls' program started in 1974. The teams compete in the Monroe County Athletic League, which is part of New York State Section V. The boys' team has a combined 348-135-1 dual-meet record as of the 2006-2007 season, while the girls' record is 172-257-3. The boys' team has won 12 Section V Class B titles (1972–1976 and 1992–1999). The boys have won the Monroe County Division titles 19 times (in 1976, 1979–1982, 1984–1986, 1992–1995, 1996–1999, 2001, 2010, and 2011). The girls swim team won the schools first ever Class B Section V title on November 4, 2023.

==== Ranger Hall of Fame ====
This is an award presented to one person each year who has been an outstanding athlete in the past. The winner's name is inscribed on a permanent plaque, and a picture is mounted and framed to hang in the Hall of Fame. The recipient is the guest of honor at the annual banquet. Selections are made from nominations made by the staff and past graduates of the school. An information sheet is kept on file in the athletic director's office. Each year the graduating class is screened for future award nominees and these are announced at the annual banquet. This award is paid for by the Student Union.

== Notable alumni ==
- Danielle Downey, professional golfer
- Terry Gurnett, Rochester women's soccer coach with a record-setting 400+ wins; member of the Alpha Delta Phi fraternity
- Brian Kamm, professional golfer
- John Franklin Kinney, judge
- Shane Prince, hockey player, drafted by Ottawa Senators in 2011
- Martin Sargent, television personality
- Rick Suhr, world-class pole vaulting coach
- Cathy Turner, short track speed skating Olympic gold medal winner in 1992 and 1994
- Tom Villard, actor
- Mabel Sine Wadsworth, birth control activist
- Alan Zemaitis, football cornerback for the Tampa Bay Buccaneers
