= Terry Gurnett =

American soccer coach

Current position
- Title: Head coach
- Team: University of Rochester
- Conference: NCAA Division III
- Record: 410–131–62

Biographical details
- Born: 1955 (age 70–71); Spencerport, NY, USA

Playing career
- 2 yrs: Rochester men's soccer
- Position: Goalie

Coaching career (HC unless noted)
- 1977–2010: Yellowjackets

Head coaching record
- Overall: 410–131–62
- Tournaments: 10 University Athletic; Association titles

Accomplishments and honors

Championships
- 1986, 1987

Awards
- Goergen Award

Records
- 400 wins

Terry Gurnett (born 1955) is an American who was head coach of women's soccer at the University of Rochester in Rochester, NY, in the United States. He is notable for having achieved a coaching record of 400 victories in September 2009. In the National Collegiate Athletic Association, he is the third coach in women's soccer to win over 400 games, and he is the first Division III coach to achieve this distinction. His team the Yellowjackets won two championships in 1986 and 1987, and ten University Athletic Association titles during his years of coaching. In 2009, he is coaching for his 32nd season. Gurnett stepped down from coaching in 2010 and was succeeded by his longtime assistant coach Thomas "Sike" Dardaganis.

== Career ==
Gurnett graduated from Spencerport High School where he played on two Sectional Championship teams. He attended Monroe Community College where he played on nationally ranked teams. He transferred to the University of Rochester where he started for two seasons. While at the university, he was a member of the Alpha Delta Phi fraternity. He graduated in 1977 with a degree in economics. Right after graduation, he became a coach for Rochester's women's soccer. Gurnett explained "I hadn't the foggiest notion of what I was doing––and some will say I still don't" in an interview in 2010. The team often plays at Rochester's Edwin Fauver Stadium which has 5,000 seats, fieldturf, lights, a press box, locker rooms, and a training room. While Gurnett was coaching, the Rochester women's soccer teams were consistently ranked in the "top 25" in national polls. The Yellowjackets won National Championships in 1986 and 1987. There were 33 consecutive years when the team had ten or more wins in the season. In the 1980s, he was honored as the "Division III women’s soccer coach of the decade for the 1980s." Gurnett was honored at the 24th Annual WHAM Sportswomen of the Year Awards in 2002. At the end of the 2008 soccer season, he had 397 wins. Gurnett has coached and worked at the University of Rochester while the office of the university's president has changed six times.

On September 14, 2009, Gurnett achieved his 400th win. At that point, his overall record was 400 wins, 127 losses, and 60 ties. In November 2009, his team is working towards a playoff spot. By September 2010, the record was 410 wins, 131 losses, and 62 ties totaling 603 games. Gurnett commented on changes he's witnessed during his lengthy career:

The biggest change has been in the respect given to female athletes and the way that female athletes are thought about. You don't even have to say female athletes. They're athletes, and they represent the very highest ideals. – Terry Gurnett, 2010.

Gurnett is the National Chair of the NSCAA All-America Committee, a member of the Division III Ranking Committee, and a member of the ECAC Women's Soccer Tournament Selection Committee. He is Rochester's Associate Director of Athletics for Advancement. He received the Goergen Award for Distinguished Contributions to undergraduate learning. He lives in Spencerport, New York.

== See also ==
- List of college women's soccer coaches with 300 wins
- University of Rochester
