= Suhr =

Suhr can refer to:

== People ==
- Suhr (surname), including a list of people with the name
- Johannes Nicolaus von Suhr (1792–1847), botanist with the standard author abbreviation "Suhr"

== Places ==
- Suhr, Aargau, a municipality of Switzerland
  - Suhr railway station

== Other ==
- Suhr Guitars, a California-based guitar manufacturer
- Suhr House, building in Copenhagen
- Society for Underwater Historical Research (SUHR), an amateur maritime archaeology organisation based in South Australia

== See also ==
- Suhre, a river of Switzerland, rising in Lake Sempach
