= 1916–17 Michigan State Normal Normalites men's basketball team =

American college basketball season

1916–17 Michigan State Normal Normalites men's basketball

Michigan Normal Co-Champions
- Conference: Independent
- Record: 17–1
- Head coach: Elmer D. Mitchell (2nd season)
- Home arena: Gymnasium

The 1916–17 team finished with a record of 17–1. It was the 2nd and last year for head coach Elmer D. Mitchell, who left to coach at the University of Michigan. The team captain was Ernest Rynearson. The team lost all of the previous season's starters to the Army. Along with Western Michigan, they were the Michigan Normal Co-Champions.

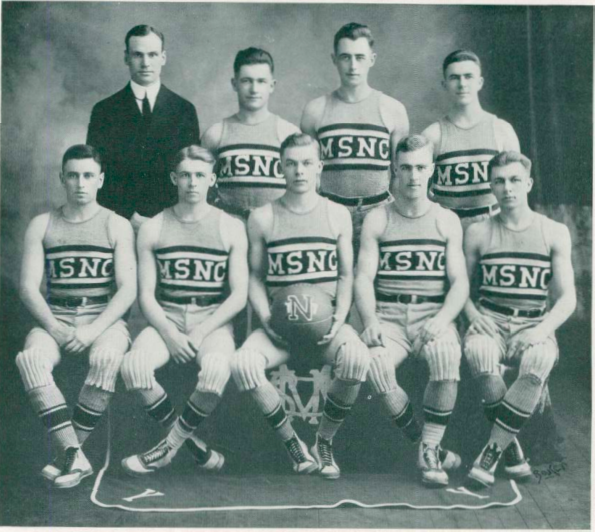
1916-17 EMU Basketball Team Picture

== Roster ==
Number	Name	Position	Class	Hometown/Previous School
	William Edwards	Guard	Junior	University of Michigan
	Ernest Rynearson	Forward		Ypsilanti, MI
	James W. Hole	Substitute	Senior	Mancelona, MI
	Donald D. Lawler	Guard	Senior	Brockport, NY
	William Dunn	Center	Senior	Spencerport, NY
	Howard Hutchinson	Substitute	Junior	Grand Rapids, MI
	Edward Powers	Substitute		
	Edwin W. Shadford	Forward		University of Michigan
	Harold R. Smith		Senior	Charlotte, MI

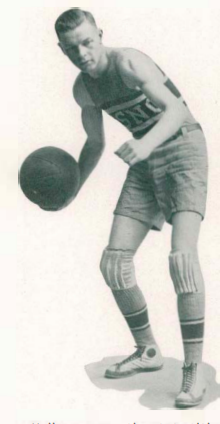
Rynearson EMU Basketball player

== Schedule ==
Date time, TV	Rank^{#}	Opponent^{#}	Result	Record	Site (attendance) city, state
Non-conference regular season
January 1917*		Ann Arbor YMCA	W 39-21	1-0	Gymnasium; Ypsilanti, MI
January 6, 1917*		Adrian College	W 33-17	2-0	Gymnasium; Ypsilanti, MI
January 11, 1917*		at Detroit AC	W 39-19	3-0	Detroit, MI
January 12, 1917*		Bowling Green	W 55-11	4-0	Gymnasium; Ypsilanti, MI
January 1917*		Assumption University	W 61-11	5-0	Gymnasium; Ypsilanti, MI
January 1917*		at Detroit College of Law	W 25-17	6-0	Detroit, MI
January 1917*		Michigan State Freshmen	W 28-20	7-0	Gymnasium; Ypsilanti, MI
January 27, 1917*		at Olivet College	W 37-14	8-0	Olivet, MI
February 2, 1917*		Hillsdale College	W 50-16	9-0	Gymnasium; Ypsilanti, MI
February 1917*		at Central Michigan	W 48-13	10-0	Gymnasium; Ypsilanti, MI
February 9, 1917*		at Central Michigan	W 41-11	11-0	Central Hall; Mount Pleasant, MI
February 10, 1917*		at Alma College	W 46-32	12-0	Alma, MI
February 15, 1917*		Detroit College of Law	W 61-15	13-0	Gymnasium; Ypsilanti, MI
February 16, 1917*		at Grand Rapids YMCA	L 23-37	13-1	Grand Rapids, MI
February 23, 1917*		at Adrian College	W 37-25	14-1	Adrian, MI
February 28, 1917*		Grand Rapids YMCA	W 25-13	15-1	Gymnasium; Ypsilanti, MI
February 23, 1917*		Alma College	W 47-16	16-1	Gymnasium; Ypsilanti, MI
1917*		at Assumption University	W 33-22	17-1	Windsor, Ontario
*Non-conference game. ^{#}Rankings from AP Poll. (#) Tournament seedings in parentheses. All times are in Eastern Time.

== Game Notes ==
=== 1st Windsor Assumption Game ===
Aurora has a score of 61-10.

=== January 27, 1917 ===
Aurora has a score of 39-13.
