= Mary Saxer =

American pole vaulter (born 1987)

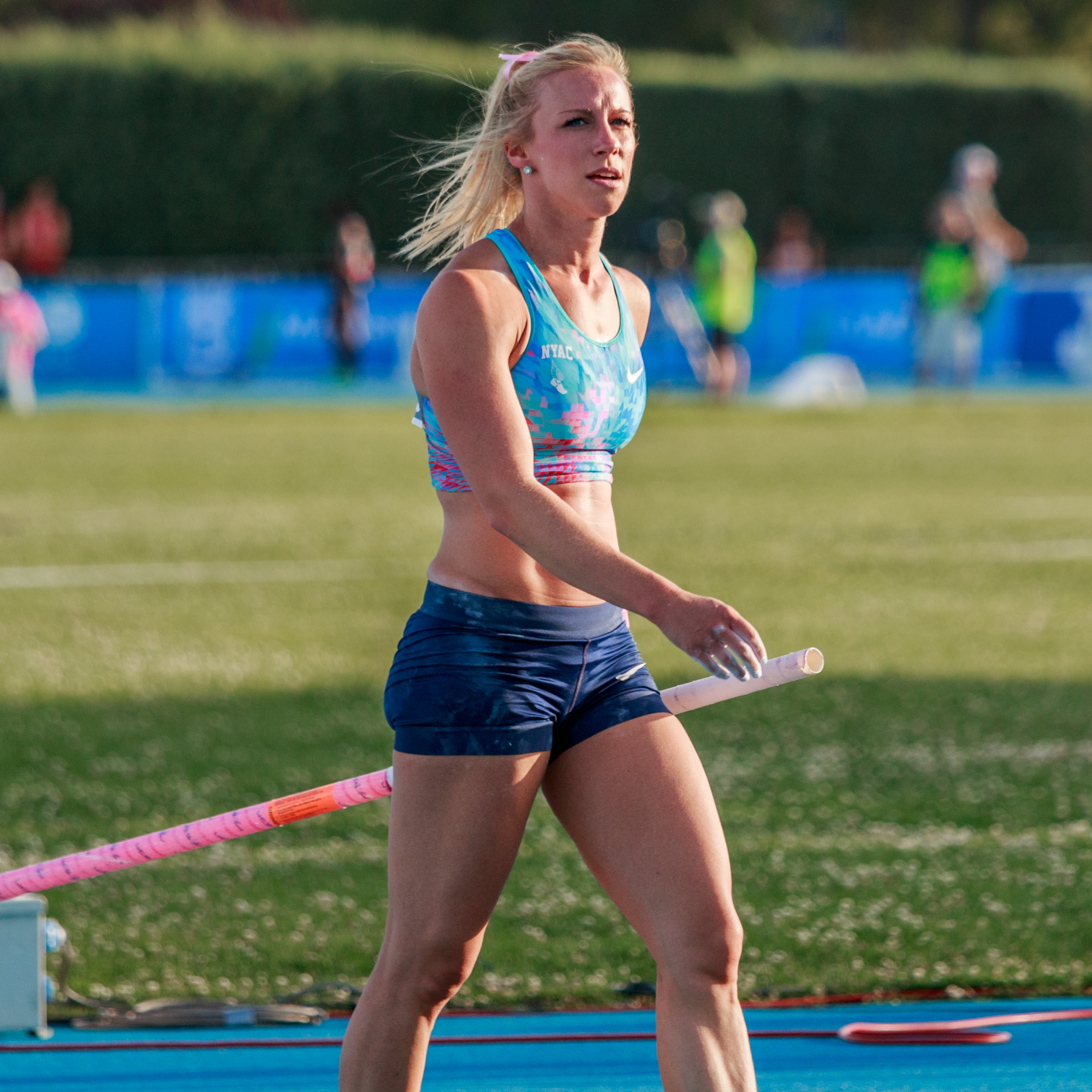
Mary Saxer

Mary Saxer (born June 21, 1987) is an American track and field athlete who competes in the pole vault. She holds a personal record of 4.71 m (15 ft 5 1/4 in) for the event, set in 2014.

Saxer excelled in her youth, breaking the North, Central American and Caribbean junior record for the event with 4.32 m (14 ft 2 in) in 2005 as a high school student. She did not improve on this mark while competing collegiately for the University of Notre Dame, although she did win three Big East Conference titles and was third at the 2009 NCAA Women's Outdoor Track and Field Championship. She finally bettered her mark at the 2010 USA Outdoor Track and Field Championships, where she was third in her first national podium finish.

She was the 2012 national runner-up indoors and represented her country at the 2012 IAAF World Indoor Championships. Saxer won the 2014 USA Indoor title and made her second international appearance at the 2014 IAAF World Indoor Championships.

== Biography ==
=== Early life and college ===
Born in Buffalo, New York to Ann and Don Saxer, she grew up in Lancaster, New York and attended Lancaster High School. Saxer was involved in gymnastics from a young age but gave up the sport around the age of twelve. She remained interested in sports, however, and became interested in track and field athletics, first sprint and then long jumping. She was a four-time state schools champion in the long jump. However, it was in the pole vault that she truly excelled in her youth. Rick Suhr, a New York-based vaulting coach, spotted Saxer at a long jump training camp in summer 2003 and encouraged her to try out the new event.

Working with Suhr and her high school coach, Kevin Carriero, Saxer swiftly established herself among the best young vaulters in the world. (Women's pole vault was still in an early stage as it only became an Olympic event in 2000.) In her first year of competition in 2004 she placed runner-up at the indoor high schools championships with a clearance of 3.79 m (12 ft 5 in). The following year she cleared four metres for the first time and won at the National Scholastic Indoor Championships. A height of 4.32 m (14 ft 2 in) at the Nike Indoor Nationals brought her a continental junior record (under-20) and made her the first American high school athlete to clear fourteen feet. She competed against fully fledged professionals at the Millrose Games soon after and managed sixth place. She was named 2005 National High School Indoor Athlete of the Year and also managed to gain two letters for the high school field hockey team at the same time. Her high school success came at the same time as her coach, Carriero, was undergoing treatment for cancer – a condition that went into remission in Saxer's last year for the school team.

Saxer gained an athletic scholarship to attend the University of Notre Dame in 2005 and chose to study marketing in the Mendoza College of Business. By February the following year she had already broken the school record with a vault of 4.05 m (13 ft 3 1/4 in). She was runner-up at the Big East Conference indoor championship and also managed ninth in the long jump. Outdoors she won at the Mt. SAC Relays and placed fourth in the Big East pole vault. Her performances stagnated in the 2007 season, as she failed to get over the four-meter mark that year. She repeated as the Big East runner-up indoors, but was out of the top three at the outdoor Big East meet. She had similar placings in the vault and long jump at the 2008 Big East Indoors, coming ninth and tenth in the events, including a long jump lifetime best indoors of 5.73 m (18 ft 9 1/2 in). She won at the Mt. SAC Relays for a second time and claimed her first conference title at the Big East outdoor championship, where she was also in the top ten in long jump. Her best mark that year in the vault was 4.06 m (13 ft 3 3/4 in). Her best college performances came in the 2009 season. She began with a Big East indoor win with a height of 4.20 m (13 ft 9 1/4 in) and then placed ninth at the NCAA Women's Indoor Track and Field Championship. She defended her Big East outdoor title with a vault of 4.20 m (13 ft 9 1/4 in) before setting an outright best of 4.30 m (14 ft 1 1/4 in) to place third at the NCAA Women's Outdoor Track and Field Championship. She also entered the 2009 USA Outdoor Track and Field Championships, but did not record a valid mark.

=== Professional ===
After graduating from Notre Dame in 2009, she began to compete nationally, training under her coach Danny Wilkerson. She reached her first national podium at the 2010 USA Outdoor Track and Field Championships, vaulting a personal record of 4.50 m (14 ft 9 in). She competed abroad for the first time in 2011. She improved her indoor best to 4.40 m (14 ft 5 in) at Pole Vault Stars in Donetsk and was in the top three at both the Colorful Daegu Championships Meeting and Shanghai Diamond League meets. Later that year she also won at the Spitzen Leichtathletik Luzern and was second at the Meeting Sport Solidarieta. Her best performances came on American soil, however, as she set an indoor record of 4.50 m (14 ft 9 in) in Des Moines, Iowa and 4.60 m (15 ft 1 in) in Seattle. She was sixth at the USA indoor championship and placed fifth at the USA Outdoors.

A runner-up finish at the 2012 USA indoors with a personal record of 4.62 m (15 ft 1 3/4 in) brought her a place at the 2012 IAAF World Indoor Championships, her first international selection. At that competition she cleared the opening height of 4.30 m (14 ft 1 1/4 in) but got no further. Saxer missed the opportunity to compete at the 2012 London Olympics when she finished fourth on count-back at the 2012 United States Olympic Trials behind Lacy Janson. She struggled on the international circuit that year, failing to record a height at two meets in Brazil and coming out of the top six at the Shanghai, Doha and Birmingham Diamond League events.

She was more consistent in 2013, starting with a number of top three finishes indoors at the Boston Indoor Games, Pedro's Cup, Millrose Games, and then a height of 4.60 m (15 ft 1 in) to place third at the 2013 USA Indoor Championships. In the outdoor season she equalled her best to take second at the Shanghai Diamond League and cleared a new best of 4.70 m (15 ft 5 in) in Chula Vista. At the 2013 USA Outdoor Track and Field Championships she was again out of the medals, finishing in the fourth for the second year running. She competed on the European track circuit for the rest of the year, with a meeting record at the KBC Night of Athletics and a second place at the Palio Citta della Quercia meet being the highlights.

Saxer won her first national title in the pole vault at the beginning of 2014, defeating Jenn Suhr (the wife and student of her former coach Rick Suhr) and improving her best to 4.71 m (15 ft 5 1/4 in) in the process. At the 2014 USA Outdoor Track and Field Championships missed at 4.45 m (14 ft 7 in) and 2015 USA Outdoor Track and Field Championships missed at 4.40 m (14 ft 5 in). Saxer cleared 4.65 m (15 ft 3 in) at 2016 USA Indoor Track and Field Championships to place 5th. Saxer made the final clearing 4.40 m (14 ft 5 in) in 2016 United States Olympic Trials (track and field), but nh in the final.

== Personal records ==
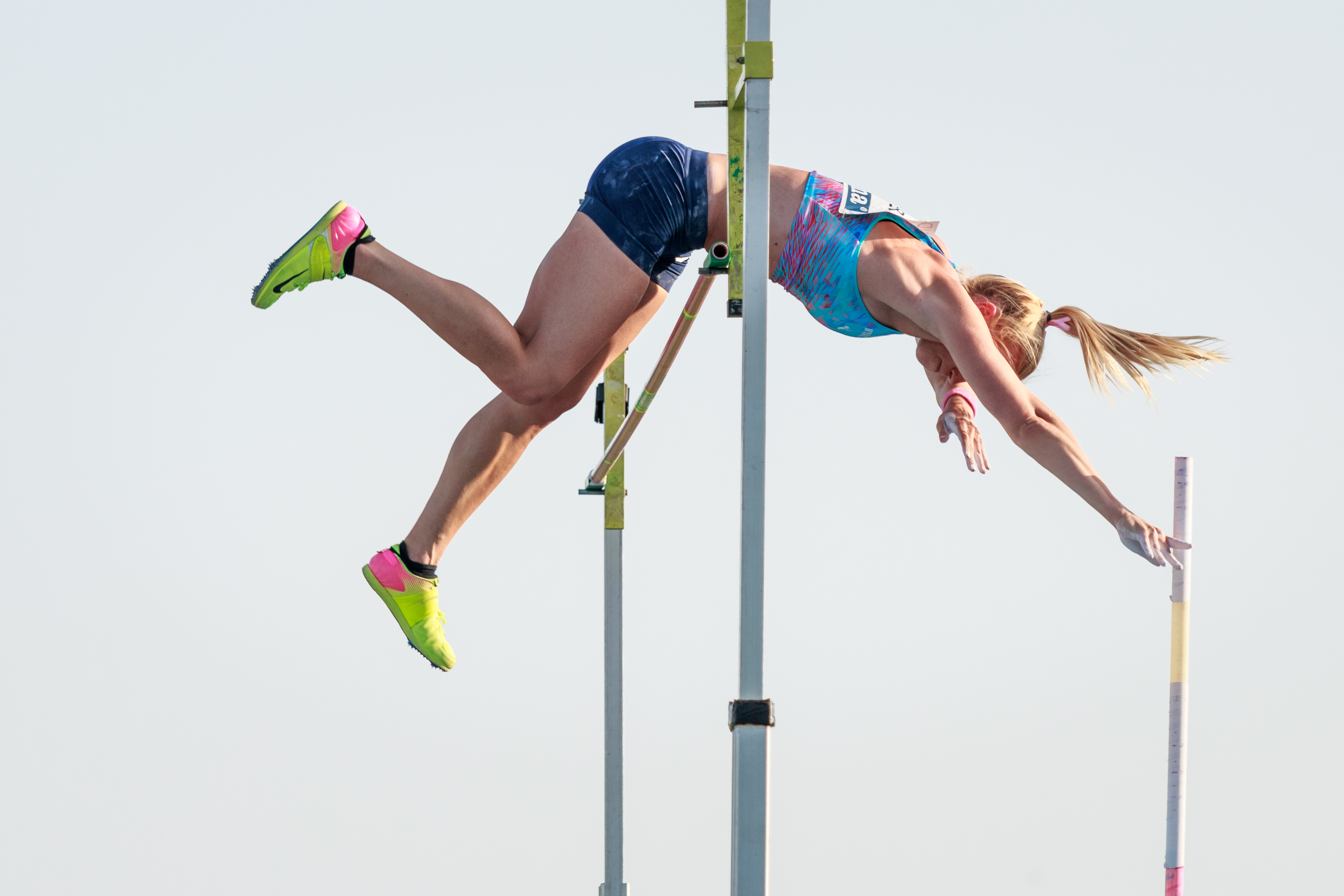
Mary Saxer at the IAAF World Challenge Meeting Madrid 2017.

Outdoors

- Pole vault – 4.70 m (15 ft 5 in) (2013)
- Long jump – 5.93 m (19 ft 5 1/4 in) (2004)

Indoors

- Pole vault – 4.71 m (15 ft 5 1/4 in) (2014)
- Long jump – 5.73 m (18 ft 9 1/2 in) (2008)

== Competition record ==
Year	Competition	Venue	Position	Event	Notes
2012	World Indoor Championships	Istanbul, Turkey	14th	Pole vault	4.55 m
2014	World Indoor Championships	Sopot, Poland	8th	Pole vault	4.55 m

National titles

- USA Indoor Track and Field Championships: 2014
