= Spencerport Central School District =

School district in New York, United States

Coordinates: 43.1879°N 77.7912°W

Address
- 71 Lyell Avenue Spencerport, New York, 14559; United States

District information
- Type: Public
- Grades: PreK–12
- NCES District ID: 3627780

Students and staff
- Students: 3,609 (2020–2021)
- Teachers: 349.12 (on an FTE basis)
- Staff: 395.5 (on an FTE basis)
- Student–teacher ratio: 10.34:1

Other information
- Website: www.spencerportschools.org

The Spencerport Central School District is a public school district in western New York State that serves approximately 3500 students in the village of Spencerport, town of Ogden and portions of the towns of Gates, Greece and Parma in Monroe County, with over 800 employees and an operating budget of $60 million (~$14,277 per student).

The average class size is 20 (elementary), 25 (middle-high school) students and the student-teacher ratio is 13:1 (elementary), 12:1 (middle-high school).

Ty Zinkiewich is the Superintendent of Schools.

== History ==
Originally, the school district consisted of a building on West Avenue near South Union, cost $8,000, and served 130 students with three teachers. Many one-room schoolhouses also existed around the area but was not in relation to the school district.

In 1926, the Trowbridge School on Lyell Avenue in the village was constructed and served grades K to 12. It replaced the West Avenue school. Trowbridge was added in the 1930s. A Spencerport science teacher, Ellsworth J. Wilson, also known as "Tiny," became the district principal (superintendent) in 1946, a position he held until his retirement in 1971. Undoubtedly, he exercised educational leadership with consummate skill and led the destinies of education in the Spencerport community. In 1949, area residents voted to consolidate many area schools with the Spencerport School. Mr. Wilson guided the centralization of 13 schools in Ogden, Parma, Greece, and Gates, many of them one-room schoolhouses, into one district in 1951. The following year, a two-story elementary school was built adjacent to the Trowbridge Building. Four years later, a one-story addition was put on this building.

The Spencerport Intermediate School was built in 1957 and was renamed in memory of Leo A. Bernabi after his death in 1974. Mr. Bernabi, with the district from 1949 to 1974, was a teacher, principal, assistant district supervisor, and superintendent. Leo Bernabi was a charter member of the Wrestling Officials Association of Section V. In fact the very first meeting of the organization, then known as the Wrestling Coaches and Officials Association of Section V, was held at his home in Spencerport, NY in December 1956. Leo established and was the first coach of the Spencerport Rangers wrestling program. He guided them to a 41-11-1 in his seven-year stint between 1949-1957. He went on to become the Superintendent of Schools in Spencerport and today an elementary school, in the district, bears his name. He continued as an outstanding official and administrator in both the high school and college ranks. His contributions in establishing a referee training and development program were instrumental in helping Section V officials become some of the finest in NY State wrestling. Leo was the first Section V official to be elected President of the NY State Wrestling Officials Association. Under his leadership, he transformed that organization from one that was lea by just a few to one of inclusivity. He laid the groundwork for its presidency to rotate with representatives from the various sections throughout the state. He is a member of the Section V and NY State Wrestling Halls of Fame An addition to this school was built in 1961.

Four more school buildings were built in the 1960's as the population soared in the Spencerport area. In 1961, the building, now known as the Cosgrove Middle School, was built. In 1964, an elementary school, now known as the William. C. Munn School, on Manitou Road was constructed. Three years later, the Townline Elementary School was built on Townline Road near Union Street. This school was rededicated in 1994 as the Terry A. Taylor Elementary School in honor of one of the school's teachers. In 1969, another building was erected that is now the high school. In the late 1970's, the elementary school next to Trowbridge was converted into the district offices, housing many of the administrative departments and support groups. In 1984, the Trowbridge building, which at the time housed only the 9th grade for the district, was closed because it was economically unfeasible to renovate for modern classrooms.

Due to increasing enrollment and the need for classroom space, the district took on a number of addition/renovation projects. What is now the Cosgrove Middle School was added on to in 1986 and 1992. Both Bernabi and Munn elementary schools were added onto in 1990. A major addition to the current high school that doubled its space was built in 1992. A 21 classroom addition and cafeteria were added to the Taylor Elementary School in 1997. Later that year, construction was completed on a bus garage and parking facility. In 2003, Canal View Elementary was opened.

== Board of education ==
The Board of Education (BOE) consists of 8 members who serve rotating 3-year terms. Elections are held each May for board members and to vote on the School District Budget.

Current board members are:

- Matthew Sutter - President
- MaryChase Garrison - Vice President
- Gary Bracken
- Braxton Webb
- Christopher McMann
- David Gibbardo Marco Cancellieri

== Schools & Offices ==
=== Bernabi Elementary school ===
- Bernabi Elementary School (K-5), Principal - David Caiazza
- Named after Leo Bernabi

=== Canal View Elementary School ===
- Canal View Elementary (K-5), Principal - Carol Robinson

=== Munn Elementary School ===
- Munn Elementary School (K-5), Principal - Michael M. Canny

=== Taylor Elementary School ===
- Taylor Elementary School (K-5), Principal - Telcie Pincelli
- Named after Terry A. Taylor
- Former name: Town Line School

=== Cosgrove Middle school ===
Cosgrove Middle School, named after Ada Cosgrove, is the only public middle school in the district.

=== Wilson High school ===
- Spencerport High School (9-12), Principal - Mike Bourne, Assistant Principals - Natalie Kirisits (9th grade), Tyler Torres (10th grade), Jess Silsby (11th grade & Spencerport Academy) and Ingel Schmidt (12th grade)

=== Administration ===
- The administration building serves as the SCSD main coordinating and supervising office. It includes the HR Dept., Technology Assistance Dept., the superintendent's office, etc. (originally the district’s elementary school)

=== Transportation ===
The Spencerport Schools transportation department is in charge of getting students to and from home, school, field trips and sports.

== See also ==
- Spencerport High School
