= Spencerport, New York =

- Village
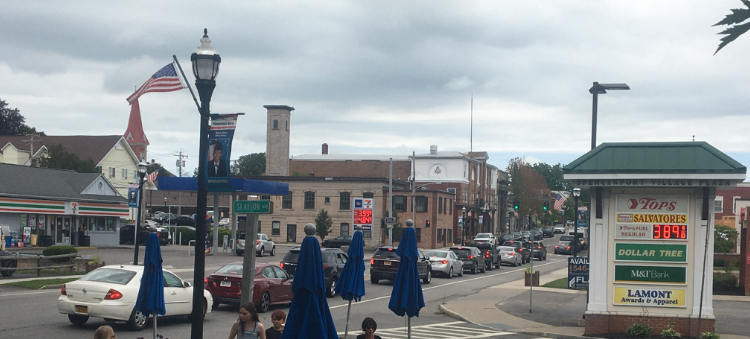
- Downtown Spencerport in August 2023

- Location in Monroe County and the state of New York

- Location of New York in the United States
- Coordinates: 43°11′22″N 77°48′15″W
- Country: United States
- State: New York
- County: Monroe
- Town: Ogden
- Incorporated: 1867

Government
  - Mayor: Gary Penders (Note: Penders has advertised both as a Progressive and a Village First candidate in the past) (2023)

Area
  - Total: 1.41 sq mi (3.66 km^{2})
  - Land: 1.38 sq mi (3.58 km^{2})
  - Water: 0.031 sq mi (0.08 km^{2})
- Elevation: 550 ft (170 m)

Population (2020)
  - Total: 3,685
  - Density: 2,666.0/sq mi (1,029.33/km^{2})
- Time zone: UTC-5 (EST)
  - Summer (DST): UTC-4 (EDT)
- ZIP Code: 14559
- Area code: 585
- FIPS code: 36-70189
- Website: spencerport.gov

Spencerport is a village in Monroe County, New York, United States, and a suburb of Rochester. The population was 3,685 at the 2020 census. The village is within the town of Ogden, along the Erie Canal.

== History ==
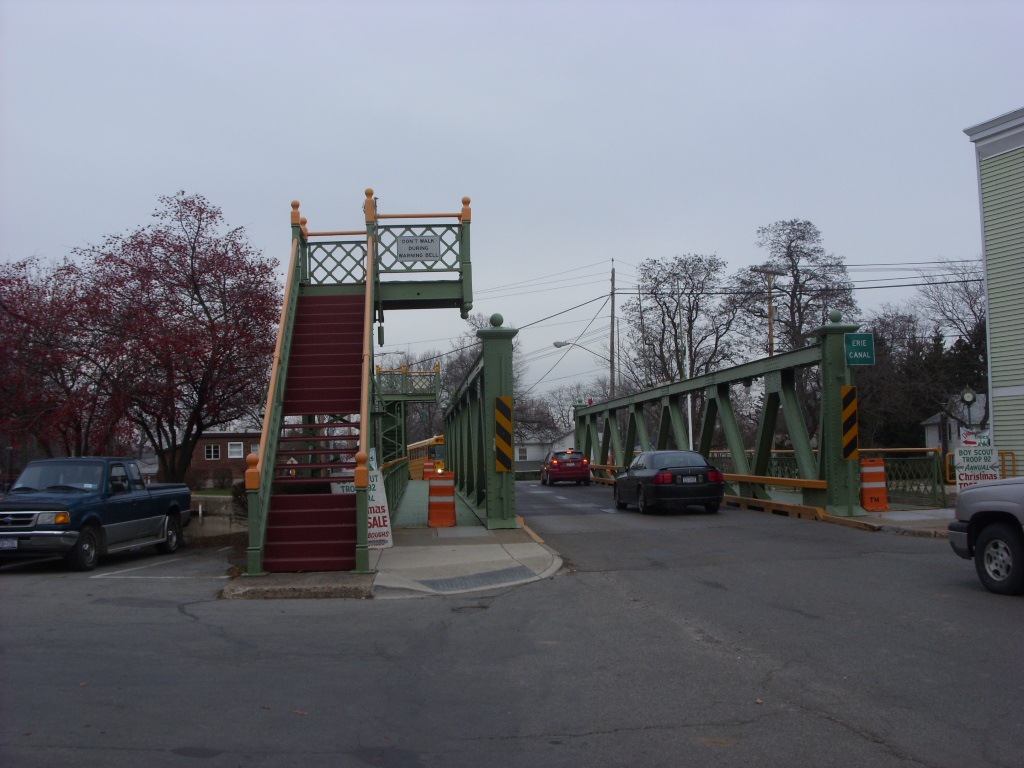
Erie Canal bridge in Spencerport

In 1804, Daniel Spencer bought a farm about 1 1/2 miles (2.4 km) north of Ogden Center. When the Erie Canal opened, the farm, through which the canal passed at the Canawaugus Road, was sold to become the first village lots. As a port on the canal, the area was called "Spencer's Basin" and later changed to Spencerport.

On April 22, 1867, the New York State Legislature incorporated Spencerport as a village, and William Slayton was elected as its first mayor.

The Spencerport Methodist Church was listed on the National Register of Historic Places in 2008.

== Geography ==
Spencerport is located in western Monroe County at 43°11′22″N 77°48′15″W (43.189312, -77.804132), within the northern part of the town of Ogden. New York State Route 31 passes through the south side of the village as Nichols Street, leading east 10 miles (16 km) to the center of Rochester and west 8 miles (13 km) to the Brockport area. State Route 531, the Spencerport Expressway, passes just south of the village, ending 2 miles (3 km) to the west at Route 31 and leading east 5 miles (8 km) to Interstate 490 in the town of Gates outside of Rochester. State Route 259 passes through the center of Spencerport as Union Street, leading north 7 miles (11 km) to Hilton and south 4.5 miles (7.2 km) to North Chili.

According to the U.S. Census Bureau, the village of Spencerport has a total area of 1.4 square miles (3.6 km^{2}), of which 0.03 square miles (0.08 km^{2}), or 2.26%, are water.

Spencerport Airpark (D91) is a grass-strip general aviation airport south of the village.

== Demographics ==
Historical population
Census	Pop.	Note	%±
1870	591		—
1880	670		13.4%
1890	695		3.7%
1900	715		2.9%
1910	1,000		39.9%
1920	926		−7.4%
1930	1,249		34.9%
1940	1,340		7.3%
1950	1,595		19.0%
1960	2,461		54.3%
1970	2,929		19.0%
1980	3,424		16.9%
1990	3,606		5.3%
2000	3,559		−1.3%
2010	3,601		1.2%
2020	3,685		2.3%
U.S. Decennial Census

=== 2020 census ===
As of the 2020 census, Spencerport had a population of 3,685. The median age was 42.6 years. 20.4% of residents were under the age of 18 and 19.4% of residents were 65 years of age or older. For every 100 females there were 93.2 males, and for every 100 females age 18 and over there were 88.1 males age 18 and over.

99.6% of residents lived in urban areas, while 0.4% lived in rural areas.

There were 1,582 households in Spencerport, of which 28.4% had children under the age of 18 living in them. Of all households, 46.1% were married-couple households, 15.7% were households with a male householder and no spouse or partner present, and 29.2% were households with a female householder and no spouse or partner present. About 28.8% of all households were made up of individuals and 11.5% had someone living alone who was 65 years of age or older.

There were 1,621 housing units, of which 2.4% were vacant. The homeowner vacancy rate was 0.9% and the rental vacancy rate was 2.7%.

Racial composition as of the 2020 census
Race	Number	Percent
White	3,296	89.4%
Black or African American	71	1.9%
American Indian and Alaska Native	6	0.2%
Asian	28	0.8%
Native Hawaiian and Other Pacific Islander	2	0.1%
Some other race	54	1.5%
Two or more races	228	6.2%
Hispanic or Latino (of any race)	188	5.1%

=== 2000 census ===
As of the 2000 census, there were 3,559 people, 1,413 households, and 1,001 families residing in the village. The population density was 2,609.7 inhabitants per square mile (1,007.6/km^{2}). There were 1,453 housing units at an average density of 1,065.4 per square mile (411.4/km^{2}). The racial makeup of the village was 97.53% White, 0.56% African American, 0.31% Native American, 0.51% Asian, 0.25% from other races, and 0.84% from two or more races. Hispanic or Latino of any race were 1.88% of the population.

There were 1,413 households, out of which 33.7% had children under the age of 18 living with them, 57.0% were married couples living together, 11.2% had a female householder with no husband present, and 29.1% were non-families. 24.1% of all households were made up of individuals, and 8.4% had someone living alone who was 65 years of age or older. The average household size was 2.49 and the average family size was 2.97.

In the village, the population was spread out, with 24.4% under the age of 18, 8.1% from 18 to 24, 28.5% from 25 to 44, 26.0% from 45 to 64, and 13.0% who were 65 years of age or older. The median age was 38 years. For every 100 females, there were 91.3 males. For every 100 females age 18 and over, there were 86.9 males.

The median income for a household in the village was $56,850, and the median income for a family was $62,326. Males had a median income of $44,167 versus $29,722 for females. The per capita income for the village was $24,515. About 0.8% of families and 1.5% of the population were below the poverty line, including none of those under age 18 and 5.6% of those age 65 or over.

=== Demographic estimates ===
As of 2024, there is an estimated population of 3,632 people. There are an estimated 1,574 households, with 879 being married and 495 being nonfamily. The average family size is 2.75 and the average household size is 2.31.

The median income for a household in 2024 is $77,500, and the median income for a family is $97,153. The average income for males is $62,791 versus $51,471 for females. The overall poverty rate is at 5.42%.

== Sites of interest ==
- Erie Canal
- Pineway Ponds Park - home to a large playground and multi-use recreation facility
- Springdale Farm - an agricultural education facility open to the public, serves as a day program site for adults with developmental disabilities
- Colby-Pulver House Museum
- Spencerport Depot and Canal Museum- a local history museum and visitors center, located in a restored, former RLBRR trolley station

== Notable people ==
- Danielle Downey, LPGA golfer; went to school in Spencerport
- Shane Prince, professional ice hockey player
- Rick Suhr, Olympic pole vault coach in 2008 and 2012
- Maynard Troyer, NASCAR driver: 1971, 1973
- Tom Villard (1953 – 1994), actor known for his leading role in the 1980s series We Got It Made as well as roles in several feature films
- Alan Zemaitis, NFL cornerback; went to school in Spencerport

== See also ==
- Spencerport Central School District
- Spencerport High School
