= Spencerport Methodist Church =

Historic church in New York, United States

- U.S. National Register of Historic Places
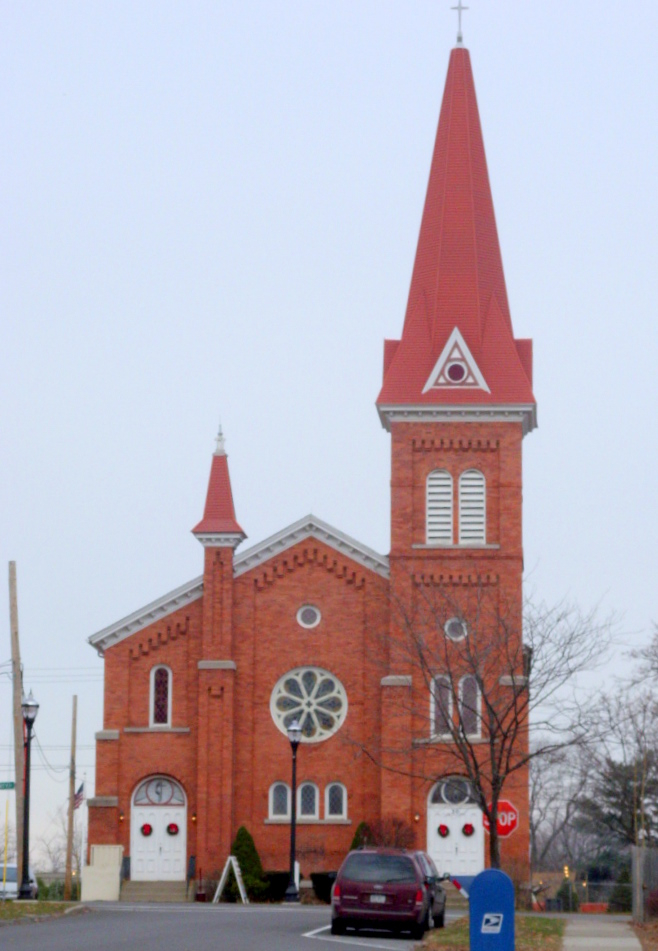
- Spencerport Methodist Church, December 2008

- Location within New York Location within the United States
- Location: 32 Amity St., Spencerport, New York
- Coordinates: 43°11′27″N 77°48′07″W
- Area: 0.4 acres (0.16 ha)
- Built: 1870-1871
- Architectural style: Romanesque
- NRHP reference No.: 08000274
- Added to NRHP: April 11, 2008

Spencerport Methodist Church, also known as Spencerport United Methodist Church, is a historic Methodist church located at Spencerport in Monroe County, New York, United States. It is a Romanesque style, three- by seven-bay church building constructed of brick on a foundation of Medina sandstone. Initially constructed in 1870–1871, the interior was updated in 1909 to the Akron Plan precepts for church design.

It was listed on the National Register of Historic Places in 2008.
