= Merløsegaard =

- Interactive map of the Merløsegaard area

General information
- Location: Stibjærgvej 34; 4370 Store Merløse, Denmark
- Coordinates: 55°32′4″N 11°42′4″E
- Completed: 1928

Merløsegaard is a manor house located 9 kilometres north of Ringsted, close to the village of Store Merløse, Holbæk Municipality, some sixty kilometres southwest of Copenhagen, Denmark. Merløsegaard and nearby Bonderup are owned by Den Suhrske Stiftelse. The buildings are now operated as a hotel and event venue.

== History ==
=== Early history ===
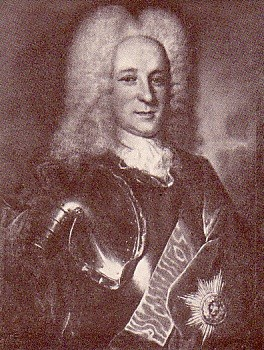
Ferdinand Anton Danneskiold-Laurvig

The estate was established as a manor in 1678 by colonel Lauritz Munk. Merløsegaard was later sold to assessor Eiler Jacobsen Eilert, the owner of neighboring Bonderup. He had previously also been the owner of Tårnborg at Korsør from 1692 to 1699..

In 1719, Eilert sold Merløsegaard to Poul Sadolin. After just four years, he sold the estate to district judge Johannes Christiansen who soon thereafter sold it to Johannes Winckler. He was already leasing Skjoldenæsholm.

In 1727, Merløsegaard was acquired by count Ferdinand Anton Danneskiold-Laurvig. Merløsegaard was after his death in 1754 passed on to his son Frederik Ludvig Danneskiold-Laurvig.

=== Neergaard family ===
In 1763, Danneskiold-Laurvig's heirs sold the estate to War Councillor Peter Johansen Neergaard. He was succeeded on the estate by his youngest son Johan Thomas de Neergaard. His son, Peter Johansen Neergaard, passed it on to his nephew, Tønnes Christian Bruun de Neergaard.

=== Moltke and Knuth ===
In 1906, Merløsegaard was sold to Frederik Knuth. He soon thereafter sold the estate to Count Adam Wilhelm Moltke of Bregentved. He served as the first Prime Minister of Denmark in the new constitutional monarchy from 1848 to 1852.

=== Suhr family ===
Johannes Theodorus Suhr, a wealthy merchant from Copenhagen, purchased the estate in 1858. Suhr ceded Merløsegaard and Bonderup to a new family trust, Den Sturhske Stiftels.

== Architecture ==
The current main building was constructed after a fire in 1928. It is a one-storey, white-washed building with a half-hipped mansard roof clad with red tile. It is set in a park with 300-year old oak trees, mirror pond and rose garden.

== Today ==
Merløsegaard and Bonderup are still owned by Den Suhrske Stiftelse. The two estates have a combined area of 1,310 hectares. Merløsegaard's main building is operated as a seven-room hotel and event venue by a tenant. The hotel is a member of Small Danish Hotels.

== List of owners ==
- (1678- ) Lauritz Munk
- ( -1719) Eiler Jacobsen Eilert
- (1719-1723) Poul Sadolin
- (1723) Johannes Christensen
- (1723-1727) Johannes Winckler
- (1727-1754) Ferdinand Anton Danneskiold-Laurvig
- (1754-1763) Frederik Ludvig Danneskiold-Laurvig
- (1763-1772) Peter Johansen Neergaard
- (1772-1795) Johan Thomas Petersen de Neergaard
- (1795-1796) Peter Johansen Neegaard
- (1797-1807) Tønnes Christian Bruun de Neergaard
- (1807- ) Frederik Knuth
- ( -1858) Adam Wilhelm Moltke
- (1858) Johannes Theodorus Suhr
- (1858- ) Den Suhrske Stiftelse
