= Small Danish Hotels =

- Formerly: Sammenslutningen Dansk Kroferie; Danish Inns & Hotels
- Company type: Marketing cooperative
- Industry: Hospitality
- Founded: 1981
- Headquarters: Horsens, Denmark
- Area served: Denmark
- Key people: Jørgen Christensen (CEO)
- Website: www.smalldanishhotels.dk

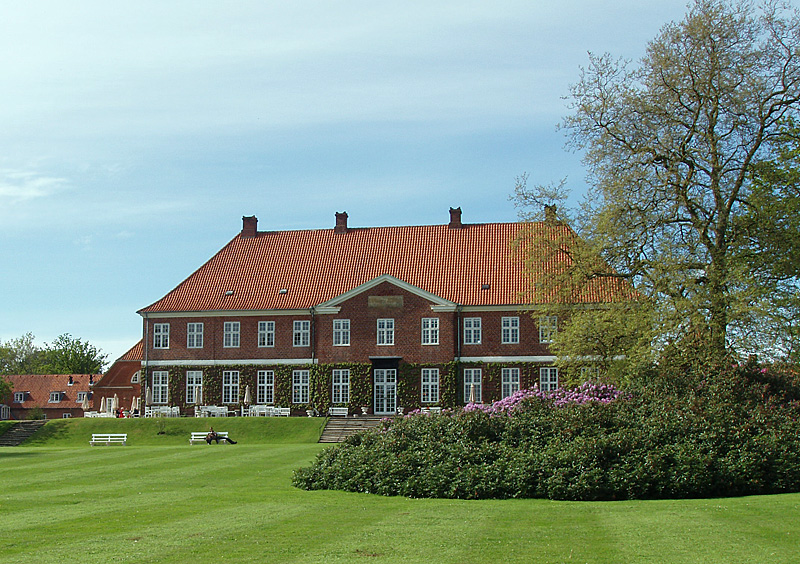
Hindsgavl

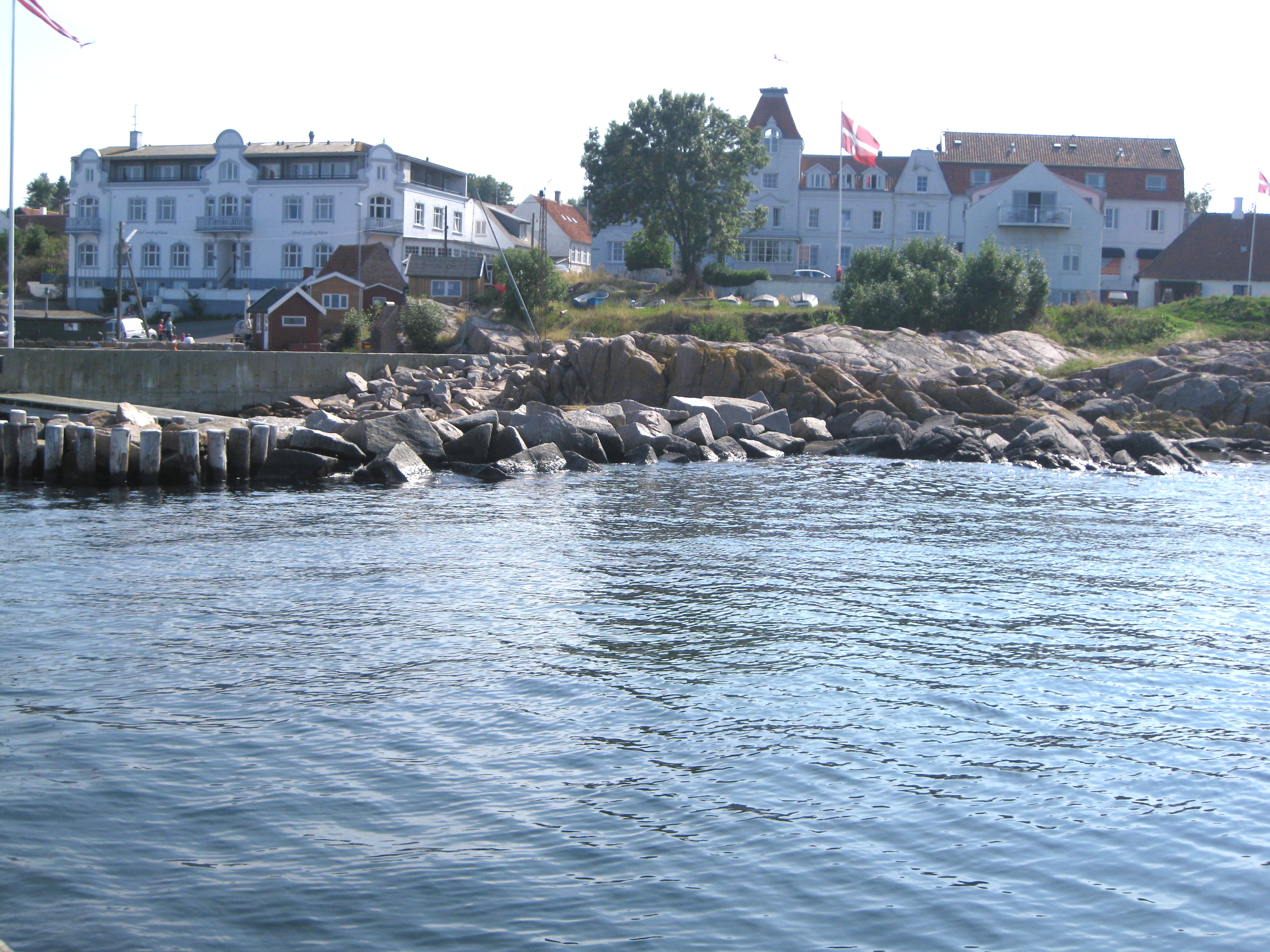
Sandvig

Small Danish Hotels is the largest hotel chain in Denmark, consisting of approximately 80 privately owned inns, hotels, castles and manor houses scattered throughout Denmark. The chain is a member of the Global Alliance of Private Hotels.

== History ==
Roadside inns (Danish: kro) have been an integral part of the Danish countryside for centuries. The oldest kro still in operation is Bromølle Kro near lake Tissø on western Zealand, from 1198. In 1396, Queen Margrethe I decreed that the highways should have a royally licensed inn spaced at four Danish miles (about 30 kilometres (19 mi)), equivalent to a day's journey on horseback or carriage.

In 1981, the innkeepers in Jutland decided to work together to attract more guests. Later, innkeepers in Funen and Zealand joined in the cooperative, which was named the "Sammenslutningen Dansk Kroferie" (Danish Inn Association). Many of the inns in the association were (and still are) royally licensed, maintaining the traditions of the past. Gradually, the association grew with the addition of hotels, castles and manor houses, and in 2000, changed its name to Danish Inns & Hotels. In 2012, they once again changed names to Small Danish Hotels.

In 2015, the association represents 90 hotels, inns and other accommodations, with a total of 4500 rooms.

=== Key dates ===
- 1981 — Sammenslutningen Dansk Kroferie (Association of Danish Inns)
- 2000 — Danish Inns & Hotels
- 2012 — Small Danish Hotels
