= Shane Prince =

American-Belarusian ice hockey player

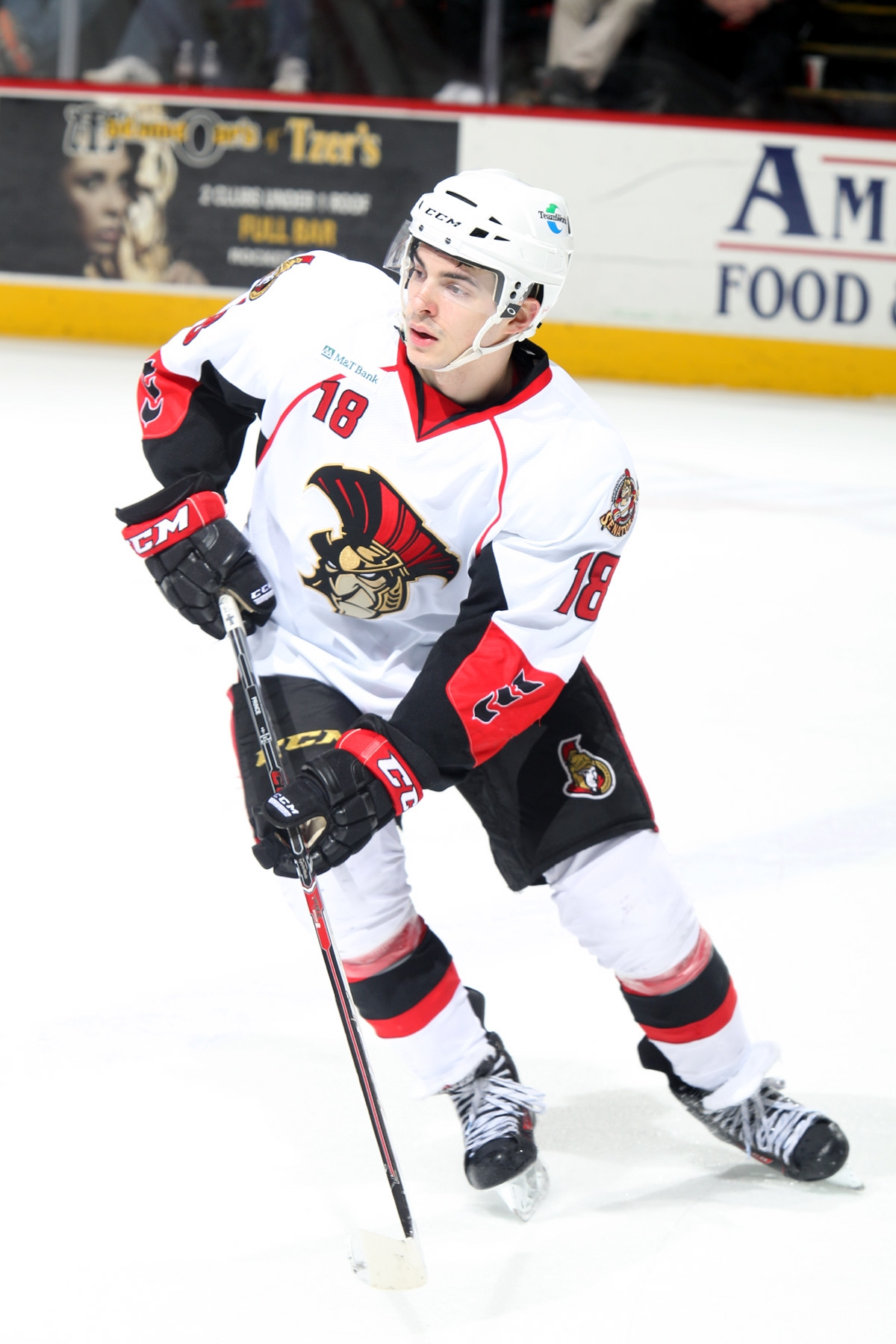
- Prince with the Binghamton Senators in 2014
- Born: November 16, 1992 (age 33) Rochester, New York, U.S.
- Height: 5 ft 11 in (180 cm)
- Weight: 193 lb (88 kg; 13 st 11 lb)
- Position: Left wing
- Shoots: Left
- KHL team Former teams: Torpedo Nizhny Novgorod; Ottawa Senators; New York Islanders; HC Davos; Sibir Novosibirsk; Dinamo Minsk; Avtomobilist Yekaterinburg; HC Lugano; Spartak Moscow; Admiral Vladivostok
- National team: Belarus
- NHL draft: 61st overall, 2011; Ottawa Senators
- Playing career: 2012–present

Shane Prince (Belarusian: Шэйн Прынц, romanized: Šejn Prync, Russian: Шейн Принс; born November 16, 1992) is an American-Belarusian professional ice hockey forward who plays for Torpedo Nizhny Novgorod of the Kontinental Hockey League (KHL). He previously played for the New York Islanders and the Ottawa Senators of the National Hockey League (NHL). He was selected by the Senators in the second round (61st overall) of the 2011 NHL entry draft. He was traded to the Islanders in February 2016.

== Playing career ==
=== Junior ===
Prince was raised in Spencerport, New York. As a youth, he played in the 2005 Quebec International Pee-Wee Hockey Tournament with a minor ice hockey team from Syracuse, New York.

Prince was selected by the Kitchener Rangers of the Ontario Hockey League in the 2008 OHL draft. Prince joined the Rangers for the 2008–09 season at age 15, as the league's youngest player.

On January 8, 2010, midway through his second OHL season, Prince was acquired by the Ottawa 67's in exchange for a third-round draft pick. In his third season, Prince became one of the OHL's top offensive players. Prince was selected to the CHL Top Prospects game played at the Air Canada Centre and scored the lone goal for Team Cherry. In April 2011, NHL Central Scouting ranked Prince 26th among North American skaters in its annual final rankings for the 2011 NHL Entry Draft.

=== Professional ===
Prince was selected in the second round, 61st overall, in the 2011 NHL Draft by the Ottawa Senators. The pick Ottawa used to select Prince was obtained from the Boston Bruins in the Chris Kelly trade.

After recording 18 goals and 38 points in 47 games with the Binghamton Senators of the American Hockey League Prince made his NHL debut with the Senators on February 16, 2015, vs the Carolina Hurricanes. Prince registered an assist in the game. He played one additional game with Ottawa and was then returned to Binghamton. Prince would go on to lead the Binghamton Senators in scoring tallying 28 Goals, 37 Assists for 65 Points while being selected to the season ending AHL All-Star Team.

Prince started the 2015–16 season with the Ottawa Senators, scoring his first NHL goal on November 25, 2015, against the Colorado Avalanche in Colorado. He finished the game with two goals and one assist and was selected as the game's first star. Although being among the team leaders in points production per 60 minutes played he was often scratched by Senators coach Dave Cameron. Prince was traded to the New York Islanders on February 29, 2016, along with a seventh round pick, in exchange for a third round pick in the 2016 NHL draft. Senators GM Bryan Murray stated in a press conference that Prince "wasn't playing much here, he deserved to play".

Prince played a regular shift for the Islanders for the remainder of the season scoring 3 goals and 2 assists in 20 games helping New York qualify for the Stanley Cup Playoffs. Prince scored his first NHL playoff goal on April 17, 2016, in game three of the first round vs the Florida Panthers. The Islanders eliminated the Panthers in six games winning their first playoff series in 23 years. In game one of the second round vs the Tampa Bay Lightning, Prince scored two goals in the first period leading the Islanders to a 5–3 victory in Tampa on April 27, 2016. Prince was named the game's first star and became the youngest Islander in 28 years to score two goals in a playoff game and the first Islander in 34 years to score a pair of first period goals in a playoff game. The Lightning eliminated the Islanders in five games with Prince finishing tied for second in team playoff goals with three.

On July 1, 2016, Prince signed a two-year contract extension with the Islanders valued at $1.7 million.

As an impending restricted free agent following the 2017–18 season, Prince was not tendered a qualifying offer by the Islanders resulting in his status as an unrestricted free agent on June 25, 2018. On August 4, 2018, Prince signed a two-year contract worth CHF 1.2 million with Swiss club, HC Davos of the National League (NL). However, on November 16, Prince terminated his contract with Davos after 16 games, stating that he intended to return to the NHL.

Prince subsequently signed a contract in the Kontinental Hockey League (KHL) with Russian based club, HC Sibir Novosibirsk, who acquired his rights from HC Vityaz on November 21, 2018. The following season, he signed with Belarusian club, Dinamo Minsk.

After two productive seasons with Dinamo Minsk, and having gained Belarusian citizenship, Prince left as a free agent to continue in the KHL with Avtomobilist Yekaterinburg, agreeing to a two-year contract on May 4, 2021. In the 2021–22 season, Prince collected 7 goals and 17 points through 33 regular season games, as Avtomobilist missed the post-season. On March 1, 2022, Prince left the KHL and joined Swiss club, HC Lugano of the NL, for the remainder of the season.

As a free agent in the off-season, Prince opted to return to the KHL, agreeing to a one-year contract with HC Spartak Moscow, on July 11, 2022.

== International career ==
On January 26, 2021, the Belarus Ice Hockey Federation announced that Prince had accepted an offer to play for the Belarus men's national ice hockey team in the 2021 IIHF World Championship.

== Career statistics ==
=== Regular season and playoffs ===
			Regular season					Playoffs
Season	Team	League	GP	G	A	Pts	PIM	GP	G	A	Pts	PIM
2007–08	Maksymum Jr. Hockey	EmJHL	35	15	31	46	10	—	—	—	—	—
2007–08	Syracuse Stars	EJHL	11	3	3	6	4	—	—	—	—	—
2008–09	Kitchener Rangers	OHL	63	3	9	12	34	—	—	—	—	—
2009–10	Kitchener Rangers	OHL	39	8	9	17	32	—	—	—	—	—
2009–10	Ottawa 67's	OHL	26	7	6	13	13	12	2	2	4	4
2010–11	Ottawa 67's	OHL	59	25	63	88	18	3	1	0	1	0
2011–12	Ottawa 67's	OHL	57	43	47	90	12	18	7	9	16	6
2012–13	Binghamton Senators	AHL	65	18	17	35	24	3	1	0	1	0
2013–14	Binghamton Senators	AHL	69	21	27	48	53	4	1	1	2	0
2014–15	Binghamton Senators	AHL	72	28	37	65	31	—	—	—	—	—
2014–15	Ottawa Senators	NHL	2	0	1	1	0	—	—	—	—	—
2015–16	Ottawa Senators	NHL	42	3	9	12	6	—	—	—	—	—
2015–16	New York Islanders	NHL	20	3	2	5	4	11	3	1	4	0
2016–17	New York Islanders	NHL	50	5	13	18	18	—	—	—	—	—
2017–18	New York Islanders	NHL	14	1	1	2	11	—	—	—	—	—
2017–18	Bridgeport Sound Tigers	AHL	4	0	2	2	0	—	—	—	—	—
2018–19	HC Davos	NL	16	3	3	6	10	—	—	—	—	—
2018–19	Sibir Novosibirsk	KHL	30	6	13	19	6	—	—	—	—	—
2019–20	Dinamo Minsk	KHL	55	12	17	29	23	—	—	—	—	—
2020–21	Dinamo Minsk	KHL	52	25	24	49	45	5	1	5	6	2
2021–22	Avtomobilist Yekaterinburg	KHL	33	7	10	17	10	—	—	—	—	—
2021–22	HC Lugano	NL	3	2	4	6	2	4	0	0	0	0
2022–23	Spartak Moscow	KHL	50	17	18	35	37	—	—	—	—	—
2023–24	Spartak Moscow	KHL	58	17	12	29	24	5	0	2	2	6
2024–25	Spartak Moscow	KHL	13	3	4	7	4	—	—	—	—	—
2024–25	Admiral Vladivostok	KHL	27	5	3	8	6	6	1	1	2	2
NHL totals			128	12	26	38	39	11	3	1	4	0
KHL totals			318	92	101	193	155	16	2	8	10	10

=== International ===
Year	Team	Event	Result	GP	G	A	Pts	PIM
2021	Belarus	WC	15th	4	1	1	2	2
2021	Belarus	OGQ	NQ	3	1	1	2	4
Senior totals				7	2	2	4	6

== Awards and honors ==
Award	Year
CHL
CHL Top Prospects Game	2011
AHL
All-Star Game	2015
Second all-star team	2015
