= Suhr House =

Building in Copenhagen

- Den Suhrske Gård
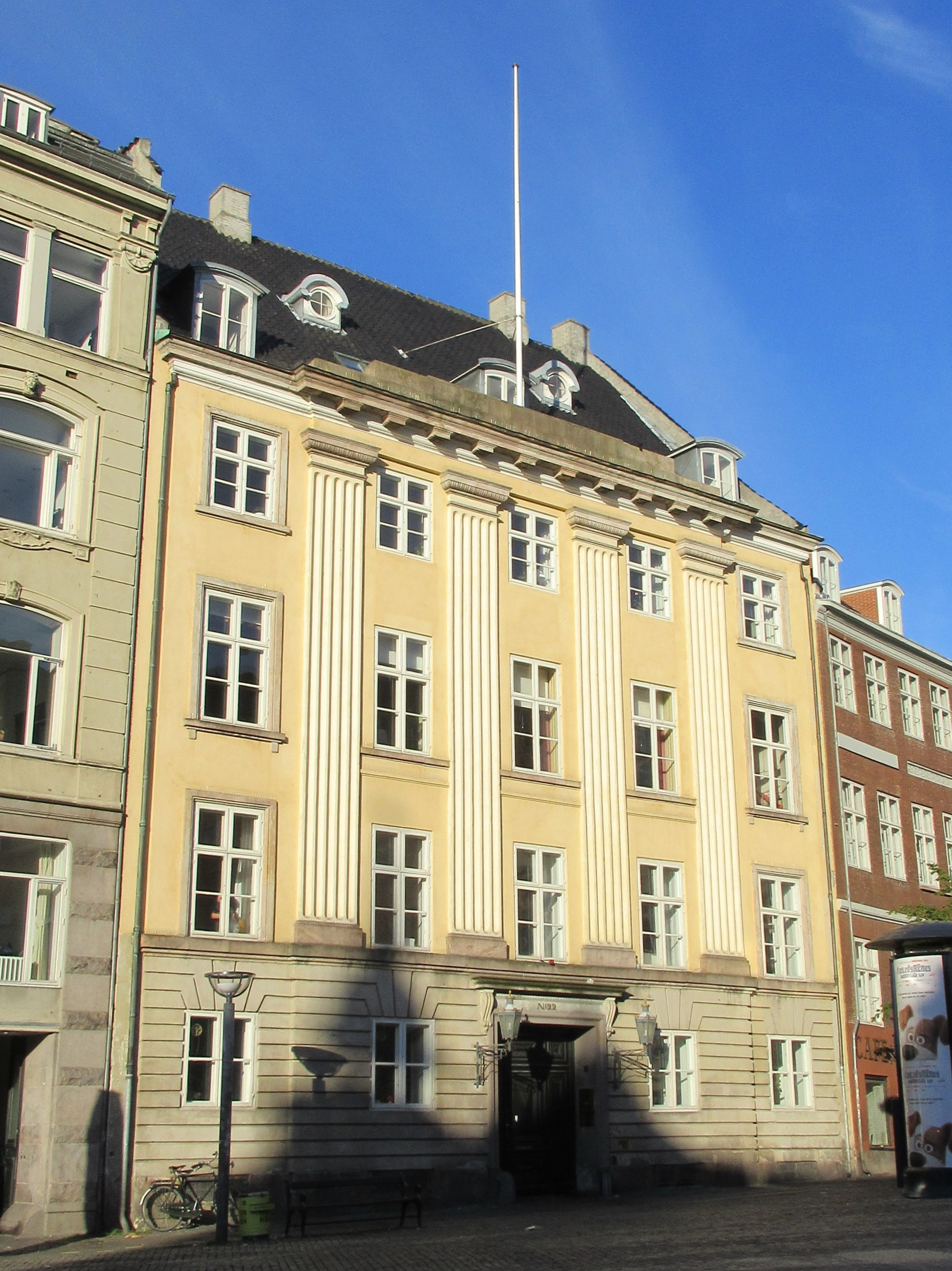
- Interactive map of the Suhr House area

General information
- Location: Copenhagen, Denmark
- Coordinates: 55°40′40.72″N 12°34′17.91″E
- Construction started: 1796
- Completed: 1797
- Client: Ole Berendt Suhr
- Owner: Den Suhrske Stiftelse

The Suhr House (Danish: Den Suhrske Gård) is a listed Neoclassical property located at Gammeltorv 22 in central Copenhagen, Denmark. The site has been owned by the Suhr family since 1749. The current building was built for Peter Bernt Suhr and are now owned by Den Suhrske Stiftelse, a family trust created by his son Theodor Suhr, its owner from 1815 to 1860.

== History ==
In the late 18th century, the site was made up of three smaller properties. One of them was listed in Copenhagen's first cadastre from 1689 as No. 120 in Western Quarter, owned by grocer (urtekræmmer) Henrik Røbe. Another was listed as No. 121 in Western Quarter, owned by grocer (høker) Niels Nielsen. The third was owned by 206 in Western Quarter, owned by ship captain Lars Andersen.

=== Ole Hansen Aagaard ===
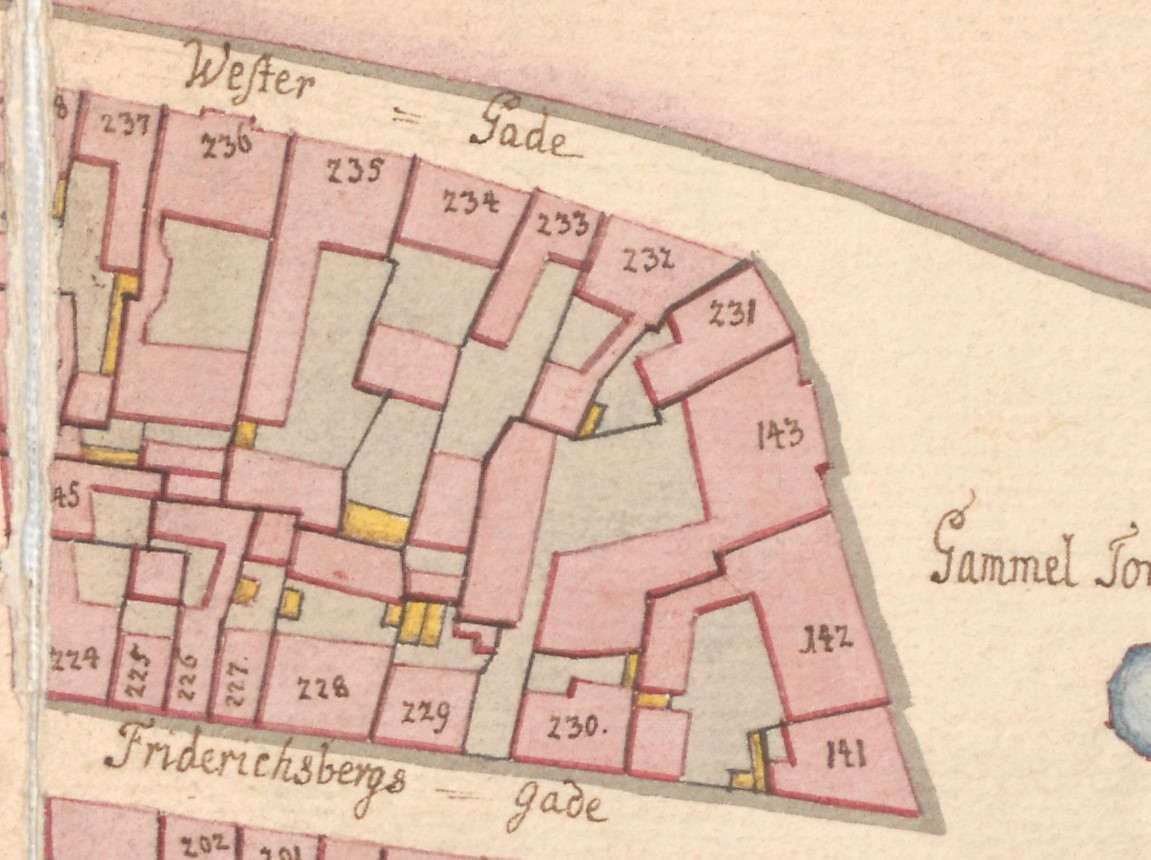
No.143 seen in a detail from Christian Gedde's map of Copenhagen's West Quarter, 1757

Mo. 120 was later acquired by grocer (hørkræmmer) Ole Hansen Aagaard (1790–1749). On 28 November 1718, he was granted citizenship as a hørkræmmer. His property was destroyed in the Copenhagen Fire of 1728, together with Copenhagen City Hall and most of the other buildings in the area. After the fire, Aagaard bought the two adjacent fire sites No. 121 and No. 206. This enabled him to build a much larger building complex on the site. On 27 October 1738, Aagaard was also granted citizenship as a wholesaler (grosserer). On 7 March 1740 to 14 March 1743, he served as one of the directors of Kjøbenhavns Brandforsikring.

=== Johan Peter Suhr ===
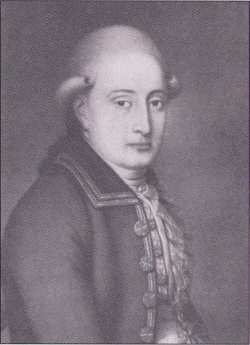
Johan Peter

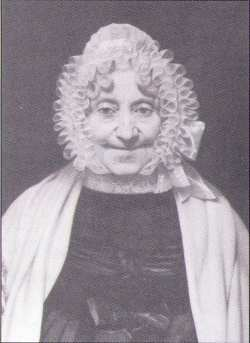
Anna Dorothea Suhr, née Aagaard

In 1728, Johan Peter Suhr started an apprenticeship in Aagaard's firm. On 22 November 1748, he married Aagaard's daughter, Anna Dorthea Aagaard. Aagaard's second-oldest daughter, Elisabeth Cathrine Aagaard, was married to the hørkræmmer Mathias Wassard (father of Hans Wassard). The youngest daughter, Sophie, was married to Court Agent Peter Borre.

In 1749, Suhr took over his father-in-law's business at Gammeltorv. Under his leadership, it developed into a thriving trading house. His son Ole Bernt Suhr became a partner in the company in 1782. In the new cadastre of 1756, Aagaard's property was listed as No. 143 in Western Quarter.

=== Ole Bernt Suhr and the new building ===
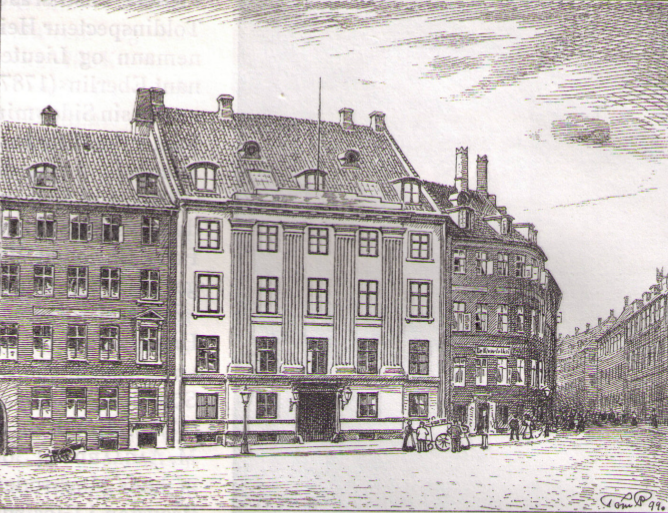
The Suhr House in 1899, drawing by Peter Tom-Petersen

Johan Peter Suhr died on 28 May 1785. Ten years later, on 5 July 1795, the Copenhagen Fire of 1795 destroyed the entire area around Gammeltorv. The current complex of buildings at the site was built for Ole Berendt Suhr in 1796–1797. The architect or builder is not known.

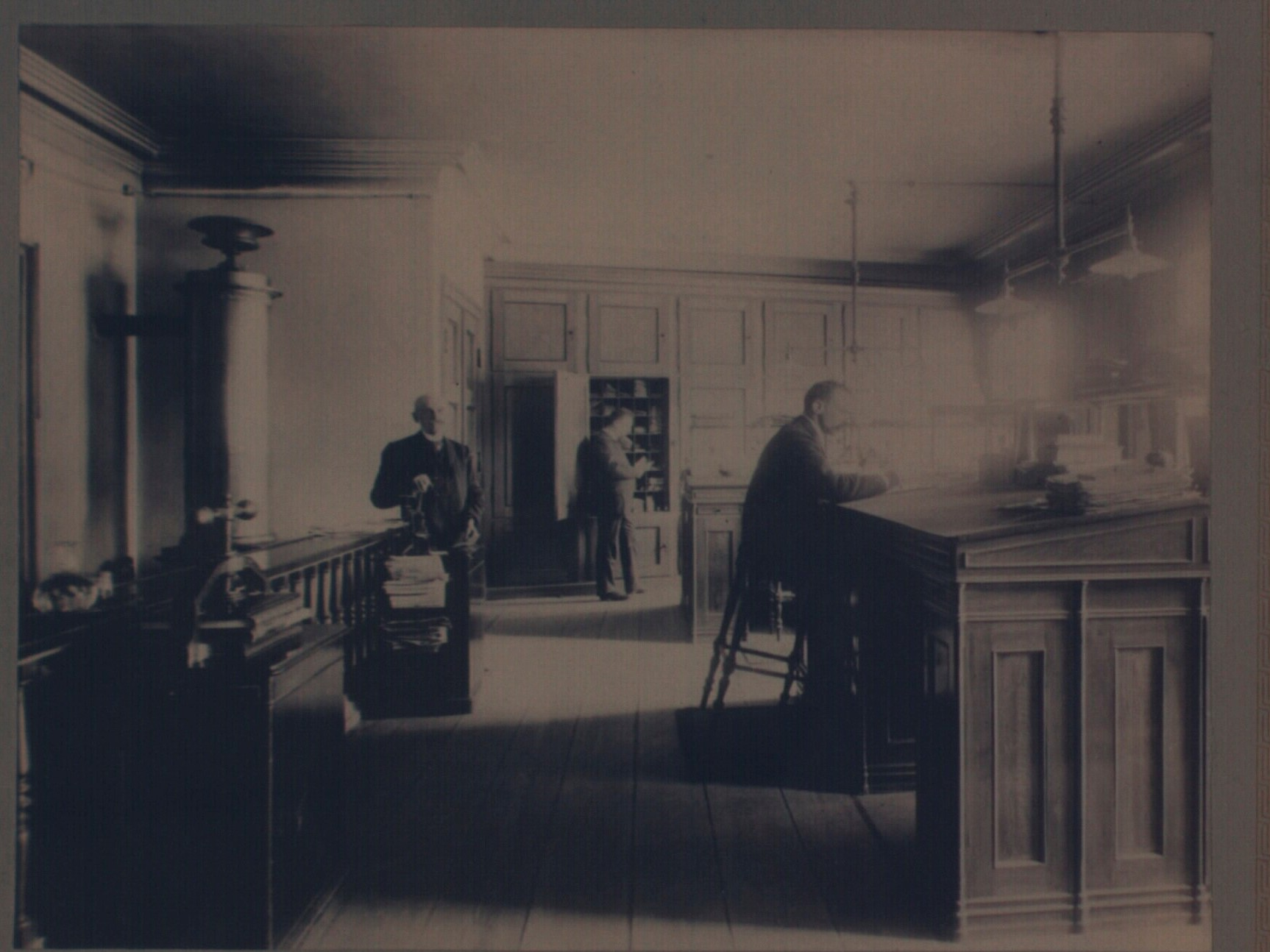
Suhr's office at Gammeltorv 22

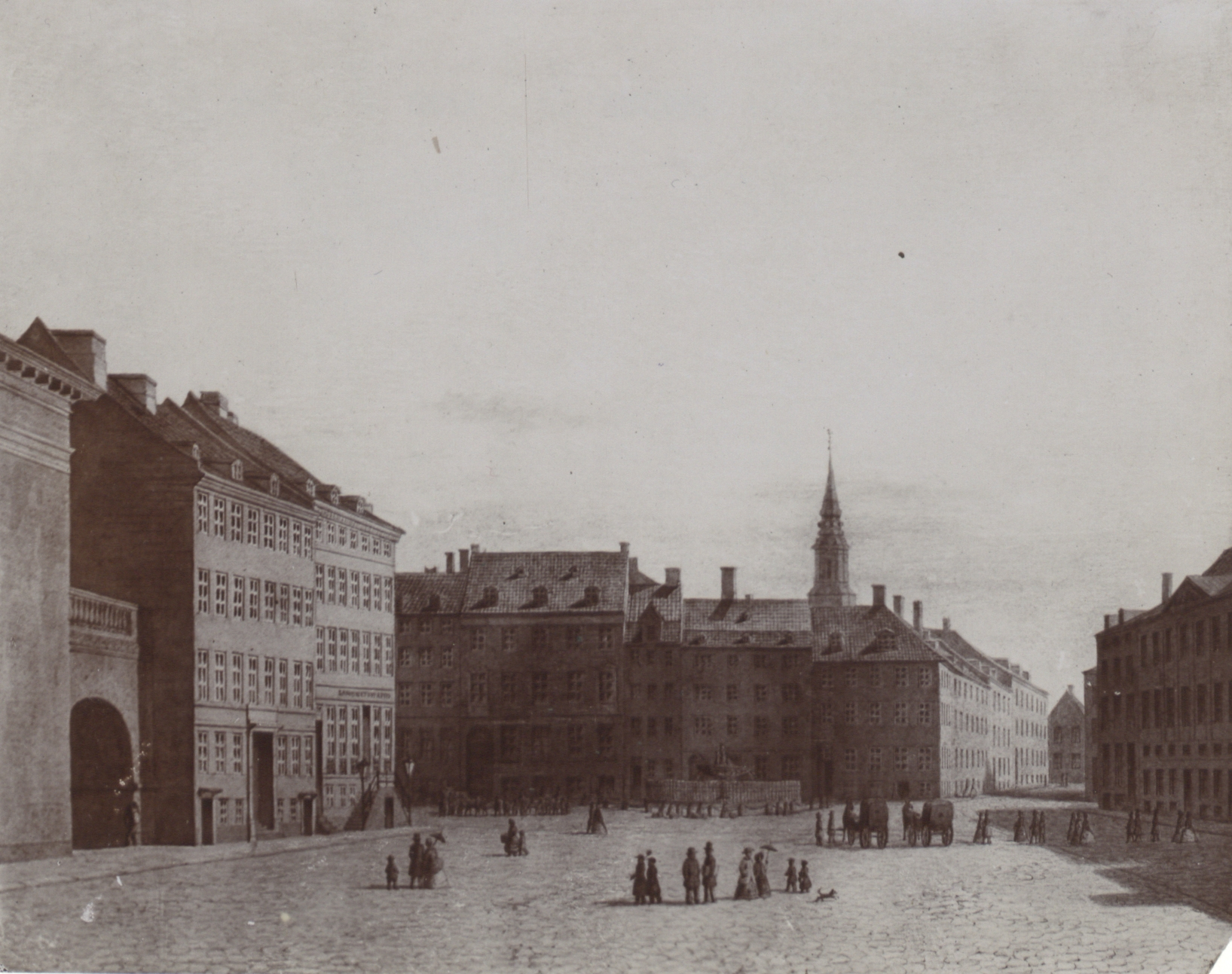
The house viewed on a watercolour by M.W. Hansen, 1853

Ole Bernt Suhr's son, Theodor Suhr (1792–1858), took over the company as well as the property in Gammeltorv after his father died in 1814. He mixed with the cultural and political elite. Johan Ludvig Heiberg and Johanne Luise Heiberg were frequent visitors in the house. Later, Suhr also acquired the country house Sølyst north of Copenhagen and the estate Bonderup at Holbæk.

Suhr lived in the house until 1856. Having no children, he passed it on to his nephew Ole Suhr. Ole Suhr lived in the complex from 1839 to 1847 and again from 1860 to 1875.

== Architecture ==
The ground floor has rustication. The central projects on the upper floors are decorated with four Ionic order pilasters and tipped by a reiangular pediment. The complex also comprises a side wing and a rear wing. All walls facing the courtyard stand in blank, red brick.

== See also ==
- Listed buildings in Copenhagen Municipality
