= Danielle Downey =

American professional golfer (1980–2014)

Personal information
- Full name: Danielle Elizabeth Downey
- Nickname: Deuce
- Nationality: United States
- Born: December 6, 1980 Rochester, New York, U.S.
- Died: January 30, 2014 (aged 33) Lee County, Alabama, U.S.
- Height: 5 ft 8 in (1.73 m)

Career
- Sport: Golf
- College: Auburn University (five years)
- Turned professional: 2003
- Former tours: Futures Tour (2004–2007); LPGA Tour (2006–2010)
- Professional wins: 1

Number of wins by tour
- Epson Tour: 1

Best results in LPGA major championships
- Chevron Championship: DNP
- Women's PGA C'ship: 79th: 2008
- U.S. Women's Open: DNP
- Women's British Open: DNP

Danielle Elizabeth Downey (December 6, 1980 – January 30, 2014) was an American professional golfer. She won golf tournaments at the collegiate level, Sun Coast events and on the Futures Tour. She played on the LPGA Tour from 2006 to 2010.

== Early life and amateur career ==
In 1980, Downey was born in Rochester, New York. She attended Spencerport High School. She was a 1,000 point scorer for the girls basketball team and played on the boys varsity golf team.

Downey was a three time All-American and four-time All-SEC team at Auburn University. She won the 2000 SEC Championship. She led Auburn to the SEC team championships in 2000 and 2003. She was a two-time US vs. Japan team member.

Downey also won the New York State Women's amateur golf tournament three consecutive years (1999–2001) while still in college.

== Professional career ==
In 2003, Downey turned professional. She played on the Futures Tour from 2004 to 2007. She won one Futures Tour event, the Lima Memorial Hospital FUTURES Golf Classic.

She then the LPGA Tour from 2006 to 2010. Her best finish on the LPGA Tour was 4th place at the 2008 Bell Micro LPGA Classic.

== Death and legacy ==
Downey was killed in a single-vehicle crash on Lee County Route 57 approximately four miles outside of Auburn, Alabama on January 30, 2014. She lost control of her vehicle and it overturned several times before striking a tree. She was ejected from the vehicle. She was not wearing a seat belt. Alcohol was cited as a factor in the accident.

The 2015 Toyota Danielle Downey Classic, a tournament on the Symetra Tour, was held in Downey's honor at Brook Lea Country Club, where she was a member. Proceeds went to benefit Downey's scholarship fund for young golfers.

== Professional wins (1) ==
=== Futures Tour wins (1) ===
- 2004 Lima Memorial Hospital FUTURES Golf Classic
