= Johannes Theodorus Suhr =

Danish merchant and industrialist (1792–1858)

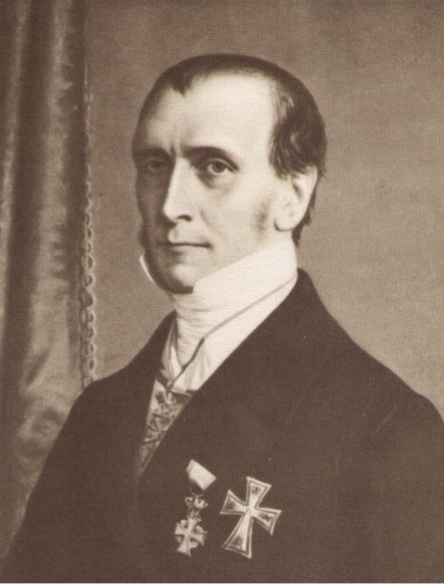
- Portrait of Theodor Suhr by Marstrand
- Born: 2 April 1792; Copenhagen, Denmark
- Died: 10 November 1858 (aged 66); Copenhagen, Denmark
- Occupations: Merchant and industrialist
- Known for: Den Suhrske Stiftelse

Johannes Theodor(us) Suhr (2 April 1792 – 10 November 1858) was a Danish merchant and industrialist. He owned the Suhr House at Gammeltorv in Copenhagen as well as Sølyst north of the city and was the founder of the foundation Den Suhrske Stiftelse.

== Early life ==
Suhr was born into a wealthy family of merchants in Copenhagen in 1792. His father was Ole Berendt Suhr, owner of J. P. Suhr & Søn, which had been founded by Johan Peter Suhr (1712–1785). The company traded in a wide range of products, including coal, salt, linum and hemp. It survived the difficult years during the war with England in the 1800s. Theodor Stuhr finished school and had plans to study theology.

== Career ==
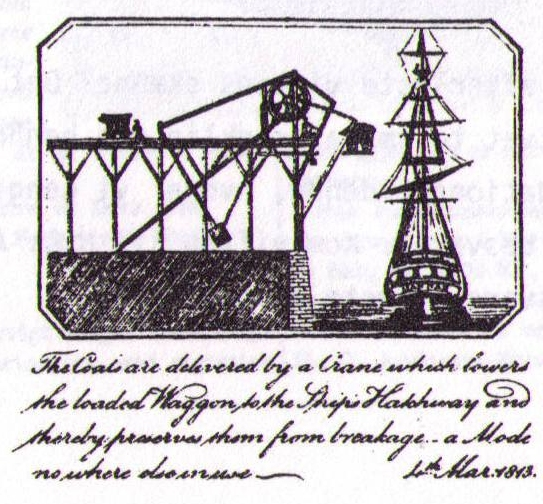
A bill of lading from J. P. Suhr & Søn with a drawing of coal loading in an English port

When their father died in 1815, he and his elder brother Didrik Suhr joined the management of the company which was formally owned by their mother until her death in 1842. The company went through a difficult period with the settlement of its activities in Norway followed by an agricultural crisis but experienced new growth in the late 1820s and early 1830s. The company increasingly specialized in import of coal and iron from Sweden and England. In the 1830s, J. P. Suhr & Søn had a market share of more than 20% of the Danish import of coal and it later grew to 33%. The company was also active as a money lender with ties to leading bankers in Hamburg.

In 1827, Suhr moved into the industrial sector when he leased the rolling mill in Frederiksberg. He established a production of copper plates and installed the first large, Danish-built steam engine (20 j hp) in 1828. In 1830, he acquired Brede Copper Mill (Brede Værk). In the 1850s, he sold those activities but continued to have investments in industrial enterprises such as Ørholm, Strandmøllen and M. P. Allerup. He had also investments in industrial enterprises abroad.

When his mother died in 1842, Suhr became the sole owner of the company after buying out his brother and sisters. At this point he had an estimated net worth of 800,000 Danish rigsdaler and by 1853 it had doubled to 1.6 million rigsdaler. In late 1855 he ceded the company to his nephew Ole Berendt Suhr (1813–1875) but remained active in it for another few years.

== Property ==
In 1840, Suhr acquired the Schimmelmann family's country house Sølyst in Klampenborg. He kept a large household and socialized with the cultural and political elite. Suhr acquired Bonderup in Holbæk in 1853 and Merløsegaard in 1856.

== Personal life ==
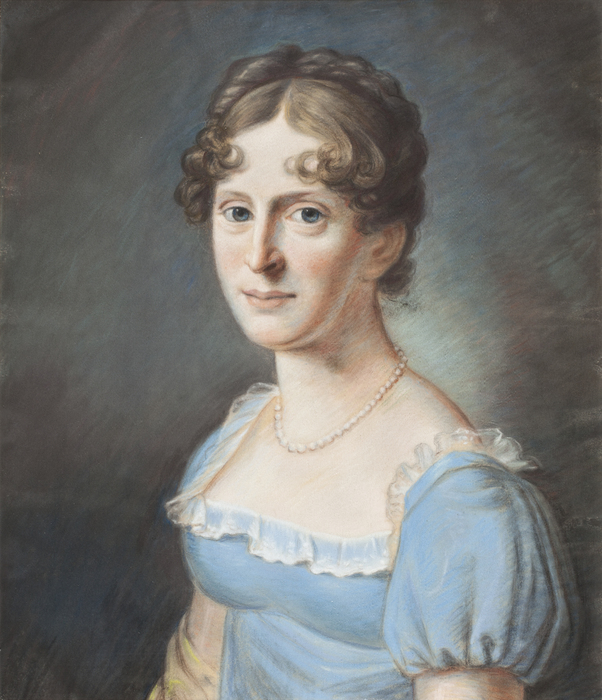
Christine Caroline Andrea Suhr

Suhr married Christine Caroline Andrea Falch on 30 March 1816 in the Church of the Holy Ghost in Copenhagen. She was the daughter of merchant and bank commissioner Andreas Falck and his wife Charlotte Sophie Suhr (1756–1822). The couple had no children.

Suhr took active part in public life. He was a member of the Council of 32 Men from 1822 to 1835. He was active in the preparations for the first stændervalg and was also active in Trykkefrihedsadressen in 1835. He was appointed to council of state in 1847.

He constructed a summer residence at Bonderup, where he died in 1860. He is buried in Gentofte Cemetery. He left his fortune to a foundation, Den Suhrske Stiftelse. J. P. Suhr & Søn was dissolved in 1897 after selling its activities to A/S Det danske Kulkompagni.
