= Johan Peter Suhr =

Danish merchant (1712–1785)

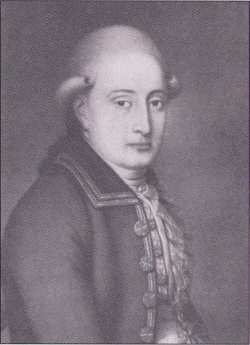
- Born: 1712; Lolland, Denmark
- Died: 28 May 1785 (aged 72–73); Bonderup, Holbæk Municipality, Denmark
- Occupation: Merchant
- Known for: J. P. Suhr & Søn

Johan Peter Suhr (1712–1785) was a Danish merchant and founder of the trading house J. P. Suhr & Søn. He served as burgermaster of Copenhagen under Struense. He was the grandfather of Theodor Suhr.

== Early life and education ==
Johan Peter Suhr was born in Købelev Rectory on the island of Lolland, the son of provost of Købelev and Vindeby Bernt Frederik Suhr and his wife Christine Suhr (née Hornemann). He started an apprenticeship in 1728 with flax shopkeeper Oluf Hansen Aagaard on Gammeltorv in Copenhagen. On 22 November 1748, he married the Aagaard's daughter, Anna Dorthea Aagaard.

== Career ==
Suhr took over the business when his father-in-law died in 1749. He became a member of the Flax Shopkeeper's Guild in 1750. The company thrived and Suhr became a grocer in 1767. He traded in a wide range of products, including tar, linum, hemp, coal, lead and salt. He was also active as a broker and was director of Søe-Assurance Compagniet and a sugar refinery in Store Kongensgade (Interessenters Sukkerhus). He served as an accountant at Det Kongelige Oktroi-erede Handelskompagni. He was also involved in speculative investments in land, iron and grain and owned his own ships. His fortune grew from 7,200 Danish rigsdaler in 1750 to 51,000 rigsdaler in 1760, to 129,000 rigsdaler in 1770 and to 214,000 rigsdaler in 1780.

Suhr had a reputation for being honest, pious and philanthropic. In 1761, he became a councilman (Rådmand). In 1771, he became deputy burgermaster.

== Personal life and legacy ==
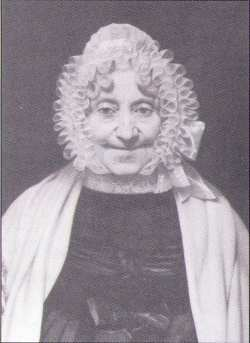
Anna Dorothea Hansdatter Aagaard

Suhr's son Ole Bernt Suhr (1762–1815) became a partner in the company in 1782. Being the only surviving son among Johan Peter Suhr's eight children, he became sole owner of the family business after his father's death on 28 May 1785. He was married to Dorothea Beckman (Beckmann) (1759–1842)., a daughter of brewer and councilman Diderik Barthold Beckmann (1721–1790).

Suhr's eldest daughter Anna Elisabeth Suhr (1751 - 1820) was married to Johan Peter Hjotshøy (1770-). The daughter Christiane Suhr (1752–1782) was married to Supreme Court attorney Lucas Debes (1741–1777). The daughter Cathrine Marie Johansdatter Suhr (1754–1824) was married to konferensråd Christen Schow (1738–1806). The daughter Charlotte Caroline Sophie Suhr (1756–1822) was married to businessman (grosserer) and bank commissioner Andreas Falch (1748–1798).

== See also ==
- J. P. Suhr & Søn
