= Rick Suhr =

American pole vault coach (born 1967)

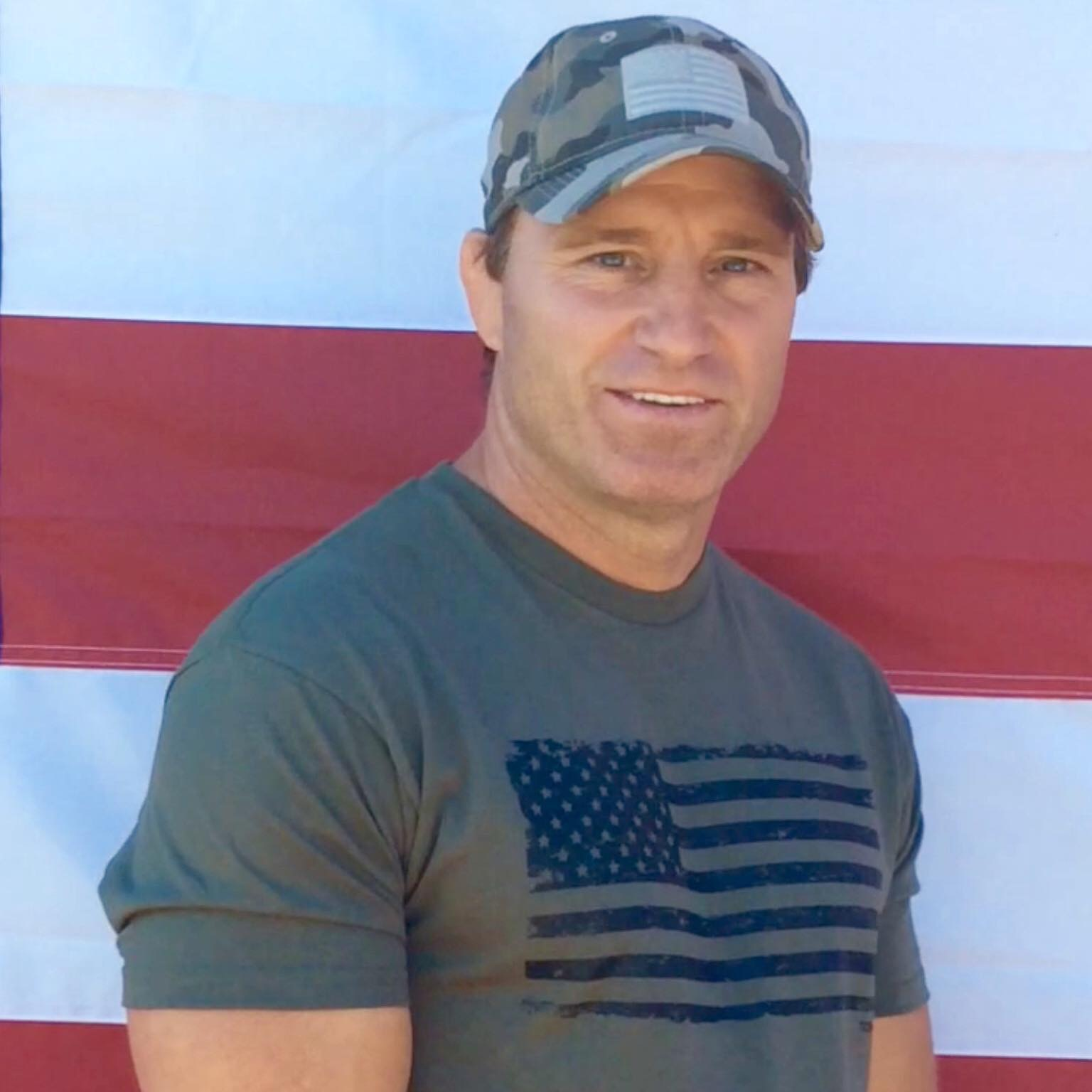

Personal information
- Full name: Richard Suhr
- Nationality: American
- Born: 1967 (age 58–59)
- Spouse: Jenn Suhr (m. 2010)

Sport
- Country: United States
- Sport: Track and field athletics
- Event: Pole vault
- Club: Suhr Sports
- Now coaching: 1994–present

Richard "Rick" Suhr (pronounced like "sir", born 1967) is an American Olympic level pole vaulting coach in Rochester, New York who coached the #1 women's vaulter in the World from beginner to World #1 two years in a row. He has been awarded the National Coach of the Year for the 2nd consecutive year at the professional level. In the last 8 years, Suhr's athletes have won 18 National Championships and set 16 National Records in the pole vault at the high school, collegiate, and professional levels. Suhr is the only pole vault coach to have received the United States Olympic Committee's Ikkos award (excellence in coaching). He has received this award twice: 2008, 2012. His most notable athlete, Jennifer Suhr has set the American Pole Vault Record 10 times and won the US National Championships 14 different times and is the only American woman ever to clear 16 feet and has done so 8 different times. Jenn Suhr has jumped the 12 highest heights ever by an American women. She also took first in the U.S. Olympic Trials during which she raised her own American Record in the process. Other athletes include HS National Champions Dan Tierney, and Tiffany Maskulinski.

Suhr's contribution to American pole vaulting has had tremendous impact on the sport. He has improved pole vault safety and technique through clinics, public speaking, and his consultation service at the youth level. Suhr has been a big advocate in helping push professional pole vaulting back into the American Track and Field circuit.

Suhr's success over the last 8-year period took the National pole vault scene by surprise. This drew incredible interest and criticism. Suhr's competitors identify him to be at the highest expert level in what he does (pole vault technique). Suhr was quoted responding to criticism, "Success breeds incredible jealousy, first people say you are lucky, then they criticize your technique, then when they can no longer do that, they attack you personally and simply say “we don’t like his coaching style or philosophy”. Suhr started his career as a public educator teaching in the public education system.

Suhr is the youngest of four brothers who have had celebrated wrestling careers. Suhr's background included: a state championship in wrestling, All-American status and inductions into The Wrestling Hall of Fame and Spencerport Athletic Hall of Fame. He and his brother John remain one of the few brother combinations to both win the New York State Wrestling Championships.

He founded Suhr Conditioning Systems in 1993 and built an indoor pole vault training facility behind his home in 1997. The business later became known as Suhr Sports. There he trained athletes from numerous disciplines including football, wrestling, and track and field.

In 2020 Rick Suhr authored the book "Running Into The Headwind: The Price of Olympic Gold The Untold Story" about his life in coaching and particularly the success of Jenn Suhr.

== Coaching career ==
=== 2004 ===
- Coached High School National Champion (Tiffany Maskulinski) and Runner-Up (Jenn O'Neil)
- Coached Indoor High School National Champion (Dan Tierney)
- Coached NAIA National Champion (Renee Evans)

=== 2005 ===
- Coached the 1st and 2nd High School Girls ever to the 14’ barrier, High School National Champion Mary Saxer and Runner-Up Tiffany Maskulinski
- Coached Jennifer Stuczynski from beginner to US National Champion in just 10 months

=== 2006 ===
- Coached Jenn Stuczynski to 5 consecutive indoor jumps over the 15’ barrier earning a contract with adidas
- Concludes other coaching to exclusively coach Jenn Suhr in the pole vault.
- Coached US Outdoor National Champion

=== 2007 ===
- Coached Jennifer Suhr, the first American woman (and the second woman in the world), to jump the 16’ barrier
- Coached the winner of both the Indoor and Outdoor American Titles

=== 2008 ===
- Coached at the U.S. Olympic trials, setting an American Record of 4.92m (16'1¾")
- Coached Silver Medalist Jennifer Stuczynski at the 2008 Beijing Olympics
- Was the first Pole Vault Coach to receive the Order of Ikkos award by the USOC

=== 2009 ===
- Coached the winner of both the Indoor and Outdoor American Titles
- Coached breaking the American Indoor Record twice

=== 2010 ===
- Coached the highest jump in the world for 2010
- Coached the winner of the US Outdoor Title.

On January 3, 2010, Jenn Stuczynski married Suhr, legally changing her name to Jennifer Lynn Suhr. They reside in Suhr's hometown of Rochester, New York, USA.

=== 2011 ===
- Coached US Indoor Champion to break the American Indoor Record and win the Visa Championship
- Coached Jenn Suhr to the #1 ranking in the World
- Awarded National Coach of the Year in Pole Vault

=== 2012 ===
- Coached Jenn Suhr to jump an Indoor American Record, and Olympic trials victory making her a 2x champ and 2x olympian
- Coached Jenn Suhr to an unexpected Gold medal winning performance in the finals of the Women's Pole Vault competition at the London 2012 Olympics on August 6, 2012.
- Coached Jenn Suhr to #1 Ranking in the World
- Awarded USOC Order of Ikkos for excellence in coaching
- Received National Coach of the Year in Pole Vault

=== 2013 ===
- Coached Jenn Suhr to the Indoor World Record and her 13th US Title.
- Coached Jenn Suhr to win US Outdoor Nationals

Since 2006, Suhr has exclusively coached Jennifer Suhr (Stuczynski) to 17 US Titles, 12 American pole vault records, Olympic Trials Record, five World Medals (including an Olympic Gold and an Olympic Silver), and an Indoor World Record of 16' 5 1/2". She is the 1st American pole vaulter to receive 2 Olympic Medals in 40 years.

2016 Led Jenn Suhr to her 17th US National Championship, an unprecedented 3rd Olympic Trial Championship and A World Indoor Championship. His athlete would record a perfect championship without a single miss for the first time by anyone ever in a World Championship.

2022 Rick Suhr announced his retirement from competitive pole vaulting along with his wife. He had coached and won Olympic Gold, World Gold, World Record,12 American Records and 17 US Championship Titles. He is the only coach to have done this. He still continues to consult and teach coaches and athletes privately in Rochester NY.
