= Jørgen Conrad de Falsen =

Norwegian naval officer

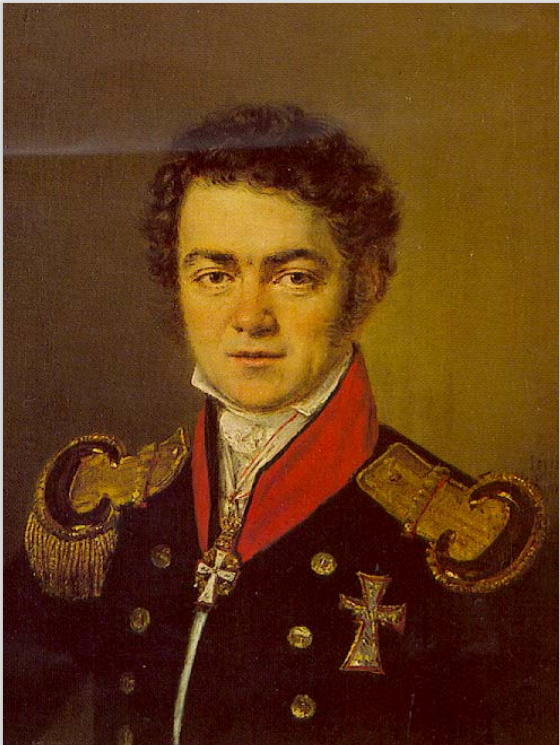
- Falsen c. 1828
- Born: 19 August 1785; Oslo, Norway
- Died: 23 August 1849 (aged 64); Funen, Denmark
- Burial place: Holmens Kirke, Copenhagen; 55°40′36″N 12°35′0″E
- Relatives: Father: Enevold De Falsen; Brother: Christian Magnus Falsen
- Military career
- Allegiance: Denmark-Norway
- Branch: Royal Dano-Norwegian Navy; Royal Danish Navy
- Service years: 1797–1848
- Rank: Counter-Admiral (Royal Danish Navy)
- Conflicts: Gunboat War; Battle of Anholt

Counter-Admiral Jørgen Conrad de Falsen (19 August 1785 – 23 August 1849) was a Dano-Norwegian naval officer who served in the French Revolutionary and Napoleonic Wars. Despite being plagued by ill health, he saw active service in the Royal Dano-Norwegian Navy throughout the Gunboat War. After the dissolution of the personal union between Denmark and Norway, he served in the Royal Danish Navy where he eventually rose to the rank of rear admiral. He married twice, the second marriage being to a lady-in-waiting to the Queen of Denmark.

== Family ==
His father, Enevold De Falsen (1755–1808) married Anna Henrikka Petronelle Mathiesen (1762–1825) in 1781. They had 7 children, including the statesman Christian Magnus Falsen (1782–1830) and the county governor Carl Valentin de Falsen (1787–1852). Their fourth child, Jørgen Conrad de Falsen was born on 19 August 1785 in Kristiania (now Oslo).

== Early career ==
De Falsen joined the Danish-Norwegian navy as a volunteer cadet in 1797, becoming a midshipman in 1798 and acting lieutenant in 1801. Promoted to junior lieutenant in 1802, he served in Friderichssteen on a cruise to the Danish West Indies in 1802–1803. Returning in poor health, he was granted six months' sick leave—extended to nine months—before resuming duties and in 1805 returning to the Danish West Indies in the frigate Diane, a voyage followed by another extended period of leave.

In April and May 1807 he was first officer on board the frigate Triton, and later in 1807 in charge of troop transports bringing Danish soldiers from Femern to Lolland, skilfully navigating the treacherous waters with his vessels thanks to his navigational experience. Later the same year, he was promoted to senior lieutenant. In 1808 and early 1809 he was stationed on the Scheldt, where Danes crewed and officered Pultusk (or Pulstuck) and Dantzick, two French ships-of-the-line. When the Danish captains were replaced on 28 January 1809 with French ones, Falsen and fellow officer Senior Lieutenant Frederick Christian Holsten resigned in protest and refused to obey orders, so they were arrested and sent to Frederickshavn Citadel to serve a six-month detention.

== Gunboat War ==
In July 1809 Falsen was posted to a gunboat flotilla in the Great Belt, but in August was ordered from Nyborg to Fladstrand. Whilst travelling to his new post, he injured his knee in a cart accident, so P. M. Tuxen took command at Fladstrand. Falsen's organisation of naval aspects of the abortive 1810 expedition to Anholt in February and March of that year failed due to short notice, winter leave for the gunboat crews, ice and storm; Falsen sought to exonerate himself in a report to the Danish king. After this he was posted to Fladstrand under the command of Lieutenant P. M. Tuxen. In an engagement lasting some ninety minutes, Falsen's flotilla of four gunboats exchanged heavy fire with a British frigate of 32 guns on 27 April 1810 off Skagen (The Skaw) before both sides broke off the fight. (Note: The London Gazette records that HMS Tribune engaged four Danish gunboats on 12 May 1810. It is unclear if this is the same incident.)

On 12 September 1810 off Læsø, Falsen captured HMS Alban, which the Danes took into service as The Alban. It was recaptured just seven months later. In early 1811, now the officer commanding Fladstrand and Hals (Note: Hals, at the eastern entrance to limfjord, is thirty miles south of Fladstrand) flotilla, the prize money that was owed to him was finally given. During the Battle of Anholt on 23 March 1811, Falsen was in command. The most senior army officer in the attack, Major Melsted, was killed during the battle. The Danes were defeated and Falsen was captured, but he was exchanged on 8 April 1811 during a prisoner exchange and was landed in Jutland. On the 4th of July Falsen's flotilla engaged a British convoy near Hjelm. During the engagement Falsen was wounded in action when HMS Sheldrake captured his vessel, Gunboat No 2. Again, he was exchanged a few days later. In November 1811 Falsen was off sick due to his battle wounds worsening, but on 19 August 1812 he was again involved in an action when he captured the brig HMS Attack off Grenå.

== Post-war ==
In the immediate post-war years de Falsen undertook several foreign study tours but his health was poor, and he was given extended leave on health grounds in 1835. He continued to suffer from liver disease and gallstones, but eventually retired from the Danish navy at the rank of counter admiral in 1848.

== Marriage ==
Falsen's first marriage was to Cecilie Catharine Hoier in 1811. She died in 1817, and he married Jørgine Elisabeth Rosenkrantz on 9 November 1825. He had two sons, Enevold (1813–1867) and Niels.

== Death ==
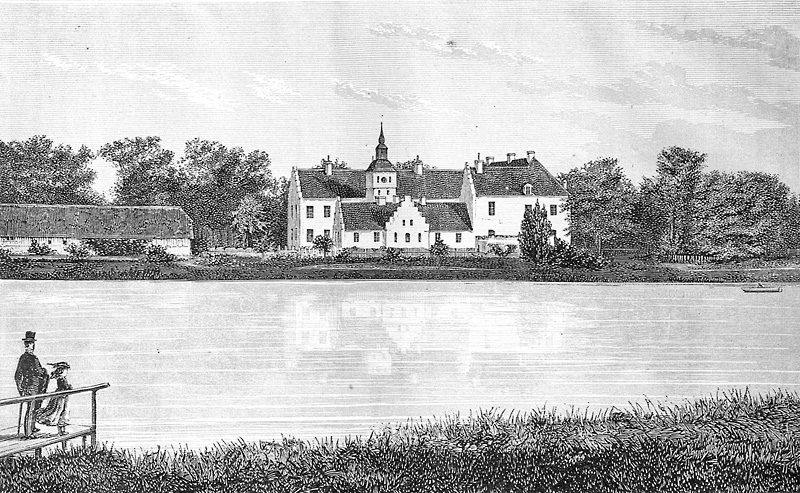
Falsen's Søbysøgård estate

Falsen died on 23 August 1849 on the estate of Søbysøgård on Funen, which he had bought in 1845. (Note: It is now the site of an open prison.) He is buried at the Danish Naval Church på Holmen in Copenhagen.
