= HMS Sheldrake (1806) =

Brig of the Royal Navy

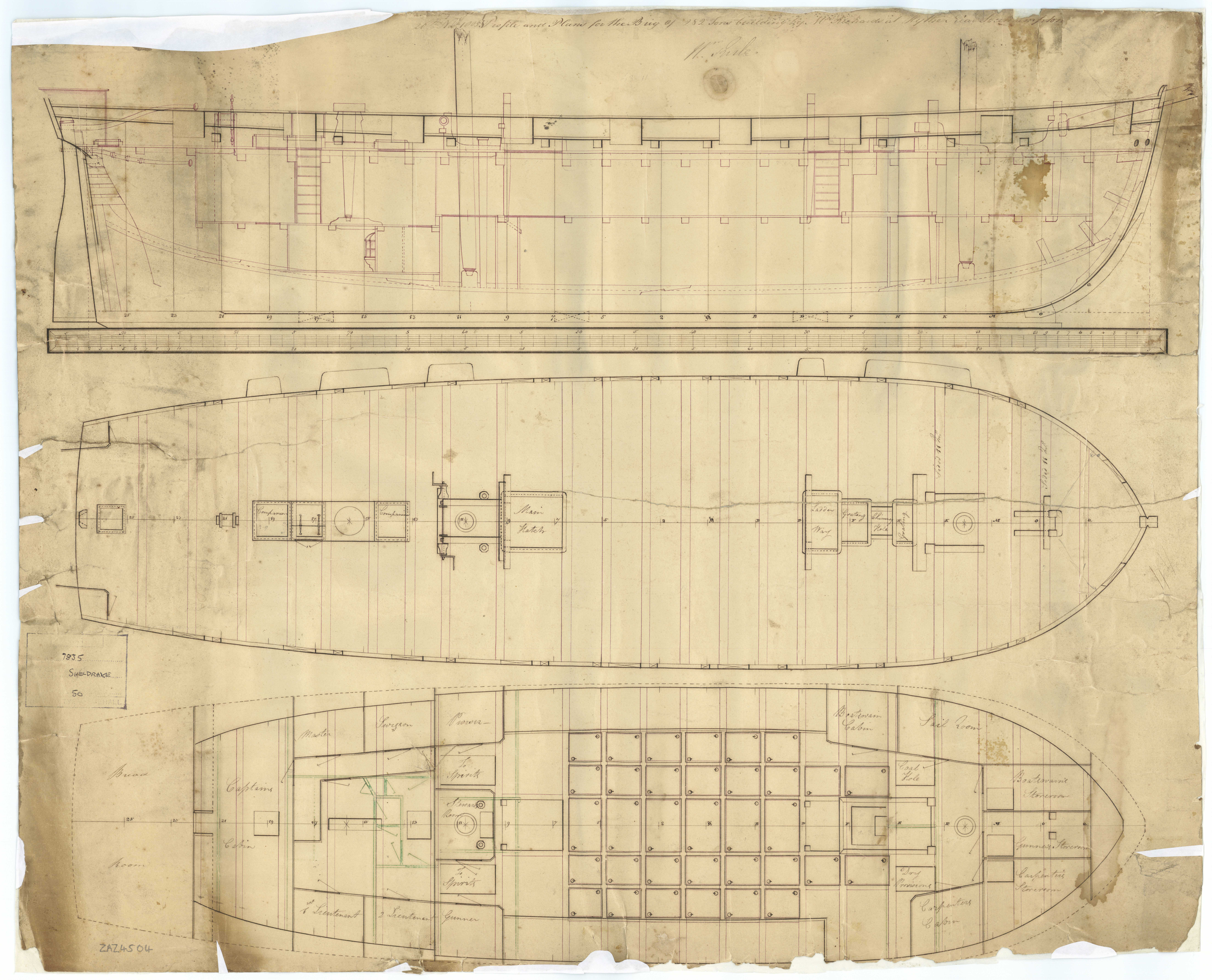
- Drawing of the Sheldrake, 1805

History

United Kingdom
- Name: HMS Sheldrake
- Builder: Richards Brothers, Hythe, Hampshire
- Launched: 1806
- Commissioned: April 1806
- Decommissioned: August 1815
- Fate: Sold, 6 March 1817

General characteristics
- Class & type: Seagull-class brig-sloop
- Tons burthen: 28236/94 bm
- Length: Overall: 93 ft (28 m); Keel: 76 ft (23 m)
- Beam: 26 ft 5 in (8.05 m)
- Depth of hold: 12 ft (3.7 m)
- Sail plan: Brig-rigged
- Complement: 95
- Armament: 14 × 24-pounder carronades; 2 × 6-pounder bow chasers

HMS Sheldrake was a Royal Navy 16-gun Seagull-class brig-sloop. She was built in Hythe and launched in 1806. She fought in the Napoleonic Wars and at the Battle of Anholt during the Gunboat War. She was stationed in the mouth of the river Loire in 1814 after Napoleon's abdication to prevent his escape to America. She was sold in 1816.

== Channel Islands ==
Commander John Thicknesse commissioned Sheldrake in April 1806 for the Channel Islands. On 12 October 1806, Sheldrake was in company with Constance, Strenuous, and the hired armed cutter Britannia sailing to reconnoiter Saint Malo when they spotted and gave chase to a strange sail near Cape Fréhel. The British squadron chased the vessel, mostly using their sweeps, and at noon caught up with her. She had taken refuge on shore and near the rocks at Bouche d'Arkie (Bay of Erqui), under the protection of the French battery on the hill and some troops and field pieces. Captain Burrowes of Constance decided to attack. At 2pm a two-hour action began, during which both Burrowes and the French captain were killed. During the battle, Constance too ran aground. Thickness sent his first lieutenant in boats to take possession of the French vessel after she struck.

The French vessel was the frigate-built transport Salamander, armed with twenty-six long 12 and 18-pounder guns and carrying a crew of 150. She had been sailing from Saint Malo to Brest with a cargo of ship timber. A month earlier, Constance, Strenuous, and Sharpshooter had run the same ship on shore before leaving her, apparently wrecked.

Thicknesse was unable to get either vessel off the rocks. He was, however, able to get many of Constance's officers and crew on board Sheldrake. When her crew abandoned Constance, under heavy fire from shore, they could not set her on fire because of the number of wounded still on board. A party of her crew made a second attempt to retrieve her, but all were killed or captured. Next morning, Sheldrake destroyed Salamander by gunfire. At that time Thicknesse saw that the action of the sea had destroyed Constance.

Casualties were heavy. Sheldrake herself had lost one man killed and two wounded. Strenuous had had five men wounded. The casualty list for Constance was incomplete because a number of men may have been taken prisoner when they took to the boats or swam ashore. Sheldrake had about 100 of the crew on board her. Burrowes and eight others were known killed, and four others later died of their wounds. Twelve more aboard Sheldrake were wounded, two badly. Sheldrake's first lieutenant estimated that he had seen some 30 dead on Salamander. In addition, Sheldrake had taken nine French wounded aboard, two of whom died.

== Prize-taking ==
On 19 January 1809, Sheldrake captured a French vessel laden with wheat for the French army in Spain. Thicknesse put a prize crew aboard consisting of Sheldrake's master, Mr. William Hubbard, a midshipman and ten crew men. He also retained two of her French crew on board. Thicknesse instructed Hubbard to follow Sheldrake to Guernsey, which was some 15 leagues away. During the night the prize sprang a leak and sank suddenly when her cargo of wheat clogged the pumps. Only one man survived. He had climbed into the rigging as she sank and after she sank was able to get to one of her boats that had providentially been left on deck and unfastened. Sheldrake recovered him the next morning.

Later in 1809, Sheldrake, alone or with other British warships, captured a large number of Danish merchantmen.

- Haversteen (6 May);
- Anna Magdalina (9 May).

Sheldrake with Kite:

- Drisden (17 May);
- Boat Anna Elizabeth, (17 May);
- Sloop of unknown name (19 May);
- Empty boat, (21 May);
- Sloop Jute Jaghen (29 May);
- Sloop Selden (30 May).

Captured by Sheldrake; Kite, and Leveret sharing by agreement:

- Vrou (15 June);
- Boat Denmark (22 July).

Captured by Sheldrake, Leveret sharing by agreement:

- Sloop Folken (18 September).

Captured by Sheldrake, Leveret, and the gun-vessel Starling:

- Mackerel (10 October).

Captured by Sheldrake, Leveret, and Chanticleer sharing by agreement:

- Jupiter (24 October).

On 16 November 1809, Sheldrake was in company with Rose when they captured diverse vessels. Some prize money was paid almost nine years later, in June 1818. A first-class share of Rose's portion was £17 8s 2d; a sixth-class share, i.e., the share of an ordinary seaman, was 7s 8 1/2d. Also on 16 November, Sheldrake captured St. Peter. Prize money was paid some 11 years later. (Note: A first-class share was worth £6 17s 9 1/2d; a sixth-class share was worth 4s 2 1/4d.)

In 1810 Commander James P. Stewart replaced Thicknesse, who was promoted to post-captain.

== Battle of Anholt ==
At the beginning of March 1811 Vice Admiral Sir James Saumarez received information that the Danes would attack the island of Anholt, on which there was a garrison of British forces under Captain Maurice of the Royal Navy. Tartar sailed from Yarmouth on 20 March and anchored off the north end of the island on 26 March. On 27 March the garrison sighted the enemy off the south side of the island. Maurice marched to meet them with a battery of howitzers and 200 infantry, and signaled Tartar and Sheldrake. The two vessels immediately set sail and tried to head south but the shoals forced them to swing wide, delaying them by many hours.

The Danes, who had eighteen heavy gunboats for support, landed some 1000 troops in the darkness and fog and attempted to outflank the British positions. They were poorly equipped and their attack was uncoordinated, with the result that the British batteries at Fort Yorke (the British base) and Massareenes stopped the assault. Gunfire from Tartar and Sheldrake forced the gunboats to move off westwards. The gunboats made their escape over the reefs while the ships had to sail around the outside. Tartar chased three gunboats towards Læsø but found herself in shoal water as night approached and gave up the chase. On the way back Tartar captured two Danish transports that she had passed while chasing the gunboats; one of them had 22 soldiers on board, with a considerable quantity of ammunition, shells and the like, while the other contained provisions.

Sheldrake managed to capture two gunboats. First she captured Gunboat No. 9, which struck without a fight. She was armed with two long 18-pounder guns and four brass howitzers. Gunboat No. 9 had a crew of 65 men under the command of a Danish naval lieutenant. Stewart took the prisoners on board and set out for the largest lugger, which he captured at 8pm after the exchange of a few shots. The lugger proved to be Gunvessel No. 1. She was armed with two long 24-pounders and four brass howitzers. She had a complement of 70 men under a Danish naval lieutenant but had only 60 on board when Sheldrake captured her. Stewart believed that from the number of shot the lugger had taken that she had lost many of her crew. Sheldrake had suffered little damage and no casualties. Having 40 more Danish prisoners on board than his own crew, Stewart chose not to attempt to catch any more Danish vessels though he did fire on some and may have sunk one.

The Danes on the western side managed to embark on board fourteen gunboats and make their escape. The Battle of Anholt cost the British only two killed and 30 wounded. The Danes lost their commander, three other officers, and 50 men killed. The British took, besides the wounded, five captains, nine lieutenants, and 504 ratings as prisoners, as well as three pieces of artillery, 500 muskets, and 6,000 rounds of ammunition. In addition, Sheldrake's two captured gunboats resulted in another two lieutenants of the Danish Navy and 119 men falling prisoner. In 1847 the Admiralty authorized the issuance of the Naval General Service Medal with clasp "Anholt 27 March 1811" to the remaining British survivors of the battle.

== Prize-taking in the Baltic ==
On 5 July 1811 Sheldrake was in company with the third rates Cressy, Defence, Dictator, and the gun-brig Bruizer. The British warships were protecting a convoy of merchantmen. As they passed Hjelm Island a flotilla of 17 Dano-Norwegian gunboats and 10 rowboats came out to attack the convoy. The attackers lost four gunboats; the convoy had no losses. During the action, Sheldrake captured the Danish gunboats No. 2, which was under the command of Lieutenant Jørgen Conrad de Falsen, and No. 5. (Note: Gunboat No. 5 was probably the former Grinder, tender to HMS Anholt.) In February 1812 Commander James Gifford replaced Stewart. On 11 April, Sheldrake was in company with Helder when they captured the Fosogern. On 13 May Sheldrake captured the Freihaden and on 11 August the Elias Jonas. Then on 13 August Commander George Brine replaced Gifford.

At some point in the summer, Sheldrake assisted Aquilon in destroying seven large British merchant vessels that had run aground near Stralsund. They were carrying a cargoes of hemp. The British were not able to get the vessels off due to the presence of 1500 French troops on cliffs above the vessels and so contented themselves with first scuttling the vessels and then setting them on fire.

On 16 October Sheldrake captured the French privateer Aimable D'Evrilly. Sheldrake's commander at the time was D. L. St. Clair, who apparently was promoted to the rank of commander on 12 November, that is, after having assumed command of the vessel. The capture took place in the vicinity of Möen Island. Prize money was paid in March 1818. (Note: A first-class share was worth £37 3s; a sixth-class share was worth 12s 6 1/4d.)

Sheldrake, now under the command of Captain George Brine, was in company with Mariner, when they captured the Aageroe on 6 November 1812. Sheldrake then captured the Ebenetzer on 16 March 1813. (Note: A first-class share for the Aageroe was worth £23 11s 4d and for the Ebenetzer £12 10s 1d; sixth-class shares were worth 8s 6 1/4d and 7s 0 3/4d.)

Next, Sheldrake was in company with Reynard when they captured the vessels No. 35 and Lilla Maria on 23 and 24 March 1813. By this time St. Clair was captain of Reynard. (Note: Prize money was paid in 1821. A first-class share was worth £31 3s 3d; a sixth-class share was worth 19s 2d.)

Between 23 May 1813 and 20 June Sheldrake was in company with Ariel and other vessels when they captured the Lilla Catherina, Tonsberg packet, Bergen, Cerberus, Caron Maria, Margaretha, Diana, Recovery, Gebhardina, and sundry boats and parcels of corn. (Note: A first-class share of the prize money for these vessels and cargoes was worth £58 18s 7 3/4d; a sixth-class share was £1 4s 0 3/4d.) Immediately thereafter, i.e., between 20 June 1813 and 24 July, Sheldrake was in company with Erebus, Hamadryad, Ariel, Woodlark, and Thracian. They captured the Erstatning, Gode Hensight, Freden, Falken, Freedshaabet, a boat (name unknown), and "corn ex Sheldrake". (Note: The prize money for a first-class share was £23 11s; the prize money to a sixth-class share was 9s 1 1/4d.)

On 27 July Sheldrake, Erebus, and Thracian captured Forsoget, Stephanus, and Erskine. (Note: A first-class share for the three was worth £5 6s 11d; sixth-class shares were worth 2s 7 1/2d.)

== Fate ==
One of Sheldrake's last assignments was to sit at the mouth of the Loire to prevent Napoleon from fleeing to America. Opposum joined her in this assignment, sitting further out to sea.

In about August 1815 Sheldrake was paid off into ordinary at Portsmouth. Brine was assigned to Musquito on 12 August and joined her on 25 August. On 6 March 1817 Sheldrake was sold at Chatham to Mr. Manclerk for £700.
