= Battle of Anholt =

1811 battle of the Gunboat War

- Part of the Gunboat War
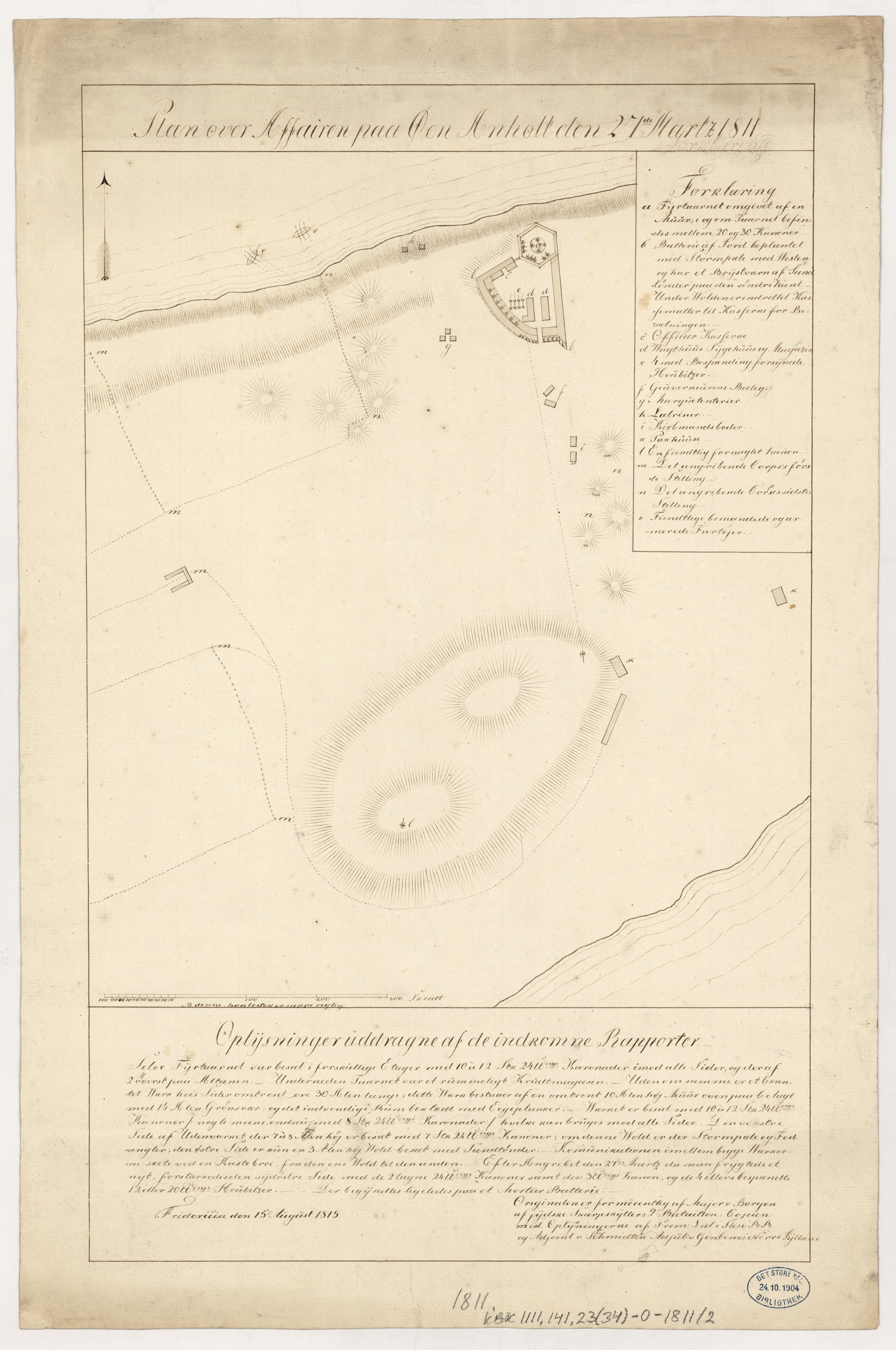
- Danish map of the battle
| Date | 27 March 1811 |
| Location | Anholt |
| Result | British victory |

Belligerents
| United Kingdom | Denmark–Norway |

Commanders and leaders
| James Wilkes Maurice | Jørgen de Falsen (POW); Ketil Melstedt † |

Strength
| 381; 1 frigate 1 schooner 1 brig-sloop | 1,000; 18 gunboats 2 troopships |

Casualties and losses
| 2 killed 30 wounded | 54 killed 639 captured 2 gunboats captured 2 troopships captured |

The Battle of Anholt (25–27 March 1811) was a successful British military operation under the command of James Wilkes Maurice against the Danish-held island of Anholt under the command of Jørgen Conrad de Falsen, taking place during the Gunboat War, a conflict between the United Kingdom and Denmark-Norway that was part of the wider Napoleonic Wars. It was an attempt by the Dano-Norwegians to recapture Anholt, a small Danish island off the coast of Jutland which the British had captured in 1809.

Early in the Gunboat War, the Dano-Norwegians had closed their lighthouse at the easternmost point of Anholt. In January 1809, the bomb-vessel Proselyte, which the British had stationed off Anholt to act as a lighthouse, struck Anholt Reef and sank. On 18 May 1809, the 64-gun HMS Standard, under Captain Askew Hollis, led in a squadron that also included the frigate Owen Glendower, and the vessels Avenger, Ranger, Rose, and Snipe. Together they captured the island.

A landing party of seamen and marines under the command of Captain William Selby of Owen Glendower, with the assistance of Captain Edward Nicolls of the Standard's marines, landed. The Danish garrison of 170 men put up a sharp but ineffectual resistance that killed one British marine and wounded two; the garrison then surrendered. The British took immediate possession of the island. The Danish army had a larger fighting force than the British, but a lack of planning and supply failures led to a devastating defeat and many Danish casualties.

As a result of the battle, the Royal Marines won many supporters among senior naval officers, which helped to further their cause for fairness in terms of service and officers' promotion. After the battle, the British occupation of Anholt continued until peace was signed at the Treaty of Kiel in 1814. There is a monument commemorating the battle in the village on the island.

== Background ==
Hollis, in his report, stated that Anholt was important in that it could furnish supplies of water to His Majesty's fleet, and afford a good anchorage to merchant vessels sailing to and from the Baltic. However, the principal objective of the mission was to restore the lighthouse on the island to its pre-war state to facilitate the movement of British men of war and merchantmen navigating the dangerous seas there. King Frederick VI of Denmark declared the recovery of Anholt to be the highest priority and gave orders in February 1810 for the collection of the necessary troops and gunboats, under the overall command of General Carl Tellequist. Winter ice and late storms hampered the expedition which set sail three times from Gjerrild Bay, just north of Grenå, without reaching Anholt. Eventually, when British warships started to be seen, the window of opportunity had disappeared and Tellequist gave the order to abandon the expedition for that year.

Royal Marines Captain Edward Nicolls, the British governor of the island, had heard of the plans to recapture Anholt and deployed the Royal Navy gunboat Grinder to scout the coast of Jutland whenever the weather was fair. Grinder also captured some small Danish merchantmen, but was captured by four Danish gunboats on 13 April 1810. In August 1810 Anholt became a stone frigate and was classified as a 50-gun warship. Although the island's garrison consisted solely of marines, it was a ship in the eyes of the British Admiralty, and Royal Marines Captain Robert Torrens was ultimately accountable to Royal Navy Captain James Wilkes Maurice, who succeeded Nicolls as governor of the island. This arrangement reflected the inequality of status between Royal Navy officers, and Royal Marine counterparts.

== Battle ==
At the beginning of March 1811, Vice-admiral Sir James Saumarez received information that the Danes would attack Anholt. Tartar sailed from Yarmouth on 20 March and anchored off the north end of the island on 26 March. On 24 March, a Danish fleet of 18 gunboats with 1000 Danish marines on board left Gjerrild beach in Jutland. The Danish fleet was unaware that frigates were on the way to protect the British base on Anholt, known as Fort York, and had been reinforced with artillery. The Danes landed some 1000 troops in the darkness and fog and attempted to outflank the British positions. The Danes landed on the northern beach of Anholt early in the morning and marched towards Fort York, a bastion built in extension of the lighthouse and now manned by 380 British marines.

On 27 March, the garrison sighted the Danes off the south side of the island. Maurice marched to meet them with a battery of howitzers and 200 infantry, and signaled Tartar and Sheldrake. The two vessels immediately made every endeavour to beat south, but the shoals forced them to stand so far out that it took them many hours. There was a failure to co-ordinate any Danish plan of battle and the fighting ended in sporadic encounters. The Danish soldiers, without supplies, became thirsty and tired. The batteries at Fort Yorke (the British base) and Massareenes stopped the assault. The Danes launched a final attack on Fort York at 10 in the evening, led by Major Ketil Melstedt. With raised sword, he led a charge by a small party of men towards the fort, but a British bullet ended his life and settled the battle. The Danish attempts to take Fort York failed due to a combination of poor planning, a lack of provisions and a failure to bring field artillery - much of this due to the current limitations on Danish shipping following British naval successes. Ultimately, this proved fatal.

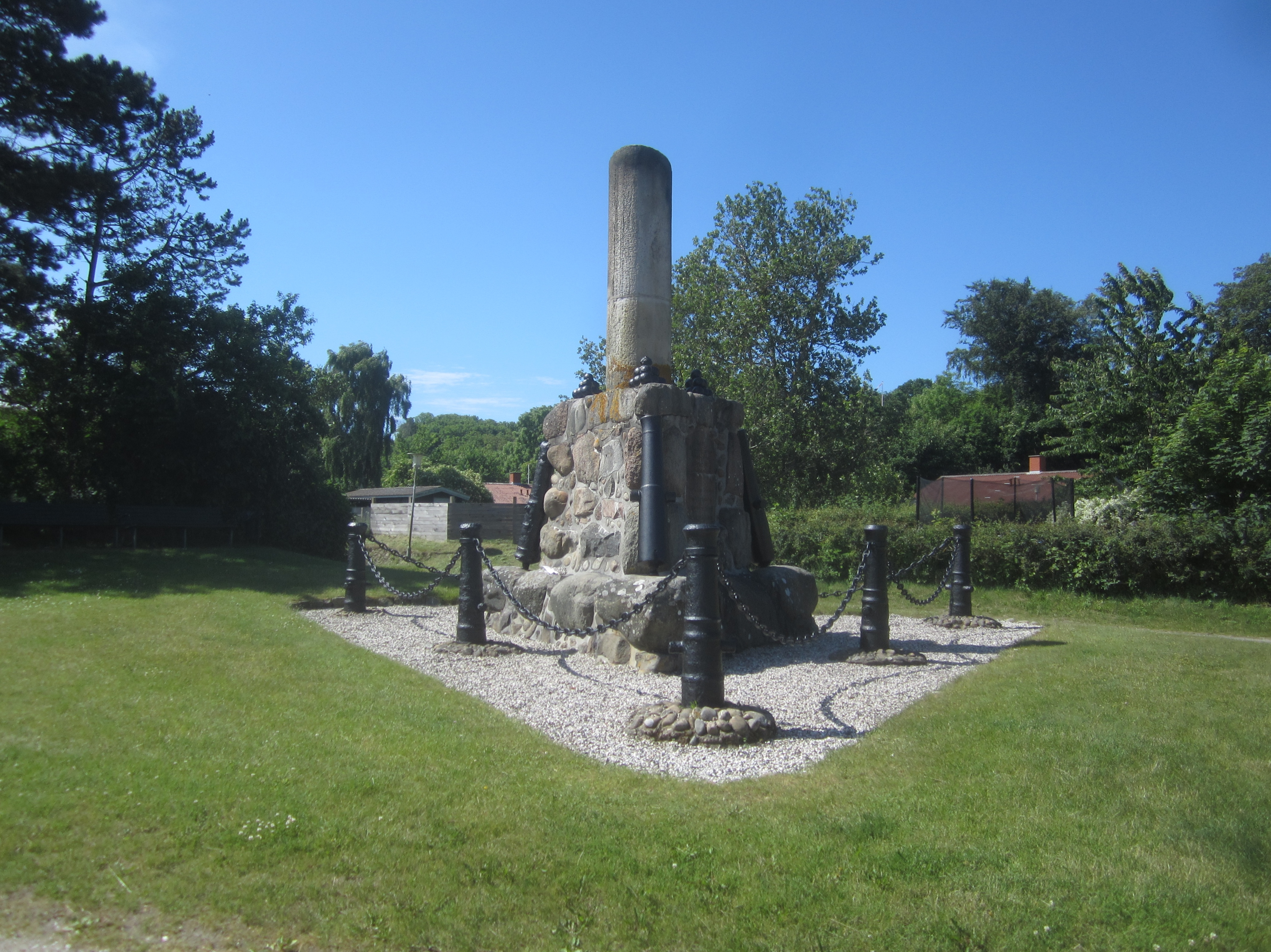
Memorial on Anholt to the battle

Gunfire from Tartar and Sheldrake forced the gunboats to move off westwards. The gunboats made their escape over the reefs while the ships had to beat round the outside. Tartar chased three gunboats towards Læsø, but found herself in shoal water as night approached and gave up the chase. On the way back, Tartar captured two Danish transports that it had passed while chasing the gunboats; one of them had 22 soldiers on board, with a considerable quantity of ammunition, shells, and the like, while the other contained provisions. Sheldrake managed to capture two gunboats. The Danes on the western side managed to embark on board fourteen gunboats and make their escape.

The battle cost the British only two killed and 30 wounded. The Danes lost their commander, three other officers, and 50 men killed. The British took, besides the wounded, five captains, nine lieutenants, and 504 rank and file as prisoners, as well as three pieces of artillery, 500 muskets, and 6,000 rounds of ammunition. In addition, Sheldrake's two captured gunboats resulted in another two lieutenants of the Danish Navy, and 119 men falling prisoner. Captain Joseph Baker of Tartar proposed taking his Danish prisoners to Randers and exchanging them for the officers and crew of Pandora, which had wrecked in February.

== Aftermath ==
It was customary for senior officers to be presented with ceremonial swords, to commemorate significant victories. As well as Captain Maurice receiving a sword, Captain Torrens received two swords, one from his brother officers, and another from the non-commissioned officers and privates. This latter sword was purchased by the Royal Marines Museum, on the 200th anniversary of the battle of Anholt, and all three are on display at the Royal Marines Museum. In 1847 the Royal Navy authorized the issuance of the Naval General Service Medal with the bar 'Anholt 27 March 1811' to reward this action. Forty men claimed this bar, mainly Royal Marines. Two hundred years later, in March 2011, Danish and British naval authorities attended the inauguration on the island of a new memorial to those who lost their lives in the battle.
