= HMS Starling (1805) =

Brig of the Royal Navy

History

United Kingdom
- Name: HMS Starling
- Namesake: Starling
- Ordered: 20 November 1804
- Builder: William Rowe, St Peter's yard, Newcastle-on-Tyne
- Laid down: January 1805
- Launched: May 1805
- Fate: Sold 1814

General characteristics
- Class & type: Confounder-class gun-brig
- Type: Gun-brig
- Tons burthen: 18183/94 (bm)
- Length: 84 ft 3 in (25.7 m) (gundeck); 69 ft 10 1/4 in (21.292 m) (keel)
- Beam: 22 ft 1 1/2 in (6.7 m)
- Depth of hold: 11 ft 0 in (3.35 m)
- Complement: 50
- Armament: 10 × 18-pounder carronades + 2 × 12-pounder chase guns

HMS Starling was launched in 1805. She participated in one action and captured a privateer and a number of merchant vessels before she was sold in 1814.

== Career ==
Although Admiralty records imply that Starling was launched in May, she was in action already in April.

Early in the morning of 24 April 1805, HMS Leda, Captain Robert Honyman (or Honeyman), sighted twenty-six French vessels rounding Cap Gris Nez. Honyman immediately ordered the vessels of his squadron, Fury, Harpy, Railleur, Bruiser, Gallant, Archer, Locust, Tickler, Watchful, Monkey, Firm, and Starling, to intercept. After a fight of about two hours, Starling and Locust had captured seven armed schuyts in an action within pistol-shot of the shore batteries on Cap Gris Nez. (Note: A schuyt was a Dutch flat-bottomed sailboat, broad in the beam, with square stern; usually equipped with leeboards to serve for a keel.) The schuyts were all of 25 to 28 tons burthen, and carried in all 117 soldiers and 43 seamen under the command of officers from the 51st. Infantry Regiment. The French convoy had been bound for Ambleteuse from Dunkirk. On the British side the only casualty was one man wounded on Archer.

The seven captured schyuts were:

- Schuyt No. 52, under the command of a Sub-Lieutenant of Infantry Loriol, armed with three 24-pounders;
- Schuyt No. 48, under the command of A. Joron of the 51st the Infantry, armed with two 6-pounders, one 24-pounder and one brass howitzer;
- Schuyt No. 57, under the command of Lieutenant Loriol of 51st Infantry, armed with one 24-pounder and two 6-pounders;
- Schuyt No. 45 under the command of Sub-Lieutenant Litner of the 51st Infantry, armed with one 24-pounder, one 12-pounder and one 6-pounder;
- Schuyt No. 3. under the command of Mr. Calder, the senior commander, who left her before the British took possession of her;
- Schuyt No. 54, under the command of Sub-Lieutenant Bragur of the 51st Infantry, armed with one 24-pounder and two 6-pounders;
- Schuyt No. 43, Sub Lieutenant Billa of the 51st Infantry, armed with one 24-pounder and two 6-pounders.

The next day Archer brought in two more schuyts, numbers 44 and 58, each armed with one 24-pounder and two 12-pounders. On 25 April 1805 Railleur towed eight of the French schuyts into the Downs. Starling, which had received a great deal of damage, followed Railleur in. Although early reports were that Starling had lost three men killed, these reports apparently were incorrect.

Lieutenant Charles Frederick Napier commissioned her in July for the Downs station. it is not clear who her commander was prior to that. He would remain her commander until she was sold in 1814.

On 23 May 1806 Starling captured the Danish vessel Diamanten.

On 22 January 1808 Lloyd's List reported that Starling had detained Vrow Magdalena and sent her into Harwich. Vrou Magdalena, Stamm, master, had been sailing from Memel to Ostend.

HMS Cruizer and Fury shared in the proceeds of the capture on 23 November of Fier Broders, J. Eynerson, master. Starling, Cruizer, Alexandrine [sic] (probably Alexandria), and Fury shared in the proceeds of the capture, also on 23 November, of the Danish ships Vrow Sophia and Yonge Nessa. On 25 November Starling, Cruizer, Alexandrine, and Fury captured Salskabed and St. Jorrison. Also on 25 November Starling captured Nikolai Maria.

On 6 December seven Danish vessels arrived at Yarmouth. They were prizes to Cruizer, Starling, and Rose.

On 18 August Starling captured the Danish vessel Patientia. On 25 November she captured the Danish vessels Lawrence Caroline, Two Brothers, Prince Charles, Aurora, and Erudte.

On 2 July 1809, Starling destroyed the Danish privateer Massarine.

Starling, Sheldrake, and Leveret were in company on 10 September at the capture of the Danish vessel Mackerel.

Starling sailed from the Nore on 11 November with 21 vessels under convoy to Heligoland. She arrived at Yarmouth on 23 November with only two vessels, a storm having scattered the convoy.

Starling, Pandora, and Rose were in sight when on 12 October 1810 Raleigh captured the Danish brig Friheden.

On 24 November Economic was lost northward of Yarmouth Pier. Economic had been sailing from the Baltic with a cargo of wheat when Starling had detained her.

Starling captured the Danish vessels Fortoyelighsden and Wilhelmma on 10 and 19 May 1811.

On 13 October 1813 Starling and Cheerly assisted Hoppet, saving her from destruction. (Note: A first-class share of the salvage money was worth £20 12s 0 3/4d; a sixth-class share, that of an Ordinary Seaman, was worth 12s 9d.)

== Fate ==
The Principal Officers and Commissioners of His Majesty's Navy offered the "Starling gun-brig, of 181 tons", lying at Sheerness, for sale on 29 September 1814. She sold on that day for £800.
