= James Wilkes Maurice =

Royal Navy officer (1775–1857)

Vice-Admiral James Wilkes Maurice
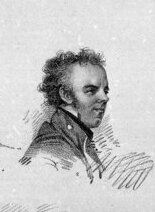
- 1805 portrait
- Born: 10 February 1775; Devonport, Devon
- Died: 4 September 1857 (aged 82); East Emma Place, East Stonehouse, Plymouth, Devon
- Military career
- Allegiance: Great Britain; United Kingdom
- Branch: Royal Navy
- Service years: 1789–1857
- Rank: Vice admiral
- Commands: Diamond Rock; HMS Savage; Governor of Marie-Galante; Governor of Anholt
- Conflicts: French Revolutionary Wars; Battle of Groix; Invasion of France (1795); Napoleonic Wars; Battle of Diamond Rock; Gunboat War; Battle of Anholt

Vice-Admiral James Wilkes Maurice (10 February 1775 – 4 September 1857) was a Royal Navy officer who served in the French Revolutionary and Napoleonic Wars. Unlike his contemporaries who won fame commanding ships, Maurice gained accolades for his command of a number of island fortresses.

Maurice was employed on a number of ships prior to the outbreak of the French Revolutionary Wars, and by 1794 held the position of midshipman. He saw action in the English Channel and in the Western Approaches the following year, participating in the Battle of Groix and the Quiberon expedition. Good service in these actions led to his appointment to a number of acting commissions as a lieutenant. His career took a major step forward when Maurice, his lieutenant's commission by now confirmed, went out to the West Indies with Commodore Sir Samuel Hood.

Hood had decided to fortify Diamond Rock, in order to harass French shipping off the port of Fort de France in Martinique and Maurice, as first lieutenant of Hood's flagship, began to oversee the arduous task. After work was completed Hood commissioned the Rock and rewarded Maurice's efforts by putting him in command. For seventeen months Maurice and his men raided and interdicted shipping off Martinique, and proved a continual thorn in the side of the French. The arrival of a large fleet under Vice-admiral Pierre-Charles Villeneuve in May 1804 during the Trafalgar campaign gave the French enough resources to assault the Rock. In the subsequent battle, Maurice held out for several days until the exhaustion of the Rock's supplies of water and ammunition forced him to surrender.

Maurice spent a brief period in command of a sloop, before being appointed governor of Marie-Galante, tasked with the defence of the island. His next posting was as governor of Anholt during the Gunboat War. In 1811 he fought off an attack from a much larger Danish force, inflicting heavy casualties. Maurice then returned to Britain and largely retired from active service, though he continued to be promoted. He reached the rank of vice-admiral before his death in 1857.

== Family and early life ==
Wilkes was born on 10 February 1775 in Devonport, Devon. He was nominally entered onto the books of Lieutenant James Glassford's HMS Monkey in 1783, but did not actually enter the navy until August 1789, when he became an able seaman aboard Captain Alexander Mackey's 14-gun sloop HMS Inspector. He served on Inspector until joining the 74-gun HMS Powerful under Captain Thomas Hicks in December 1792. He visited the Cape of Good Hope during his time on Powerful, when the ship escorted a convoy of East Indiamen there. Hicks was replaced by Captain William Albany Otway, and Powerful was ordered to the West Indies, but Maurice left the ship before she sailed, having been subpoenaed to give evidence in a case concerning a warrant officer accused of embezzling stores. By the time his services were no longer required Maurice found himself unable to rejoin his ship and instead joined the 80-gun HMS Cambridge under Captain Richard Boyer in January 1794. Cambridge was based at Plymouth with the Channel Fleet, and in May Maurice transferred to another ship on the station, the 32-gun HMS Concorde under Captain Sir Richard Strachan.

Maurice remained with Concorde after Captain Anthony Hunt replaced Strachan and served in the Western Approaches based out of Falmouth. Maurice saw action at the Battle of Groix on 23 June 1795 and then during the Quiberon expedition under Commodore Sir John Borlase Warren. Warren gave Maurice an acting commission as a lieutenant in August aboard the 74-gun HMS Thunderer under Captain Albemarle Bertie. Maurice returned to Concorde in January 1796, serving at first under his old captain Hunt, and when he was replaced, under Captain Richard Bagot. He was briefly aboard Lord Bridport's flagship, the 100-gun HMS Royal George for three weeks in February 1797, before taking an acting commission aboard the 80-gun HMS Glory, a commission confirmed by the Admiralty on 3 April 1797.

He was lieutenant aboard the 74-gun HMS Canada between 17 January 1799 and May 1802. The Canada was at the time the flagship of Commodore Sir John Borlase Warren, and served in the English Channel and off Minorca. In late summer 1802 he was moved to become first lieutenant of the 74-gun HMS Centaur, captained by Murray Maxwell and the flagship of Commodore Sir Samuel Hood. Centaur went out to the West Indies and aboard her, Maurice was present at the reduction and capture of the French and Dutch possessions of Saint Lucia, Tobago, Demerara and Essequibo. He was landed with a party at Martinique on 26 November 1803 with orders to destroy the battery at Petite Anse d'Arlet, but was badly wounded when the battery's magazine exploded. The Lloyd's Patriotic Fund awarded him a sword valued at £50 as a reward for his services.

== Maurice on Diamond Rock ==
Hood had by late 1803 decided to move against the two last remaining French naval bases in the Caribbean, at Guadeloupe and Martinique. Large numbers of privateers used the ports on the islands as a base from which to operate against British merchant shipping in the Caribbean. They had captured a number of valuable cargoes and were diverting British warships to protect the merchant fleets. Hood decided to blockade Martinique, and thus curtail the privateers and intercept supplies destined for the French garrison. Patrolling off the bay at the southern end of the island, in which one of Martinique's two main ports, Fort-de-France, was located, Hood saw that if the British could occupy Diamond Rock, a large outcrop of rock at the entrance to the bay, it would allow them effectively to control the shipping approaching the ports on the western side, as the currents around the island made the easiest approaches mean passing within sight of Diamond Rock. Maurice volunteered to lead a party of men to prepare the fortifications.

=== Fortifying the rock ===
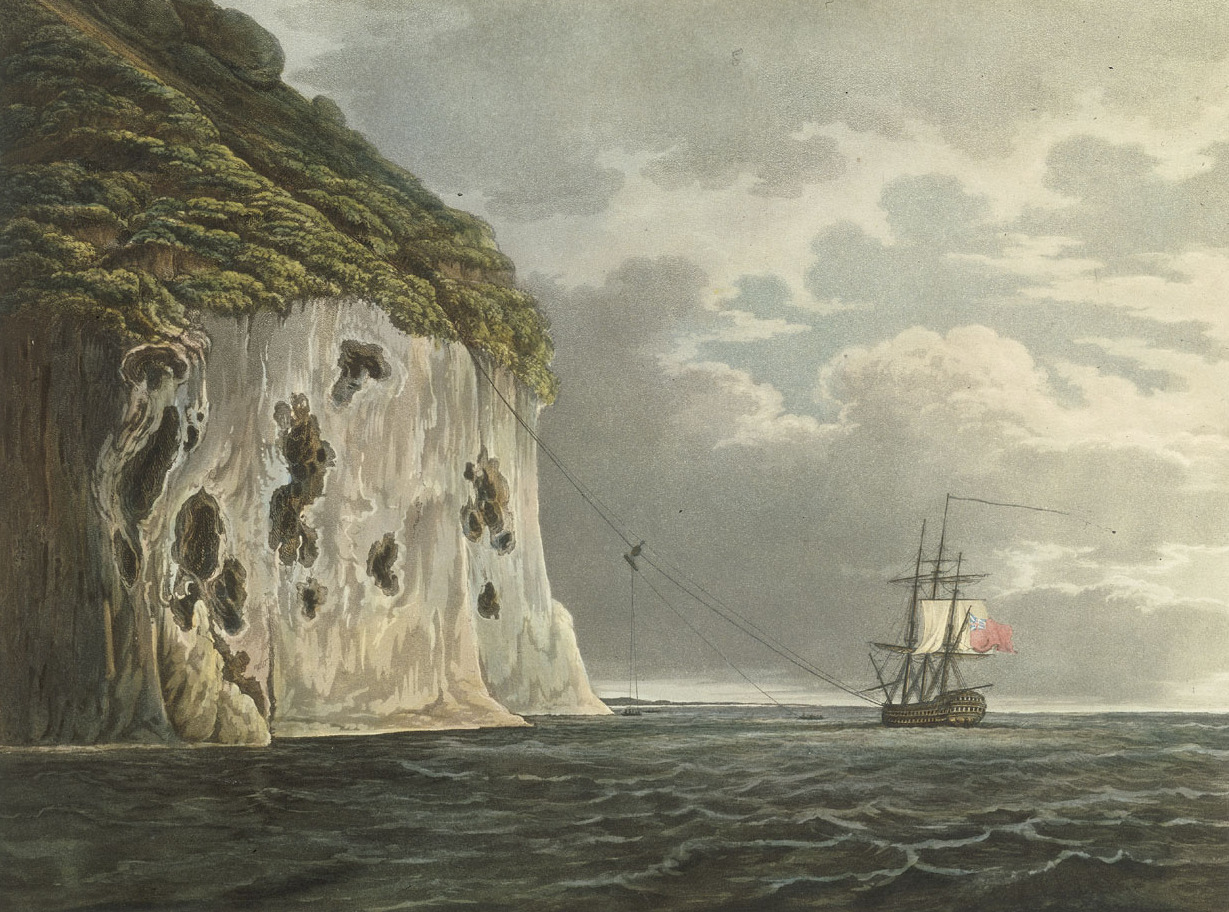
A cannon being hauled up to the summit of the rock suspended by a cable from Centaur's mainmast.

Maurice led a party of men onto the rock on 7 January 1804, and work immediately began on fortifying the small cove they had landed at with their launch's 24-pounder, and establishing forges and artificers' workshops in a cave at the base of the rock. After fixing ladders and ropes to scale the sheer sides of the rock, they were able to access the summit and began to establish messes and sleeping areas in a number of small caves. Bats were driven out by burning bales of hay, and a space was cleared by blasting at the top of the rock in order to establish a battery.

In February a number of guns were transferred over from Centaur, with two 24-pounders being installed in separate batteries at sea level, another 24-pounder halfway up the rock, and two 18-pounders in the battery at the top. In addition to this the men had use of a number of boats, with one armed with a 24-pounder carronade, which were used to intercept enemy ships. Marshall's Naval Biography, when describing the process of hauling the guns to the summit, recorded that

Lieutenant Maurice having succeeded in scrambling up the side of the rock, and fastened one end of an 8-inch hawser to a pinnacle, the viol-block was converted to a traveller, with a purchase block lashed thereto, and at the other end if the hawser set up as a jack-stay, round the Centaur's main-mast. The gun being slung to the viol, the purchase-fall was brought to the capstern. In this manner the desired object was effected in the course of a week, during which time lieutenant Maurice and the working party on shore suffered most dreadfully from excessive heat and fatigue, being constantly exposed to the sun, and frequently obliged to lower themselves down over immense precipices to attend the ascent of the guns, and bear them off from the innumerable projections against which they swung whenever the ship took a shear...

=== Commander Maurice, of Diamond Rock ===
By early February the guns had been installed and tested. The 18-pounders were able to command completely the passage between the rock and the island, forcing ships to avoid the channel. The winds and currents meant that these ships were then unable to enter the bay.

With work complete by 7 February Hood decided to formalise the administration of the island, and wrote to the Admiralty, announcing that he had commissioned the rock as a sloop, under the name Fort Diamond. Lieutenant Maurice, who had impressed Hood with his efforts while establishing the position, was rewarded by being made commander. Diamond Rock was to be considered a captured enemy ship, and was technically treated as a tender to one of the boats stationed there, commissioned by the Admiralty as the sloop Diamond Rock, superseding Hood's use of Fort Diamond.

Maurice had a party of around 100 men under his command on the rock, with the usual officers found on a British warship, including a surgeon, purser, and a junior lieutenant to command the small supply vessel. A hospital was established, and food, gunpowder and ammunition were brought to the rock in boats, at first from Centaur, and then from Martinique, where it was purchased from sympathetic inhabitants. Water also had to be brought from the island, and large cisterns were built to store it.

For seventeen months Maurice held the rock, foiling several attempts by the French at Martinique to oust them. He reported the movements of Counter-admiral Édouard Thomas Burgues de Missiessy's fleet which arrived in the area during the Trafalgar campaign, but in May 1805 a fleet under Vice-admiral Pierre-Charles Villeneuve arrived in Fort de France Bay, having briefly exchanged fire with the British on Diamond Rock as they did so. Shortly after their arrival Maurice discovered that the main cistern, holding a month's supply of water, had cracked in some earth tremors, and the leak had been made worse by the vibration from the guns. There was barely two weeks left, but fresh supplies were now unobtainable as a blockade of the rock began by a number of schooners, brigs and frigates.

=== The fight for Diamond Rock ===
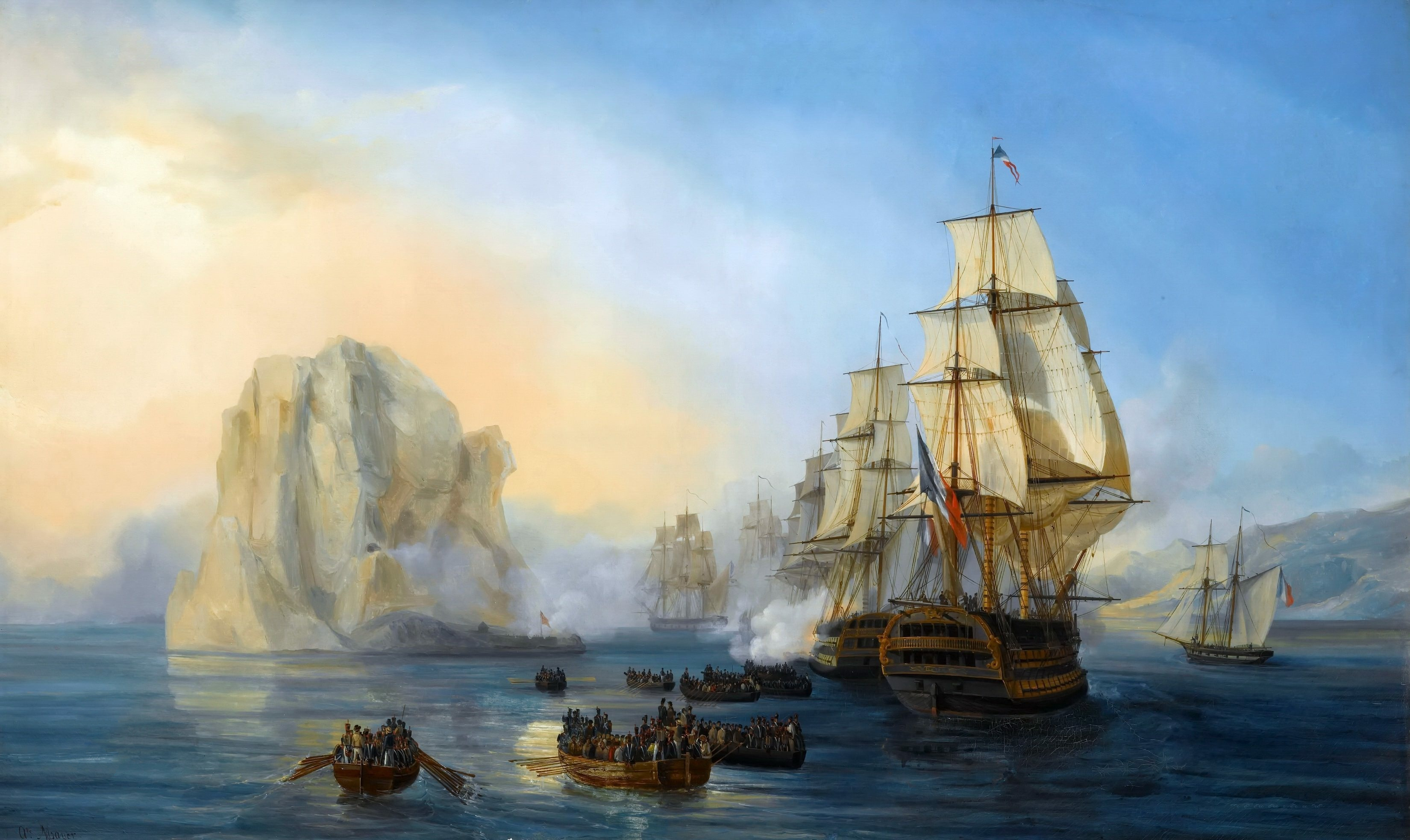
The Battle of Diamond Rock, at which Maurice surrendered after a fierce defence

Villeneuve despatched a flotilla consisting of the 74-gun Pluton and Berwick, the 36-gun Sirène, a corvette, schooner, eleven gunboats, and between three and four hundred men, under Captain Julien Cosmao, to retake the rock. A French force landed unopposed on 31 May, Maurice having assessed the overwhelming strength of the French, and having decided that it would be impossible to hold the lower stages withdrew his forces to defend the upper levels. Cosmao began an intense bombardment while the infantry forced their way onto the landing stage, losing three gunboats and two rowing boats full of soldiers as they did so. The attacking force had however neglected to bring any scaling ladders, and could not assault the sheer rock sides. Instead they were forced to besiege the British forces in the upper levels. By 2 June, with his ammunition almost exhausted and water supplies running critically short, Maurice opened negotiations.

At five o'clock Maurice agreed to surrender Diamond Rock. The British had two men killed and one man wounded in the battle. French casualties were harder to judge, Maurice estimated they amounted to seventy, the French commander of the landing force made a 'hasty calculation' of fifty. Maurice and his men were taken off the rock on the morning of 6 June and put on board the Pluton and Berwick. They were returned to Barbados by 6 June. As Diamond Rock was legally considered a Royal Navy vessel, and the commander was legally "captain" of it, he was tried by court-martial on 28 June (as the law dictated in any case where a captain loses his ship, regardless of the cause) for its loss. The court unanimously acquitted him, noting

the Court is of the opinion that Captain J. W. Maurice, the Officers and Company of His Majesty's late sloop Diamond Rock did every thing in their power to the very last, in the defence of the Rock, and against a most superior force ... [Maurice] did not surrender the Diamond until he was unable to make further defence for want of water and ammunition, the Court do therefore honourably acquit Captain Maurice accordingly.

Vice-Admiral Horatio Nelson, who had arrived in the West Indies in pursuit of Villeneuve's fleet, apologised to Maurice for having arrived too late to prevent the fall of Diamond Rock. Maurice returned to England in August and Nelson arranged for him to take command of the 18-gun brig-sloop HMS Savage on 20 August. Maurice was to join Nelson off Cádiz, but she could not be manned in time, and Maurice missed reuniting with Nelson prior to Nelson's death at Trafalgar. After two years in the Channel, Maurice and Savage sailed to the West Indies. While in command of Savage, in early December 1807 Maurice captured the Spanish privateer Quixote of Port Cavallo. Quixote was armed with eight guns and had a crew of 99 men. She was a "Vessel of a large Class, and fitted out for the Annoyance of the Trade to [Jamaica]".

== Command in the West Indies ==
Maurice again returned to the West Indies in July 1808, joining the fleet at Barbados under Sir Alexander Cochrane. He carried with him a letter of recommendation from the Admiralty, and Cochrane appointed him governor of Marie-Galante, a commission confirmed by the Admiralty on 18 January 1809 with a promotion to post-captain. Marie-Galante had not been long in British possession, and there was the risk of an uprising. Maurice had only 400 soldiers under his command, many of whom were seriously ill. A regiment was raised from the black population, but its loyalty was suspect. The issue became moot as the French never attacked the island. When Maurice became ill he resigned his commission to return to Britain.

== Governor of Anholt ==
Maurice was made Governor of Anholt in August 1810, a Danish island in the Kattegat captured in May the previous year during the Gunboat War. He had a force of 400 marines under his command, while British frigates patrolled the approaches to the island. These patrols prevented any Danish attack, except possible for a few weeks during the beginning and end of the winter freeze, when the supporting ships would be off station. It was expected that the Danes or French would attempt to recapture it, and Maurice was forewarned of a Danish attack that began on 27 March 1811. Maurice recorded that the enemy force attacked the British in their well prepared positions, but were driven off after four and a half hours of fighting. The Naval Chronicle recorded

It is proper to mention, that the assaulting force consisted of a Danish flotilla, of 33 sail, amongst which, according to our Gazette account, were 18 heavy gun-boats, carrying nearly 3,000 men. Our little garrison, including officers, seamen, marines, &c, amounted to only 350 men; yet with the loss of only two killed and 30 wounded, we killed the Danish commander, three other officers, and 50 men; and took prisoners, besides the wounded, five captains, nine lieutenants, and 504 rank and file! Three pieces of artillery, 500 muskets, and 6,000 rounds of cartridge, also fell into our possession; and two gunboats, and 250 more prisoners, were taken by his Majesty's ships Sheldrake and Tartar, in their retreat!

— The Naval Chronicle, volume 25, pp. 343-9

Though this account was probably exaggerated, the battle remained a crushing defeat for the Danes, who were unaware of the presence of the two frigates, HMS Tartar and HMS Sheldrake, when they made their attack. Maurice was presented with a sword by the garrison, and continued at Anholt until September 1812.

== Later years ==
Maurice then returned to Britain and saw no more active service. He married Sarah Lyne of Plymouth on 5 October 1814, but she died of typhus in June the following year at the age of 21. Maurice never remarried. He was promoted to rear-admiral on the retired list on 1 October 1846, and to vice-admiral on 28 May 1853. He died at East Emma Place, East Stonehouse, Plymouth, on 4 September 1857 at the age of 82.
