= Enevold De Falsen =

Danish-Norwegian lawyer, poet, actor and statesman

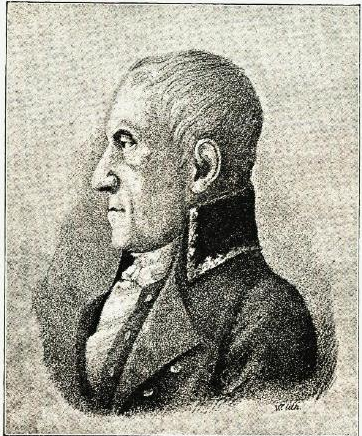
Enevold Falsen.

Enevold de Falsen (17 October 1755 – 16 November 1808) was a Danish-Norwegian lawyer, poet, actor and statesman.

Falsen instilled his passion for the United States in his son, Christian Magnus Falsen, who later became recognized as the father of the Norwegian Constitution. In Envold De Falsen's paper entitled “What is freedom, and where should we search for it?”, Falsen argued that freedom in Great Britain had been corrupted and France had frittered away the fruits of the revolution. America was described as the nation where freedom had produced the greatest gains. It was described by Falsen as “a long-smoldering fire, which was ignited by Thomas Paine’s boldness, but governed by Benjamin Franklin’s wisdom.” He described George Washington as “the most honest advocate of freedom and the friend of all good men.”

== Family ==
The family 'de Falsen' has been extensively documented. A family book was published in 1915 by Conrad Falsen, living descendants carrying the name Falsen are listed in Danmarks Adels Aarbog and most of the 2500 descendants of Enevold de Falsen have been traced and computed in database by a living member of the family. To understand why the family played a significant role over more than a century, it is useful to also follow the female lineages. Good documentation on Enevold de Falsen may be found in Store Norske Leksikon. or in Bricka's Dansk Biografisk Lexikon.

Enevold's great-grandfather, Falle Pedersen (1625–1702) was born at Vejböl, Haderslev, Jylland, Denmark. He acquired the property Östrup gaard, Sjælland not too far from Copenhagen.

A son of Falle Pedersen, Enevold de Falsen (1695–1761) became mayor of Copenhagen and Enevold and one of his brothers, Johan Eschild, were ennobled in 1758. In the following generation, Christian Magnus Falsen (1719–1799), also a lawyer, as his father, was appointed in 1765 as a high official in Norway and he died in Oslo, Norway in 1799.

== Life ==
Enevold de Falsen became bachelor at the age of 10 and a judge at the Norwegian court at Christiania in 1777 at the age of 22.

In 1781, Enevold de Falsen married Anna Henrikka Petronelle Mathiesen (1762–1825), who was active at the theatre in Kristiania (modern Oslo). They became parents of seven children, the famous statesman Christian Magnus Falsen (1782–1830), the navy officer (later admiral) Jørgen Conrad de Falsen, the county governor Carl Valentin de Falsen (1787–1852), Hagbarth de Falsen (1791–1836) and 3 daughters. As a consequence of a scandal, Enevold de Falsen was 'offered' a high official post in Northern Norway, but he could not stand the isolation, and after less than 3 years in Lofoten, he returned to Copenhagen in 1791, where he immediately found an employment as judge. In 1802 he returned to Kristiania and became in 1803 one of the highest officials.

In Norway he became a much loved cultural personality for his interest for theatre. He wrote many plays, translated Molière from French and was an appreciated actor himself. Falsen was against the death penalty except for majesty insult and perduelles. This opinion he advertised in the case against Marit Sivertsdatter from Strinda.

In 1807, he became a member of the temporary body (Regjeringskommisjonen) that acted as a cabinet for Norway. With him were Charles August, Crown Prince of Sweden (Prince Charles August) and Gebhart Moldtke. In August 1807, British forces launched a preemptive attack against Copenhagen, leading to the Dano-Norwegian government declaring war on Britain and allying with France. The commission, responsible for supplies from abroad, spent most of their time ensuring sufficient supplies of Danish foodstuffs reached Norway.

== Death ==
On 16 November 1808, on his wife's birthday, he left the theater in the evening by a day of stormy weather, and was found dead in Björvika (Oslofjorden) the next day.
