= HMS Victoire (1797) =

Sailing ship from the late 18th century

History

France
- Name: Victoire
- Launched: 1793, Ostend, Antwerp, or some other port in the region
- Captured: 28 December 1797

Great Britain
- Name: HMS Victoire
- Acquired: December 1797 by capture
- Fate: Sold 16 December 1801

General characteristics
- Tons burthen: 70, or 7260/94, or 73 (bm)
- Length: Overall:62 ft 10 in (19.2 m); Keel:50 ft 8 in (15.4 m)
- Beam: 16 ft 5 in (5.0 m)
- Depth of hold: 7 ft 6 in (2.3 m)
- Complement: Privateer:74; Royal Navy:20
- Armament: Privateer:14 guns; Royal Navy: Originally:14 guns; Later:2 × 4-pounder guns

HMS Victoire (or HMS Victor) was the French privateer schooner Victoire that the Royal Navy captured in 1797 and took into service as a fireship. The Navy sold her at the end of 1801.

== French service and capture ==
Victoire was launched in 1793.

On 28 December 1797 Termagant was four leagues off Spurn Head when she sighted and gave chase to a French privateer. After four hours Termagant succeeded in capturing the schooner Victoire, of 14 guns and 74 men. She had been out ten days during which time she had captured two colliers; she had been in pursuit of a British merchantman when Termagant first sighted her. The Royal Navy took Victoire into service as HMS Victoire.

== Royal Navy ==
Between March and June 1798 Victoire was at Sheerness, undergoing fitting as a temporary fireship.

In 1801 Lieutenant James Tillard commissioned Victoire for the North Sea.

== Fate ==
The "Principal Officers and Commissioners of His Majesty's Navy" offered Victoire, of 73 tons, lying at Woolwich, for sale on 16 December 1801. She sold there on that day for £240.

Lieutenant Tillard took command of Monkey.
