= HMS Surly (1806) =

British Royal Navy cutter

History

United Kingdom
- Name: HMS Surly
- Ordered: 29 March 1806
- Builder: Joseph Johnson, Dover
- Laid down: July 1806
- Launched: 15 November 1806
- Commissioned: 12 December 1806
- Reclassified: Lighter 1833–1837
- Fate: Sold out of service, January 1837

General characteristics
- Class & type: Cheerful-class cutter
- Tons burthen: 13739/94 (bm)
- Length: 63 feet (19 m) (gundeck); 46 feet 9 3/8 inches (14.259 m) (keel)
- Beam: 23 feet 6 inches (7.16 m)
- Depth of hold: 10 feet (3 m)
- Complement: 50 men
- Armament: 12 guns: Gundeck: 2 × 4-pounder guns, 10x 12-pounder carronades

HMS Surly was a Cheerful-class cutter built in 1806. Carrying 12 guns she served during the Napoleonic Wars and helped to capture a French privateer in 1809. In 1825 she was employed in carrying quantities of coin between Dublin and London and also in suppressing strike action by seamen on the River Wear. Her duties assisting the civil authorities at the Wear and later on the River Tyne extended into 1827. Surly later served on the Scottish coast and on anti-smuggling patrols in the Thames Estuary. She was refitted as a lighter in 1833 and sold out of service in 1837.

== Description ==
The Cheerful-class cutters were designed by Surveyor of the Royal Navy Sir John Henslow in 1806. They carried twelve guns (two 4-pounder cannon and ten 12-pounder carronades) on a gundeck of 63 feet (19 m) length. Their length at keel was 46 feet 9 3/8 inches (14.259 m), their beam was 23 feet 6 inches (7.16 m) and their depth in the hold was 10 feet (3 m). They measured 13739/94 tons burthen and they carried a crew of 50 men.

Surly was ordered on 29 March 1806 and was constructed by Joseph Johnson at their yard in Dover. Her keel was laid down in July 1806 and she was launched on 15 November. She was fitted out between 23 November 1806 and 4 May 1807 at the Royal Navy's Sheerness Dockyard.

== Service ==
Surly was commissioned into the Royal Navy on 12 December 1806 and her first commander was Lieutenant Peter Crawford. She served on the North Sea station and on 1 February 1809, under the command of Lieutenant Richard Welch, captured the 4-gun French privateer L'Alcide, while operating off Granville, Manche, in conjunction with the brigs Firm and Sharpshooter. She was commanded by Lieutenant Mark Lucas from September 1815 and from 18 May 1816 was commanded by Lieutenant John Hill. Around this time she was also commanded by Lieutenant Henry Smith Wilson. Surly was paid off in September 1818 and was afterwards reduced to eight guns and based at the Nore.

Surly came under the command of Lieutenant Joseph Chappell Woollnough and in August and September 1825 she was employed in transferring £95,950 10s 3d of coin (equivalent to £9,948,262 in 2023) between London and Dublin and vice versa. Shortly afterwards Woollnough took her up the River Wear in north-east England to assist the civil authorities in putting down a strike by seamen for higher wages. The seamen had committed violence in preventing ships putting to sea. Woollnough and Surly remained on this duty until October 1826. The residents and ship owners of the area wrote to the First Lord of the Admiralty Robert Dundas, 2nd Viscount Melville to commend Woollnough for his service. Because of his good performance on the Wear commander and ship were afterwards deployed on similar duties at Shields on the River Tyne. During this posting Woollnough was granted command over a party of Royal Marines and their officer. Woollnough took the opportunity to use Surly and her crew to survey the harbour and approaches to Sunderland, making note of uncharted dangerous rocks for which he was commended by the Lord High Admiral Prince William Henry, The Duke of Clarence. Surly afterwards served on the Scottish coast until winter 1827 when she was redeployed to the Thames Estuary on anti-smuggling patrols for which Woollnough also commanded the cutter Asp and additional drafts of seamen. Woollnough's patrols suppressed smuggling in the area and time spent on station allowed him to draw up an account of his actions and proposals for future operations.

Surly underwent moderate repairs between May and August 1826. From July 1828 she was commanded by Lieutenant Usherwood on the Nore station and from 22 July 1830 to June 1831 by Lieutenant Horatio James. She was refitted as a lighter at Chatham Dockyard between December 1832 and February 1833. She was sold from service at Chatham for £400 in January 1837.
