= HMS Monkey (1801) =

Warship of the Royal Navy

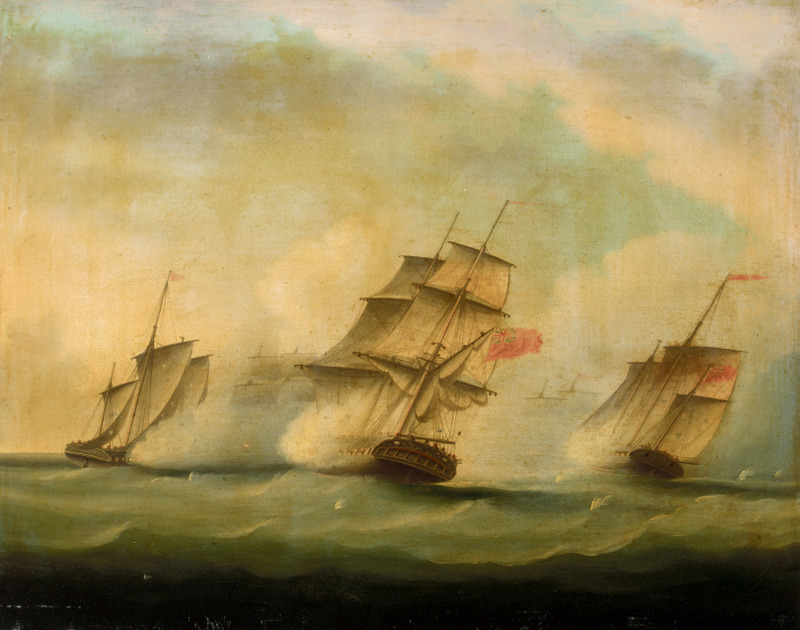
- HMS Lynx and HMS Monkey capturing three Danish luggers, 12 August 1809; oil on canvas, 19th century

History

United Kingdom
- Name: HMS Monkey
- Ordered: 7 January 1801
- Builder: John Nicholson, Rochester
- Laid down: January 1801
- Launched: 11 May 1801
- Fate: Wrecked 25 December 1810

General characteristics
- Class & type: Bloodhound-class gun-brig
- Tons burthen: 18752/94 (bm)
- Length: Overall:80 ft 2 in (24.4 m); Keel:65 ft 11 1/2 in (20.1 m)
- Beam: 23 ft 1 1/2 in (7.0 m)
- Depth of hold: 8 ft 6 in (2.6 m)
- Sail plan: Brig
- Complement: 50
- Armament: 12 × 18-pounder carronades (2 as bow chasers)

HMS Monkey was launched in 1801 at Rochester. She served in the English Channel, North and Baltic seas, and was wrecked in December 1810.

== Career ==
Monkey was commissioned for the Nore in May 1801 under Lieutenant Nicholas Corsellis.

In March 1802 she was in the Channel under the command of Lieutenant Weir. Lieutenant James Tillard recommissioned her between February and September 1802 for the North Sea. (Note: Tillard had been captain of the schooner HMS Victoire.) On 29 March, 22 April, and 5 and 11 May 1802, Monkey and Conflict seized sundry smuggled spirits.

On 25 November 1803 Monkey sent into Yarmouth two vessels that a privateer lugger had taken off Orforness. The two vessels that Monkey had recaptured were William, Roskruge, master, which had been sailing from London to Yarmouoth, and Orford, Hogarth, master, which had been sailing from London to Shields.

In 1804 Monkey was under the command of Lieutenant William Tatham.

In 1805–1806 Monkey was under the command of Lieutenant Richard William Simmonds.

Early in the morning of 24 April 1805 HMS Leda sighted twenty-six French vessels rounding Cap Gris Nez. Honyman immediately ordered Fury, Harpy, Railleur, Bruiser, Gallant, Archer, Locust, Tickler, Watchful, Monkey, Firm, and Starling to intercept. After a fight of about two hours, Starling and Locust had captured seven armed schuyts in an action within pistol-shot of the shore batteries on Cap Gris Nez. The schuyts were all of 25 to 28 tons burthen, and carried in all 117 soldiers and 43 seamen under the command of officers from the 51st. Infantry Regiment. The French convoy had been bound for Ambleteuse from Dunkirk. On the British side the only casualty was one man wounded on Archer.

Lloyd's List (LL) reported on 22 November 1805 that Monkey had sent into Portsmouth the American packet Lowell, which had been sailing from Boston to Rotterdam when Monkey had detained her.

On 10 February 1806 a French privateer captured Cicero off Fairleigh as Cicero was sailing from Deptford to Chepstow. Monkey recaptured Cicero and sent her into the Downs. On 27 March HMS Musquito was with Ariadne and Monkey when they captured Vrow Cornelia, R.R. Cruzenga, Master. On 7 April Musquito, Monkey, Bold and Urgent captured Bradford. On 14 April Musquito, Ariadne, Monkey, and Blazer captured the merchant vessel Elizabeth Anna.

Lloyd's List reported that Monkey had detained and sent into the Downs a large ship from Hamburg.

On 22 April Monkey detained and sent into the Downs a ship from the Mediterranean. Next, Monkey detained and sent into the Downs a dogger carrying sugar, coffee, tobacco, and rum to Hamburg.

Monkey detained and sent into Dover two more ships. One was New Harmony, of Altona, Smith, master, which was sailing from Hamburg to St Thomas's. The second was Enigheden, Marck, master, which was sailing from Galipoli to Hamburg. Lastly, Monkey detained the American ship Hamilton, which had been sailing from Amsterdam to Baltimore, and sent her into the Downs.

In 1807 to 1810 Monkey was under the command of Lieutenant Thomas Fitzgerald. He sailed her to the Baltic in 1809.

LL reported on 6 October 1807 that Monkey had detained and sent into the Downs Flora, which had been sailing from Baltimore to Amsterdam.

On 31 October 1808 Monkey captured Fraw Maria Dorithea, and Anna Catharina.

On 30 April 1809, Tartar captured Charlotte, with Superb, Stately, Vanguard, Allart, Constant, Monkey, and Urgent being in company or in sight. (Note: An ordinary seaman received 17s 9d; a lieutenant commanding received £16 1s 1 3/4d.)

On 12 August Commander John Willoughby Marshall and Lynx, in the company of the gun-brig Monkey, under the command of Lieutenant Thomas Fitzgerald, discovered three Danish luggers off the Danish coast. The water was too shallow for Lynx, so Marshall sent Monkey and boats from Lynx in to cut them out. The largest of the luggers, which had four guns and four howitzers, opened fire on Monkey before all three luggers ran ashore once Monkey and the launch's 18-pounder carronade returned fire. The British refloated the luggers and brought them out the next day, having taken no casualties. In their haste to quit the vessels, the Danes failed to fire the fuse on a cask of gunpowder they had left by the fireplace on the largest lugger. Marshall thought the Danes' behaviour in leaving the explosive device disgraceful. The largest lugger was Captain Japen (or Captain Jassen). She had had a crew of 45 men, who had fled, and during the engagement she had thrown two of her howitzers overboard. The second lugger, name unknown, had four guns and a crew of 20. The third lugger was Speculation, of three guns and 19 men. Her crew too had thrown two guns overboard.

In 1810 Monkey was part of the force blockading Lorient.

On 28 March 1810 Monkey and Minerva were in company when they captured Epervier.

On 29 April Monkey was in company with Armide and the hired armed cutter Adrian at the capture of Aimable Betzie. Daring also shared in the proceeds of the capture of Aimable Betsie.

On 4 May boats from Armide, with the assistance of boats from the 8-gun Cherokee-class brig-sloop Cadmus, and the gun-brigs Monkey and Daring, attacked a French convoy of armed and coasting vessels off the Île de Ré. Despite strong fire from shore batteries and the convoy's escorts, the British accounted for 17 ships, burning 13 of them and forcing four ashore. Armide lost three men killed and three wounded.

On 20 June Monkey captured the chasse-marée Pelagic.

On 23 September the French ketch Jeune Julie, with her cargo of salt, arrived at Plymouth. She was a prize to Monkey.

Next, on 13 December 1810 Monkey was in company with Venerable and several other vessels at the capture of Goede Trouw.

== Fate ==
Monkey was wrecked on Belle Isle on 25 December 1810. She was part of the force blockading Lorient. After enduring gales for several days Fitzgerald steered her towards Belle Isle in Quiberon Bay to take shelter. As she approached Belle Isle the wind increased. At 4am, as she prepared to anchor, the wind blew out or split her sails. She dropped her anchors, but one cable broke immediately and the other could not hold her. Within an hour she was aground on the rocks, which pierced her hull. As she filled with water her crew took to her rigging. The crew then jumped in the water to swim to the nearby shore. Lieutenant Fitzgerald and one seaman died in the attempt.

The French took the survivors prisoner. On 25 May 1814 the surviving officers and crew underwent a court-martial in Portsmouth aboard HMS Gladiator for the loss of Monkey. The crew reported that Fitzgerald had jumped into the sea when waves smashed him between the hull and the rocks, breaking his legs. The receding waves swept him away.
