= HMS Sparkler (1804) =

Gunvessel of the Royal Navy

History

United Kingdom
- Ordered: 22 March 1804
- Builder: Matthew Warren, Brightlingsea
- Laid down: May 1804
- Launched: 6 August 1804
- Fate: Wrecked 14 January 1808

General characteristics
- Class & type: Archer-class gunbrig
- Tons burthen: 17877/94 (bm)
- Length: Overall: 80 ft 3 in (24.5 m); Keel: 65 ft 11 in (20.1 m)
- Beam: 22 ft 7 in (6.9 m)
- Depth of hold: 9 ft 5 in (2.9 m)
- Armament: 2 × chase guns + 10 × 18-pounder carronades

HMS Sparkler was launched in 1804 at Brightlingsea. Lieutenant James S.A.Dennis commissioned her in August 1804 for the North Sea.

On 18 July 1805 a British squadron spotted the French Boulogne flotilla sailing along the shore. Captain Edward Owen of Immortalité sent Calypso, Fleche, Arab, and the brigs Watchful, Sparkler, and Pincher in pursuit of 22 large schooners flying the Dutch flag. The British managed to force three of the schooners to ground on the Banc de Laine near Cap Gris Nez; their crews ran two others ashore. The British also drove six French gun-vessels on shore. However, the bank off Cape Grinez, and the shot and shells from the right face of its powerful battery, soon compelled the British to move back from the shore.

On 7 August 1807 she convoyed British merchantmen to Yarmouth from the Eyder. The merchantmen had been forbidden to discharge their cargoes.

Sparkler was wrecked on 14 January 1808 off Terschelling on the Frisan coast. Her crew had to take to her rigging after water came up over her upper deck and the surf started breaking over her. A fisherman rescued the survivors the next day. Sparkler lost 14 of her 50 crew in the incident. The Dutch took Lieutenant Dennis and the other survivors prisoner. Newspaper accounts stated that she lost 17 of 53 crew members. The storm that wrecked Sparkler also wrecked the hired armed cutter Lord Keith.
