= Hired armed cutter Active =

During the period of the French Revolutionary and Napoleonic Wars, there were two or three vessels known as His Majesty's hired armed cutter Active that served the British Royal Navy. The reason for the uncertainty in the number is that the size of the vessels raises the possibility that the first and second may have been the same vessel.

== The first hired cutter Active ==
Active served the Royal Navy from 12 May 1794 to 22 November 1800. She was of 712/94 tons (bm) and carried ten 3-pounder guns.

In 1795 Active served as Royal Escort for Princess Caroline of Brunswick.

Active's next noteworthy appearance occurred when she signalled the approach of the Dutch fleet to Admiral Adam Duncan before his victory at Camperdown on 11 October 1797. Her commander, Master John Hamilton, was on the deck of Venerable when Vice-Admiral Jan de Winter surrendered his sword. As a member of the fleet, even though she did not participate in the combat, she was entitled to share in the £120,000 in prize money for the sale of the Dutch ships captured then. In 1847 the Admiralty awarded the Naval General service Medal with clasp "Camperdown" to any surviving claimants from the action. Active's officers and crew qualified.

Active participated in the disastrous Anglo-Russian invasion of Holland against the Batavian Republic under Vice-admiral Andrew Mitchell and Lieutenant General Ralph Abercromby. On 28 August 1799, she and the hired armed cutter Swan participated in the capture of the Dutch hulks Drotchterland and Broederschap, and the ships Helder, Venus, Minerva, and Hector, in the New Diep, in Holland. Prize money for these vessels was due to be paid on 24 February 1802.

On 9 October 1800, while Active was on the River Ems and still under Hamilton's command, a French privateer, together with some Dutch gunboats, captured her. Active was anchored for the night some five miles below Delfsul when the privateer and the gunboats came up and captured her. They took her into Delfsul. The French took Active into service as Victoire.

The hired armed brig Lady Ann, of 16 guns and under the command of Lieutenant John Lake, recaptured Active off Flamborough Head on 16 May 1801, after a running fight and chase of 17 hours. Victoire was operating as a privateer, was armed with fourteen 4-pounder guns, and had a crew of 75 men. She was under the command of Jean Beville. Lake found that his prisoners far outnumbered his small crew so he made first for Bridlington where he landed 55 of the prisoners, and then sailed on to Yarmouth with the prize and another 20 prisoners.

== The second hired cutter Active ==
The second hired cutter Active served the Royal Navy on two contracts. The first was from 5 June 1803 to 4 August. She was renamed the Lord Keith in 1804. As Lord Keith she served from 14 February 1804 to 11 January 1808. Lord Keith was of 7173/94 tons (bm) and was armed with six 4-pounder guns.

In 1805 she was under the command of Lieutenant Morris. Between 23 and 25 April 1805 Lord Keith was a part of a squadron that captured the Dutch armed schuyts No. s 43, 45, 48, 52, 54, and 57, and the unarmed Transport No. 3, all off Boulogne.

On 26 May 1807, Lord Keith was in company with Resolution and some other vessels when they captured Hopet and Neptunis. On 28 June Lord Keith was in company with Crescent when they captured Liebe. (Note: A seaman's share of the prize money was £1 3s 2 1/2d.) Two days later they captured Minerva. Then on 15 July the cutter captured the Vrouwengast. On 6 August, Resolution, Lynx, and Lord Keith were in company when they captured the Danish vessel Adjutor. On 3 August she and Resolution captured Zeldenrust. Lastly, on 1 September, Lord Keith captured the Danish Ship Welfornyet.

On 11 January 1808 a violent gale drove Lord Keith into Cuxhaven where the French captured her. At the time of her capture, Lord Keith was under the command of Lieutenant Mitchell Roberts. The French managed to rescue her entire crew. (The storm that wrecked Lord Keith also wrecked HMS Sparkler.)

== The third hired cutter Active ==
The third hired cutter Active served from 14 June 1803 to 4 May 1814. She had a burthen of 7759/94 tons and was armed with eight 4-pounder guns.

In 1803 Active was under the command first of Lieutenant J. Walker and then Lieutenant E. Tritton.

On 20 February 1804, while under the commanded of Lieutenant John Williams, and with a crew of about 30 men and boys, Active was off Gravelines when she sighted 16 sail of French gun-boats and transports running from Ostend towards Boulogne. Williams immediately gave chase and soon commenced a running fight with the flotilla. Shortly thereafter he compelled the outermost vessel, a horse-transport, to strike. The delay occasioned in taking possession of the horse transport Jeune Isabelle enabled the other vessels to get under the protection of shore batteries before Active could resume the pursuit. Prize money was due to be paid on 3 April 1805.

On 5 September 1805, Active captured Sophia Amelia. (Note: The prize money due her captain was £5 14s 7 1/2d. That for a seaman was 9s 3 3/4d.) Ten days later Active, under the command of Lieutenant William Barnes, recaptured the sloop Providence. The next day Active recaptured Betsey Francis. (Note: The prize money for an ordinary seaman for the last two vessels was 3s 6d.)

Active was in the Channel later in 1807 and there encountered the French privateer Renarde, of Calais. An inconclusive engagement followed in which the French vessel had eight men killed and seven wounded before she escaped. Skylark captured Renarde on 7 November 1807.

On 26 August 1807, Active, under the command of Lieutenant T.B.A. Hicks, captured Boletta Elizabeth. That same day Active captured Junge Hendrick. (Note: The prize money to Hicks was £284 2s. The prize money for an ordinary seaman was £13 10s 7d. Unfortunately, this money was not declared and paid until June 1819.) Two days later Hicks captured Fornoyelsen. On 3 March 1810 prize monies resulting from the capture of Boletta Elizabeth and Fornoyelsen were due for payment. The notice referred to Hicks, as "the late". Active shared the award for Fornoyelsen with the fireship Phosphorus.

On 13 January 1808, Pandora, Commander Henry Hume Spence, captured the French privateer Entreprenant, of 16 guns and 58 men. The chase took an hour and forty minutes and finished two miles from the French coast under the batteries near Cap Gris Nez. Entreprenant would not stop until her captain, M. Bloudin, her second captain, and four or five men had been wounded and Pandora had run alongside her. She had been out of Calais for three days and had taken the brig Mary, of Sunderland. Active, under the command of Lieutenant Robert Ellary, joined in the chase and took off some of the prisoners. (Note: Entreprenant, from Boulogne, had been commissioned in December 1807 under a Captain Blondin, with 50–60 men and 16 guns. Pandora captured both Entreprenant and her prize.)

Lieutenant James Askey commanded Active in 1810. On 11 January 1809, Active, under the command of Mr. John Middleton, captured the French privateer St. Jago et Erfurt. On 4 July Active was under the command of Lieutenant Stephen Cousins when she captured the Dutch smack Erasmus. This may have occurred while she was participating in the debacle that was the Walcheren Campaign.

On 11 March 1811 Active arrived at Deal, Kent, with a prize, from off the Scaw at the entrance to the Kattegat.

In 1812, Active came under the command of Lieutenant Josias Bray. (Note: Several sources conflate Josias Bray with James Bray, late commander of HMS Plumper.)

Active spent the rest of her contract carrying dispatches to and from Flushing. On 8 December 1812, she arrived at Harwich, having brought his Excellency Prince Kollosky, Envoy Extraordinary from Russia to Sardinia, from Gothenburg. Bray transferred to the hired armed cutter Badger, which he commanded in 1813–1814.

On 27 March 1814 Active, under the command of James Rogers, recaptured Telemachus. The next day Active arrived at Deal from the Scheldt having detained and brought in a brig from St Ubes, Portugal.
