= HMS Firm (1804) =

Brig of the Royal Navy

History

United Kingdom
- Name: HMS Firm
- Ordered: 9 January 1804
- Builder: Josiah & Thomas Brindley, Frindsbury
- Launched: 2 July 1804
- Commissioned: 1805
- Honours and awards: Naval General Service Medal with clasp "Firm 24 April 1810"
- Fate: Wrecked, 29 June 1811

General characteristics
- Class & type: Archer-class gun-brig
- Tons burthen: 18022/94 (bm)
- Length: 80 ft 1 3/4 in (24.4 m) (gundeck); 66 ft 0 1/8 in (20.1 m) (keel)
- Beam: 22 ft 7 7/8 in (6.9 m)
- Depth of hold: 9 ft 5 1/2 in (2.9 m)
- Propulsion: Sails
- Sail plan: Brig
- Complement: 50
- Armament: 10 × 18-pounder carronades + 2 x chase guns

HMS Firm was a 12-gun Archer-class gun-brig of the Royal Navy, launched on 2 July 1804. She served in the Channel, where she engaged in one action that would eventually result in her crew qualifying for the Naval General Service Medal. She grounded in 1811 and her crew had to destroy her before abandoning her.

== Service history ==
Lieutenant Cornellius Collett commissioned Firm in July or August 1804. On 9 January 1805 she left on a cruise.

Early in the morning of 24 April 1805, HMS Leda sighted twenty-six French vessels rounding Cap Gris Nez. Honyman immediately ordered Fury, Harpy, Railleur, Bruiser, Gallant, Archer, Locust, Tickler, Watchful, Monkey, Firm, and Starling to intercept. After a fight of about two hours, Starling and Locust had captured seven armed schuyts in an action within pistol-shot of the shore batteries on Cap Gris Nez. (Note: A schuyt was a Dutch flat-bottomed sailboat, broad in the beam, with square stern; usually equipped with leeboards to serve for a keel.) The schuyts were all of 25 to 28 tons burthen, and carried in all 117 soldiers and 43 seamen under the command of officers from the 51st Infantry Regiment. The French convoy had been bound for Ambleteuse from Dunkirk. On the British side the only casualty was one man wounded on Archer. The seven schyuts were:

- Schuyt No. 52, under the command of a Sub-Lieutenant of Infantry Loriol, armed with three 24-pounders;
- Schuyt No. 48, under the command of A. Joron of the 51st the Infantry, armed with two 6-pounders, one 24-pounder and one brass howitzer;
- Schuyt No. 57, under the command of Lieutenant Loriol of 51st Infantry, armed with one 24-pounder and two 6-pounders;
- Schuyt No. 45 under the command of Sub-Lieutenant Litner of the 51st Infantry, armed with one 24-pounder, one 12-pounder and one 6-pounder;
- Schuyt No. 3. under the command of Mr. Calder, the senior commander, who left her before the British took possession of her;
- Schuyt No. 54, under the command of Sub-Lieutenant Bragur of the 51st Infantry, armed with one 24-pounder and two 6-pounders;
- Schuyt No.43, Sub Lieutenant Billa of the 51st Infantry, armed with one 24-pounder and two 6-pounders.

The next day Archer brought in two more schuyts, No.s 44 and 58, each armed with one 24-pounder and two 12-pounders. On 25 April 1805 Railleur towed eight of the French schuyts into the Downs. Starling, which had received a great deal of damage, followed Railleur in. As part of the British squadron, Firm shared in the prize money for eight Dutch armed schuyts (No.'s 43, 44, 45, 48, 52, 54, 57, and 58) and the unarmed Transport No.3.

At the end of April 1806 Firm detained and sent into Dover both the Danish galiot Mercurius, and the Prussian Mercurius.

On 28 August 1807, Firm, still under Collett's command, captured the Dutch vessel Baer.

Firm was paid off later that year. Lieutenant Henry Montressor recommissioned her in April 1808.

Lieutenant John Little assumed command of Firm in August 1808. She was under the orders of Commodore Philippe d'Auvergne, and was stationed at Guernsey. There he helped people secretly communicating with supporters of the House of Bourbon.

On 6 January 1809 Firm captured St Jean and Amies. Ten months later, on 15 October 1809 Firm captured the Danish galiot Dageraag.

On 20 April 1810 the boats of Firm, Surly, and Sharpshooter, under the command of Lieutenant Hodgkins of Firm, and Mr Lagaw, 2nd Master of Sharpshooter, cut out the French privateer cutter Alcide from the mouth of the Pirou River, where she had taken refuge after the British vessels had chased her. Alcide was moored under the protection of 400 troops on shore, who kept up an incessant fire while the boarding party carried her. Alcide had thrown her four 4-pounder guns overboard during the chase to lighten her. One man was killed and another wounded, both from Firm. (Note: French records show Alcide as being from Bordeaux and commissioned in 1808 under a Captain Brun, with 30 men and 4 guns. The French records report that she was sunk on 30 April 1810 by HMS Surey [sic] off Granville.) In 1847 the Admiralty awarded the Naval General Service Medal with the clasps "Firm 24 April 1810" and "Surly 24 April 1810", to all survivors of the action.

Firm was at Jersey in July. There Little saved a marine by jumping into the water to rescue him.

In October 1810 Firm detained and sent into Portsmouth Christiana Elizabeth, Hamphall, master, a Swedish vessel sailing from Buenos Ayres.

On 12 March 1811 Firm and Challenger were off the Île de Batz, with the rest of the British blockading squadron hull down on the horizon. Firm and Challenger sighted two strange sails, which turned out to be the French frigates Prégel and Revanche. Challenger sent Firm to carry the news to the nearest British port, while trying to sail so as to draw the French vessels towards the rest of the British squadron. After a chase of three hours and the loss of two men killed on Challenger, the French frigates succeeded in capturing her; they then evaded the British squadron and took Challenger into Le Conquet.

On 28 June 1811, in company with the Fylla, Firm attacked two praams off Granville. The praams were attempting to drive off British boats that were reconnoitering, but were then unable to return to harbour. The praams were in water too shallow for Firm to approach and she was unable to engage them with much effect.

The following night, while wearing round to sail out of Cancalle Bay, Firm grounded at the top of high water. Her crew set her on fire to avoid the French capturing her. Fylla took Lieutenant Little, his officers, and crew to Jersey. A court martial acquitted him of blame.

== See also ==
- List of gun-brigs of the Royal Navy
