= HMS Sharpshooter (1805) =

Brig of the Royal Navy

History

United Kingdom
- Name: HMS Sharpshooter
- Ordered: June 1804
- Builder: Warren Matthew, Brightlingsea
- Laid down: August 1804
- Launched: 2 February 1805
- Fate: Sold for breaking up in 1816

General characteristics
- Class & type: Archer-class gunbrig
- Tons burthen: 17747/94(bm)
- Length: Overall:80 ft 2 in (24.4 m); Keel:65 ft 11 in (20.1 m)
- Beam: 22 ft 6 in (6.9 m)
- Depth of hold: 9 ft 5 in (2.9 m)
- Complement: 50
- Armament: 10 × 18-pounder carronades + 2 chase guns

HMS Sharpshooter (or Sharp Shooter) was launched in 1805. She operated in the Channel, often from the Channel Islands. She participated in two actions and captured a small number of merchant vessels. She was sold and broken up in 1816.

== Career ==
Lieutenant John Goldie commissioned Sharpshooter in April 1805.

In April 1806 Sharp Shooter detained the American vessel Commerce, Ford, master, from Baltimore and sent her into Plymouth.

In May Sharp Shooter sent Vrienchap, Heijelts, master, from Bordeaux, into Plymouth.

On 12 September the post ship HMS Constance and the brigs Sharpshooter and Strenuous were off Saint-Malo when they sighted a French frigate of some 30 guns. They gave chase until their quarry ran aground near Cape Fréhel. The British were not able to get close enough to fire on her and the presence of French shore batteries and the French army made it too hazardous to send in their boats to cut her out.

On 29 December General Perpignon [sic] captured Patent, Barugh, master, at 49°48′N 8°30′W as Patent was on her way from New Providence to London. However Sharp Shooter and the hired armed cutter Britannia recaptured Patent and sent her into Plymouth.

In May 1807 Sharp Shooter detained Maria, which had been sailing from Leghorn to Tonningen, and sent her into Portsmouth.

On 11 October 1807, the French privateer Prince Jerome captured the American vessel Honeflus, Ford, master, which had been sailing from Virginia to London. Sharp Shooter recaptured Honeflus and sent her into Guernsey. (Note: Prince Jerome was probably a privateer from Morlaix commissioned in October 1807. She remained active into 1808.)

Sharp Shooter recaptured the American ship Honeflus.

On 20 April 1810 the boats of HMS Firm, Surly, and Sharpshooter cut out the French privateer cutter Alcide from the mouth of the Pirou River, where she had taken refuge after the British vessels had chased her. Alcide was moored under the protection of 400 troops on shore, who kept up an incessant fire while the boarding party carried her. Alcide had thrown her four 4-pounder guns overboard during the chase to lighten her. One man was killed and another wounded, both from Firm. In 1847 the Admiralty awarded the Naval General Service Medal with the clasps "Firm 24 April 1810" and "Surly 24 April 1810", to all survivors of the action from those two vessels. (Note: French records show Alcide as being from Bordeaux and commissioned in 1808 under a Captain Brun, with 30 men and 4 guns. The French records report that HMS Surey [sic] sank her on 30 April 1810 off Granville.)

On 5 August 1812 the Royal Navy detained Asia. Sharpshooter was one of the many vessels that shared in the proceeds of the sale of Asia. (Note: A first-class share of the proceeds was worth £9 10s 10d; a sixth-class share, that of an ordinary seaman, was worth 2s 6d.)

On 22 November 1813 Sharpshooter recaptured the Swedish brig Mercurius. On 20 November a French privateer from Saint-Malo captured the Swedish vessel Mercury, Starre, master, which was sailing from Cadiz to Gothenburg. Sharpshooter recaptured Mercury off Portland and she arrived at Guernsey on 23 November.

== Fate ==
In September 1815 Sharpshooter was paid off into ordinary. The "Principal Officers and Commissioners of His Majesty's Navy" offered "Sharpshooter gun-brig, of 178 tons", lying at Woolwich, for sale on 30 May 1816. She sold on that date for £600 for breaking up.
