= HMS Proselyte (1804) =

Frigate of the Royal Navy

History

United Kingdom
- Name: Ramillies
- Builder: Unknown, North Shields Newcastle upon Tyne
- Launched: 1804
- Acquired: June 1804
- Renamed: HMS Proselyte
- Fate: Crushed by ice 5 December 1808

General characteristics
- Type: Sixth rate
- Tons burthen: 40392/94 (bm)
- Length: 107 ft 6 in (32.77 m) (overall); 87 ft 3 1/4 in (26.6 m) (keel)
- Beam: 29 ft 6 in (8.99 m)
- Propulsion: Sails
- Complement: Sixth rate:155; Bomb:70
- Armament: Sixth rate: Upper deck: 24 × 9-pounder guns; QD: 2 × 6-pounder guns; Fc: 2 × 6-pounder bow chasers; Bomb: 8 × 24-pounder carronades + 1 × 13" mortar + 1 × 10" mortar (probably)

The Royal Navy purchased the Newcastle collier Ramillies in June 1804 and commissioned her as HMS Proselyte in September 1804, having converted her to a 28-gun sixth rate in July and August. Between 1806 and 1808 she was converted to a bomb vessel. She was crushed by ice and abandoned in 1808 at the island of Anholt while acting as a lightvessel.

== Service ==
Proselyte was commissioned under Captain George Hardinge in September 1804. Captain George Sayer was appointed to command her in January 1805. On 9 January 1805 he sailed her for the West Indies, escorting a convoy of 150 merchant vessels and three regiments of infantry. The convoy reached Barbados safely, having eluded the Rochefort squadron, under Rear-Admiral Allemand, who had found out about the convoy and was looking for it. Sayer moved to Galatea in July and Captain John Woolcombe took command, sailing her back to Portsmouth in November. When Proselyte arrived at Portsmouth she was paid off into ordinary. Between December 1806 and April 1808 the Navy converted her to a bomb vessel.

She was recommissioned in February 1808 under the command of Captain Henry James Lyford and sailed to the Baltic. During the Gunboat War on 2 October 1808 the Admiralty published a notice for mariners that it had ordered her to station herself off the island of Anholt in the Kattegat to carry a light for the safety of passing convoys. (At the outbreak of the war the Danes had closed their lighthouse on Anholt.) Proselyte took up her station in early November.

== Loss ==
Proselyte was caught in the ice on 5 December 1808 and was wrecked at the outer end of the Anholt reef. The ice pushed her onto her starboard beam, forcing her crew to abandon her. They then walked, with great difficulty but no losses, 8 nautical miles (15 km; 9.2 mi) to Anholt Island. Proselyte's loss led the British to send a squadron in May consisting of HMS Standard, HMS Owen Glendower, and some smaller vessels to seize Anholt and restore the lighthouse.
