= HMS Watchful (1804) =

History

Great Britain
- Name: Jane
- Launched: 1795, Norfolk
- Fate: Sold 1804

United Kingdom
- Name: HMS Watchful
- Acquired: June 1804 by purchase
- Fate: Sold 1814

General characteristics
- Tons burthen: 169 (bm)
- Length: Overall: 76 ft 3 in (23.2 m); Keel: 76 ft 3 in (23.2 m)
- Beam: 59 ft 2 in (18.0 m)
- Draught: 23 ft 2 in (7.1 m)
- Complement: 45
- Armament: 2 × 9-pounder guns + 10 × 18-pounder carronades

The Royal Navy purchased the mercantile brig Jane in 1804 and renamed her HMS Watchful. Jane had been launched in 1795 at Norfolk. In 1805 she participated in several actions against French and Dutch vessels on their way to Boulogne. Watchful also participated in the siege of Cadiz in 1810–1811. The Navy sold her in 1814.

== Career ==
Jane was one of 10 mercantile vessels that the Navy purchased in 1804 and armed to supplement the 20 Confounder-class gunbrigs that it was having built.

Lieutenant James Marshall commissioned Watchful in June 1804.

On 29 January 1805, a French flotilla consisting of 17 brigs, three schooners, four sloops, a dogger, and six luggers arrived at Boulogne from the west. Immortalite exchanged fire with them but they were too close to shore to capture. One lugger lost her foremast and Harpy was able to capture her after a brief exchange of fire; the lugger went into the Downs with Bruiser. A subsequent prize money notice named the lugger as Gunboat No. 337 (or No. 317); Watchful and Immortalite shared in the capture.

Early on the morning of 24 April Gallant and Watchful sighted a flotilla of 27 vessels under Dutch colours coming around Cape Grisnez and approaching Boulogne from the east. The two brigs engaged, giving the squadron under command of Captain Robert Honyman in Leda time to join the action. Gallant received four shot "between wind and water" (i.e., below the water line when not heeling), and had to disengage to stop the leaks; she had no casualties. Watchful captured one of the vessels.

Captain Robert Honyman of Leda, led the rest of his squadron, consisting of Fury, Harpy, Railleur, Bruiser, Archer, Locust, Tickler, Monkey, and Firm, in chase. After an engagement of about two hours the British succeeded in capturing seven schuyts (including the one that Watchful had captured earlier). All were from 25 to 28 tons burthen, six were armed with from two to three guns and howitzers ranging from 6 to 24-pounders, and were carrying troops from Dunkirk to Ambleteuse. Most were under the command of army officers. One, No. 3, was a transport. British casualties amounted only to one man wounded. Archer, in a separate letter, reported capturing two more schuyts similarly armed and manned. A number of other British vessels in the squadron under Admiral B. Douglas also shared in the prize money because they were part of the blockading force, even though they were not present; however, the head money for the crews of the armed schuyts accrued only to the actual captors, including Watchful.

On 18 July the British spotted the French Boulogne flotilla sailing along the shore. Captain Edward Owen of Immortalité sent Calypso, Fleche, Arab, and the brigs Watchful, Sparkler, and Pincher in pursuit of 22 large schooners flying the Dutch flag. The British managed to force three of the schooners to ground on the Banc de Laine near Cap Gris Nez; their crews ran two others ashore. The British also drove six French gun-vessels on shore. However, the bank off Cape Griz Nez, and the shot and shells from the right face of its powerful battery, soon compelled the British to move back from the shore.

Lieutenant Marshall drowned on 18 July. Lieutenant Patrick Lowe replaced him in command of Watchful in October.

On 2 November Watchful and Bold recaptured Ceres, John and Amy, and George.

Watchful went into ordinary at Sheerness in 1807. On 10 September 1810, the "Principal Officers and Commissioners of His Majesty's Navy" offered her for sale at Sheerness.

The Navy did not sell her. Instead, she went to Gibraltar to serve as a tender under the command of Captain Thomas Fellowes. After arriving at Gibraltar, on 9 October he sailed to Cadiz with reinforcements, including nine gunboats. His arrival brought the squadron of gunboats assisting at the siege of Cadiz up to 30 gunboats. On his arrival he took charge of the squadron, operating from Watchful. On 15 November Captain Robert Hall arrived from Gibraltar. He took over as senior officer of the flotilla and hoisted his pendant in Rambler. Fellowes commanded half the flotilla until 22 April 1811, when he again assumed overall command until June 1811 when he was promoted out of the role.

Watchful returned to England where she served as a tender on the Thames under the command of Lieutenant George Fox.

== Fate ==
On 3 November 1814, the "Principal Officers and Commissioners of His Majesty's Navy" offered her for sale at Sheerness. She sold for £1,240.
