= Henriette Mathiesen =

Norwegian actress and culture personality

Anna Henrikka "Henriette" Petronelle Mathiesen (16 November 1762 – 18 March 1825 in Aker), was a Norwegian actress and culture personality. She was the first leading lady of the first theatre in Oslo, Det Dramatiske Selskab.

Mathiesen was born in Christiania as the daughter of timber merchant and judge Jørgen Mathiesen (1725–1764) and his wife Karen Haagensdatter Nielsen (1735–1766): she was the sister of Haagen Mathiesen. She was educated in Madame le Grands Institute in Copenhagen in Denmark.

Upon her return to Norway, she belonged to the leading high society in Oslo. In 1780, the first theatre in the city, the amateur theatre Det Dramatiske Selskab, was founded. She became the female star of the theatre and performed, among other parts, in the part of Lindane in the Coffee house by Voltaire translated by Ditlevine Feddersen opposite the poet Envold Falsen as Frelon.

In 1789, she married Envold Falsen.

== Sources ==
- E. H. S. Dietrichson: Omrids af den norske poesis historie
- H. J. Huitfeldt: Christiania Theaterhistorie
