= Anholt (island) =

Danish island in Kattegat

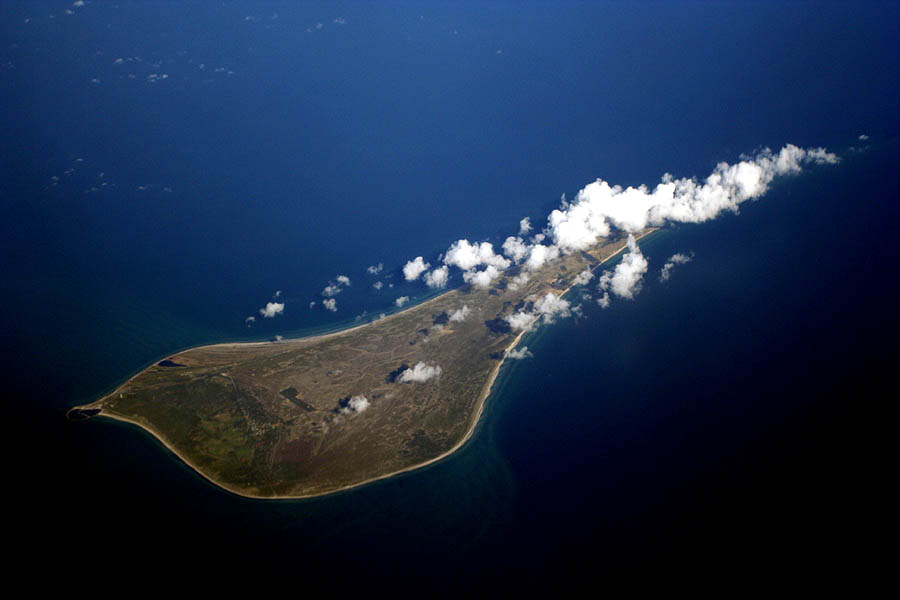
- Aerial view of Anholt

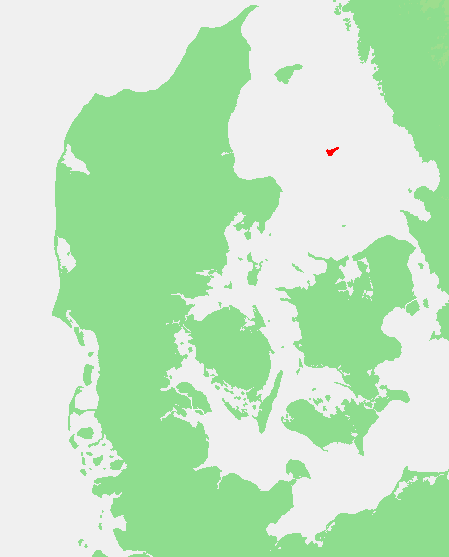

Geography
- Location: Kattegat
- Coordinates: 56°42′45″N 11°33′36″E
- Area: 22 km^{2} (8.5 sq mi)

Administration
- Denmark
- Region: Mid Jutland Region
- Municipality: Norddjurs Municipality

Demographics
- Population: 150 (2022)
- Pop. density: 7.8/km^{2} (20.2/sq mi)

Ramsar Wetland
- Official name: Waters north of Anholt
- Designated: 2 September 1977
- Reference no.: 151

Anholt (Danish pronunciation: [ˈænˌhʌlˀt]) is a Danish island in the Kattegat, midway between Jutland and Sweden at the entrance to the North Sea in Northern Europe. There were 150 permanent residents as of 1 January 2022. Anholt is eleven km (6.8 mi) long and about six km (3.7 mi) wide at its widest, and covers an area of 21.75 km^{2} (5,370 acres). Anholt is part of Norddjurs Municipality in Region Midtjylland. Before the 2007 municipal reform, it was in Grenå Municipality.

The western fifth of Anholt consists of hilly moraine country, while the eastern four-fifths of the island consist of mostly flat raised seabed with some low hills, former wind-blown sand dunes. Only the western moraine hills are inhabited. The eastern part, called "Ørkenen" (The Desert) is treeless; the government has protected the area and permits no building there. The desert has never been ploughed. For this reason the original Stone Age topography from when the glaciation ceased, at the end of the last ice age 10,000 years ago, is still visible in many places. This includes former shorelines inland, consequences of different sea levels over time. The unploughed features of The Desert are unique for Denmark, as well as for this part of Europe.

The inhabited part of Anholt has two villages, The Harbour and Anholt Town, inland. There are also 300 to 400 summer houses, some of them rentals.

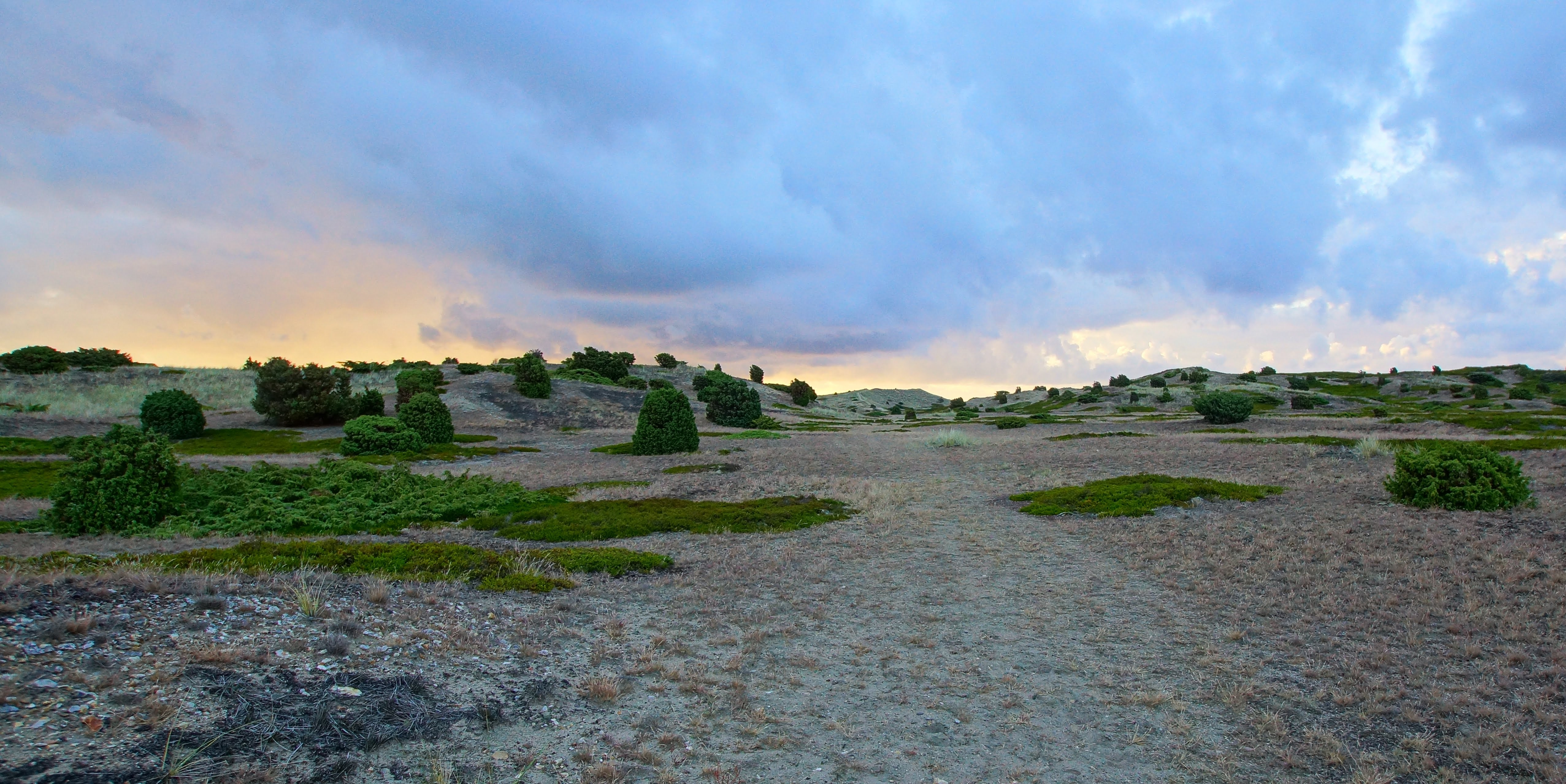
Ørkenen (The Desert) with sparse vegetation, covers 80 percent of the island.

== Terrain ==
The western part of Anholt is a moraine landscape. The small village is situated in the middle of the landscape, whereas the harbour (built 1902) is at the northwestern tip of the island. The eastern part of the island is known as Ørkenen (the desert). This desert-like area is the largest of its kind in Northern Europe. The desertification was caused by deforestation. It is not a true desert, but a lichen heath, with some 300 to 400 types of lichen.

Great efforts are being taken to preserve the scenery and prevent the effects of erosion. In 1995/6 the Danish Heath Society cleared large areas in the south part of Ørkenen of mountain pine. On Totten, the eastern tip of the island, there is one of the biggest colonies of seals in Denmark. This part of the island is closed to visitors.

=== Lighthouse ===
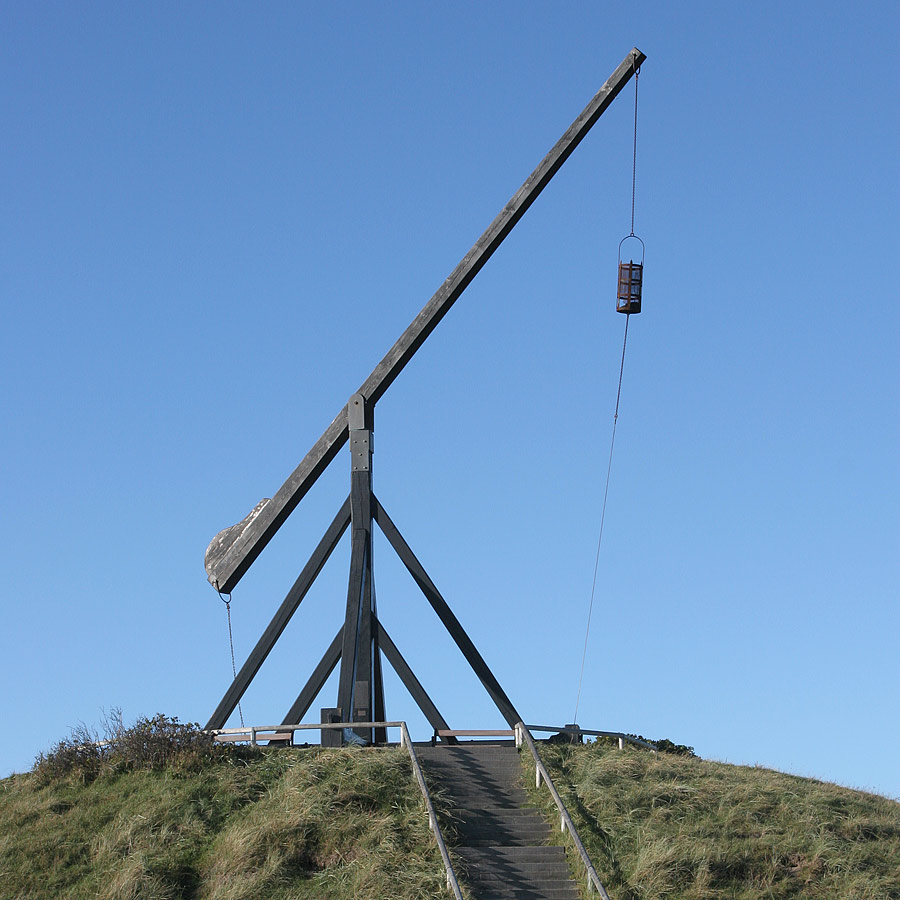
Bascule light at Skagen

Dangerous reefs and shoals surround Anholt. Consequently, in 1560 King Frederick II ordered the erection of bascule lights at Skagen, Anholt, and Kullen Lighthouse to mark the main route through Danish waters from the North Sea to the Baltic. Despite the bascule light, on 10/11 November 1716 the 60-gun third-rate HMS Auguste, Captain Robert Johnson, ran ashore on the island of Anholt during heavy weather and was wrecked. Most of the people on her were saved.

An ecological consequence of the introduction of the bascule light was the deforestation of Anholt for firewood, resulting in Anholt's "desert". By the time of the switch after 1600 to imported pit coal, considerable damage had been done.

In 1785 a 35-meter tower was erected with an open fire. In 1805 a lantern replaced the fire and in 1838 a mirror was added. Then in early 1842 a flashing light replaced the fixed light, and a lightship was towed to a station of the Knobben, off Anholt. Around the mid-19th century there was also a floating light stationed several miles out from the lighthouse, near the end of the several miles long reef. This floating light operated from May to December. Today's tower dates to 1881, at which time an oil lamp replaced the fire. At one time there was also a beacon fire in the middle of the east coast of the island, but that has disappeared. The present Anholt Fyr (lighthouse) belongs to the Danish Maritime Safety Administration and has the status of a protected historical landmark.

== Climate ==
Anholt has one of the warmest climates in Denmark.

Climate data for Anholt
Month	Jan	Feb	Mar	Apr	May	Jun	Jul	Aug	Sep	Oct	Nov	Dec	Year
Mean daily maximum °C (°F)	4 (39)	4 (39)	6 (43)	11 (52)	16 (61)	19 (66)	21 (70)	21 (70)	17 (63)	13 (55)	9 (48)	5 (41)	12 (54)
Daily mean °C (°F)	2 (36)	1 (34)	3 (37)	7 (45)	12 (54)	15 (59)	18 (64)	18 (64)	14 (57)	10 (50)	7 (45)	3 (37)	9 (49)
Mean daily minimum °C (°F)	−1 (30)	−1 (30)	0 (32)	3 (37)	8 (46)	11 (52)	14 (57)	14 (57)	11 (52)	7 (45)	4 (39)	0 (32)	6 (42)
Average rainfall mm (inches)	48.4 (1.91)	36.2 (1.43)	34.1 (1.34)	34 (1.3)	39.4 (1.55)	56.6 (2.23)	58.3 (2.30)	61.6 (2.43)	62.2 (2.45)	64.8 (2.55)	61 (2.4)	55.7 (2.19)	612.3 (24.08)
Average snowfall mm (inches)	42.4 (1.67)	43.7 (1.72)	23.5 (0.93)	2.1 (0.08)	0 (0)	0 (0)	0 (0)	0 (0)	0 (0)	0.2 (0.01)	5.6 (0.22)	24.3 (0.96)	141.8 (5.59)
Average precipitation days	9.9	7.6	7.9	6.3	7.2	8.3	8.7	9.9	9.3	10.6	10.9	10.9	107.5
Average rainy days	8.3	6.2	6.9	6.2	7.2	8.3	8.7	9.9	9.3	10.5	10.6	10.0	102.1
Average snowy days	1.0	0.9	0.9	0.1	0	0	0	0	0	0	0.2	0.7	3.8
Source: Weatherspark

Climate data for Anholt was recorded at Anholt Island Automated Reporting Station, based on a statistical analysis of historical hourly weather reports and model reconstructions from January 1, 1980, to December 31, 2016

== History ==
Anholt has been settled since the New Stone Age and one may still find flint flakes on the “desert”. There have been some Old Stone Age finds as well. Some Viking finds have been made.

The 1231 land register of King Valdemar II shows that the king owned a house or a hunting lodge on the Sønderbjerg, the island's highest point. Anholt was thus property of the crown. In 1441 the island was under the administration of Kalø Lehn, headed by Otto Nielsen Rosenkrands. Anholt belonged to the parish of Morup in the Danish province of Halland until the middle of the 16th century, when a church was built on the island itself. The island remained Danish when Denmark ceded Halland to Sweden in 1645. A story claims that a negotiator had left a glass of beer placed over the island on the map during the peace negotiations. A more plausible explanation is that Swedish forces had not conquered the fairly remote island and had little interest in it.

In 1668 Anholt was sold to the tax farmer Peder Jensen Grove. Six years later his widow married Hans Rostgaard of Krogerup and the island then came at the hands of the Rostgaard von der Maase family. Most recently, lawyer Jens Christian Rostgaard von der Maase, of Copenhagen, has owned the greater and protected part of the island.

=== British occupation (1809–1814) ===
Early in the Gunboat War (part of the Napoleonic Wars), the Danish authorities shut off the lighthouse on Anholt. On 5 December 1808, the bomb ketch HMS Proselyte was wrecked on the Anholt Reef while trapped in floating ice; the Danes rescued all her crew and immediately made them prisoners of war. Proselyte had stationed herself off the island on 9 November 1808, to carry a light for the safety of passing convoys.

Following the loss of Proselyte, on 18 May 1809, the 64-gun third rate HMS Standard, under Captain Askew Paffard Hollis, the 36-gun frigate Owen Glendower, Avenger, Ranger, Rose, and the gunvessel Snipe captured the island. A party of seamen and marines under the command of Captain William Selby of Owen Glendower, with the assistance of Captain Edward Nicolls of the Standard's marines, landed. The Danish garrison of 170 men put up a sharp but ineffectual resistance that killed one marine and wounded two; the garrison then capitulated. The British took immediate possession of the island. Hollis stated that Anholt was important as a source of water to the Navy, and as a good anchorage for merchant vessels going to or coming from the Baltic.

The principal objective of the mission was to restore the lighthouse on the island to its pre-war state to facilitate the movement of British men of war and merchantmen navigating the dangerous seas there. The Danes, upon hearing of their defeat, attempted to retake the island and launched an expedition. However, the battle of Anholt resulted in a significant British victory and the Danes made no further attempts to recapture the island. There is a monument commemorating the battle in Anholt village.

While captain of HMS Elephant, Francis Austen visited Anholt in 1812 and wrote about it to his sister, the novelist Jane Austen. He described the lighthouse in some detail and also gave some impressions of the island:

The garrison at present consists of about three men of a veteran battalion, and a few marine artillery, which form by many degrees the most considerable portion of the population, for, exclusive of the military and their appendages of wives and children, there are but sixteen families on the island, who all reside at the only village on it, near the high ground to the westward, and whose principal occupation is fishing, in which they are generally very successful during the summer. Antecedent to the war between England and Denmark and the consequent occupation of the island by the English, the Anholters paid a small rent to the proprietor of the soil, who is a Danish nobleman residing at Copenhagen; but at present they are considered and fed as prisoners of war by the English. They are an exceedingly poor people, and seem to enjoy but a small proportion of worldly comfort.

On 28 February 1812, the 16-gun brig HMS Fly was wrecked on Anholt, but without loss of life, as the British garrison on the island were able to rescue the crew. The British held Anholt until the Treaty of Kiel, which was signed on 15 January 1814, ended the war and returned the islands to Denmark.

In the 1940s, a British visitor heard a group of children reciting a verse which they did not understand the meaning of: "Jeck og Jill vent op de hill, og Jill kom tombling after". The ditty, it turned out, had been a nursery rhyme brought to the island by British soldiers during the Napoleonic Wars.

=== World War I ===
Denmark remained neutral during the war and neither side ventured into the Kattegat until late in the war when the British laid a minefield in the path of German merchantmen. During the operation the mines managed to sink 10 German trawlers off Anholt.

=== World War II ===
There were several World War II sinkings off Anholt.

- On 11 April 1940, the British submarine HMS Sealion torpedoed and sank the German steamer August Leonhardt (2,593grt) thirteen mi (21 km) south of Anholt. Sealion fired two torpedoes, one of which found its mark.
- On 1 May 1940, the British submarine HMS Narwhal, (Lt.Cdr. R.J. Burch, RN), torpedoed and sank the German troop transport Buenos Aires (6,097 GRT) and torpedoed and damaged the German troop transport Bahia Castillo (8,580 GRT) in the Kattegat about 20 nmi (37 km) north of Anholt. Bahia Castillo reached port but was declared a total loss.
- On 20 May 1940, the troop transport SS Batavier III, owned by Wm.H. van Müller & Co., hit a mine and sank northwest of Anholt.
- On 21 April 1945, British bombers sank Ostmark (ex-Côte d'Argent, launched 1932 and 3,047 GRT).
- On 5 May 1945, a RAF bomber sank the German submarine U-534. The submarine was on the surface with three other submarines when the attack occurred. The Germans shot down one of the British bombers; all its crew were lost. All of the crew of U-534 escaped the submarine, but three died of exposure or lung damage in surfacing; lifeboats from a lightship in the vicinity rescued the 49 survivors. On 25 August 1993, U-534 was pulled 220 ft (67 m) to the surface of the Kattegat Sea, 13 mi (21 km) northeast of Anholt Island. After being housed at a museum that later closed, the submarine was moved to the Woodside Ferry Terminal in Liverpool for an exhibition on U-boats that opened in February 2009.
- On 19 April 1945, rockets from eight British and Norwegian Mosquito aircraft sank the German submarine U-251 south of Anholt. Thirty-nine of her crew died; four survived.

There is a small graveyard on Anholt that holds the remains of five allied airmen. Three are from an Avro Lancaster of 428 (RCAF) Squadron that crashed into the Baltic on 30 August 1944 on a raid to Stettin. Another grave is of Flying Officer Ronald Kenneth Stratford DFM of 460 (RAAF); his Lancaster was also shot down on a raid to Stettin on 30 August 1944. On 15 December a Ju 88 night fighter shot down an Avro Lancaster of 106 Squadron, which had a crew of eight. Only three bodies washed ashore, one of them on Anholt; the others were never recovered.

== Connections ==
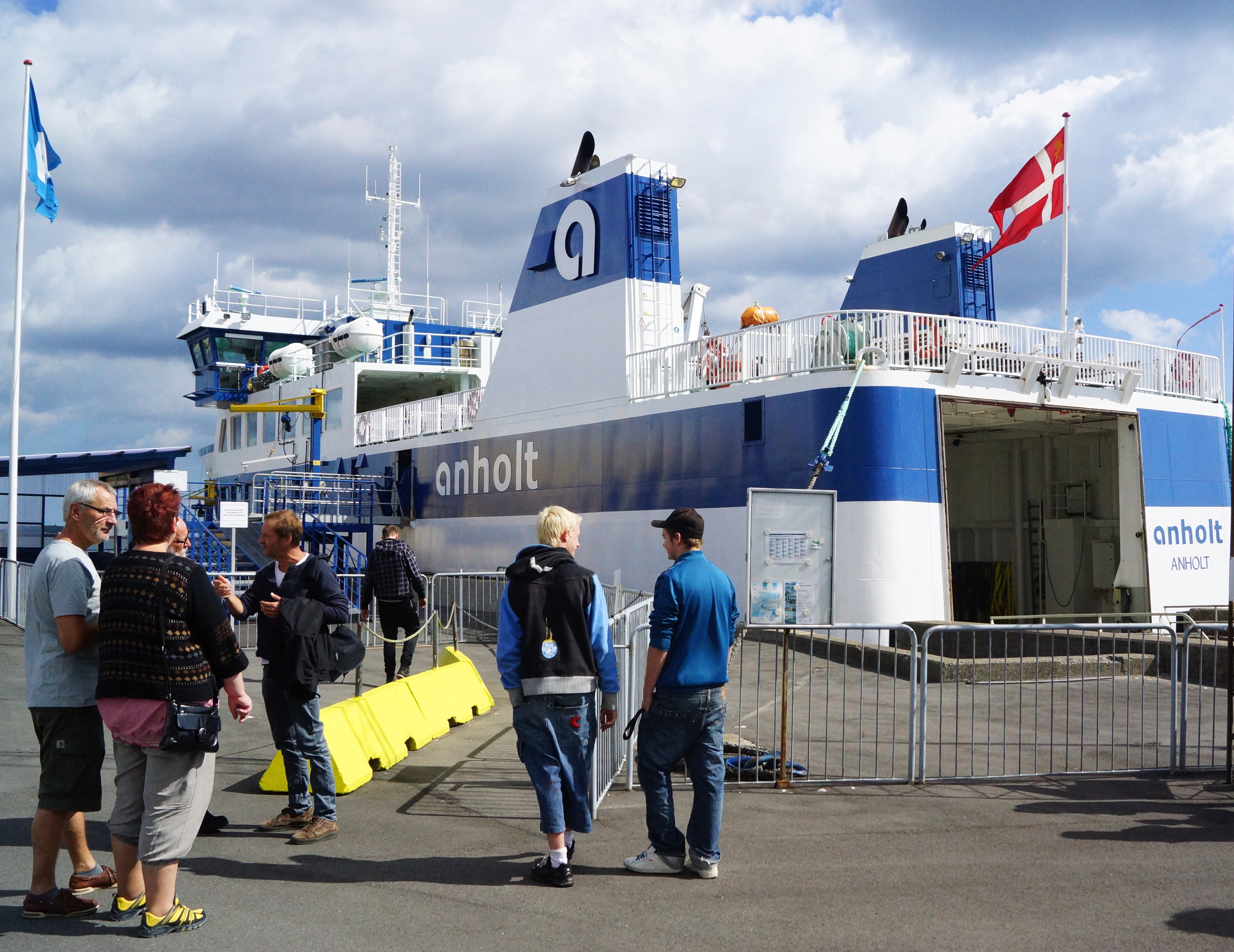
The Anholt Ferry in Grenaa Harbor.

A daily ferry from Grenå on the eastern coast of Jutland takes about three hours to reach Anholt. The ferry detours around the wind farm, which will compensate for the increased fuel consumption in order to maintain sailing schedules.

Anholt has an airport (ICAO: EKAT) with a 650 m-long (2,130 ft) grass runway. There are daily flights to Anholt during the summer and weekly flights in the winter. Flights depart from Roskilde Airport on the Danish main island, Zealand, via Copenhagen Air Taxi. The flights also go on to Læsø Island, and return to Roskilde from there, via Anholt. One can also fly from Varberg, Sweden, via charter from Varbergs Flygklubb, a flying club.

=== Port ===
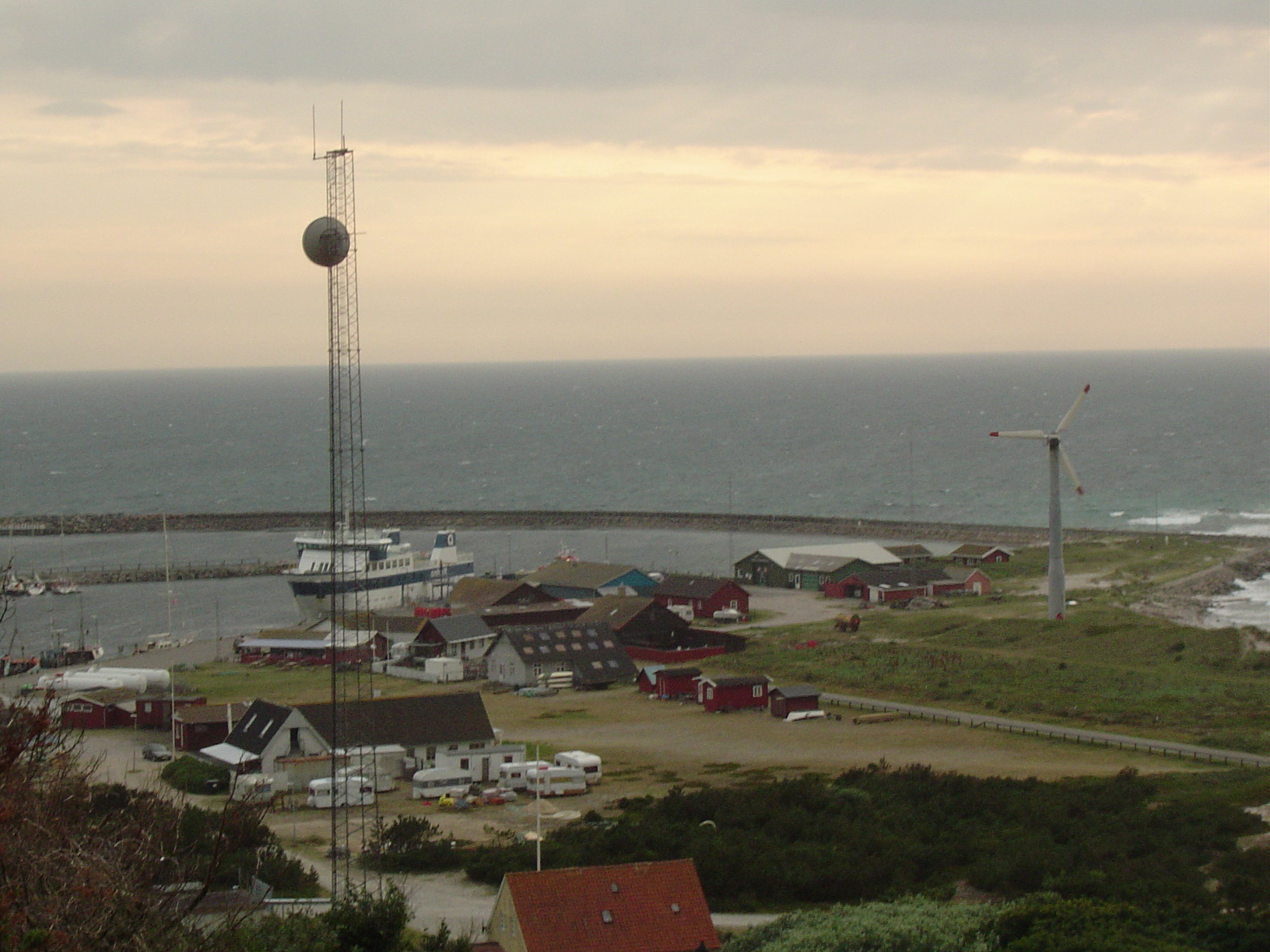
Anholt port

After some years of political debate, construction commenced in 1899 on a fishing harbour for the island. The construction was finished and the port entered service in 1902. The harbour functioned as a safe haven in storms for the vessels fishing in the Kattegat, as well as a home port for Anholt's own fishermen. Today there is a marina at the harbour and the ferry docks here too. In 2003 Anholt celebrated the 100th anniversary of the opening, but one year late.

The first rescue facility on the island was established in 1878 at the lighthouse. It was abandoned in 1926. The second rescue facility was built in 1919, but abandoned in 1938. Today there is a rescue vessel stationed at a mole in the harbour. Over the last 200 years over 200 vessels have foundered near Anholt.

== Tourism ==
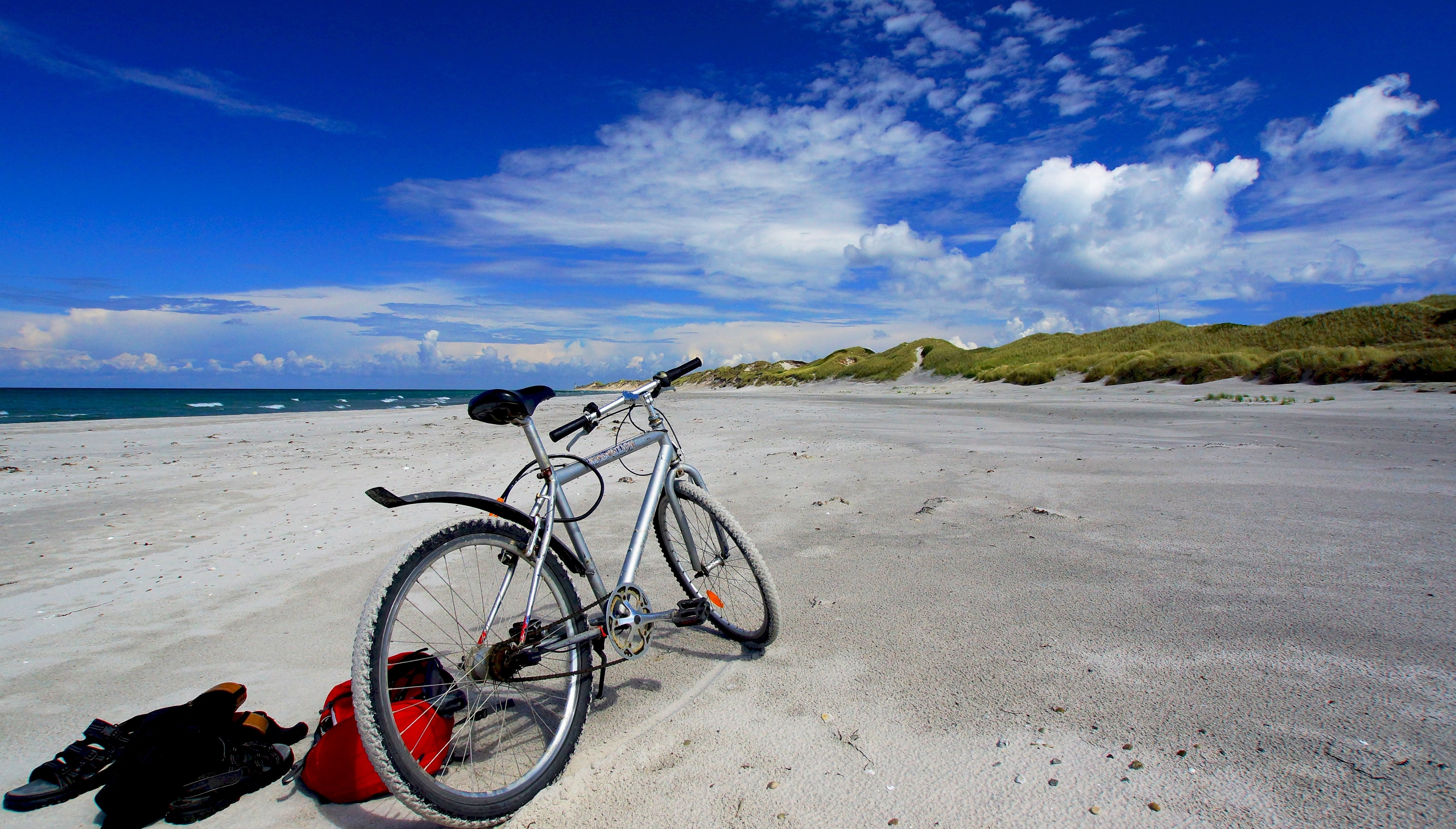
Anholt Nordstrand - the sandy, 8 km (5 mi), northern beach with characteristic coastal dunes in the background.

60,000 people visit Anholt each year. From the end of June to the first half of August the harbor is a tourist resort with restaurants and shops. Danish, Norwegian, Swedish, and German yachts are among the most common sailing boats seen at Anholt. From the two highest points on the island – Sønderbjerg (48 m) and Nordbjerg (39 m) – one can see Jutland or Sweden on a clear day. Outside the summer season, there are few visitors to Anholt. Currently an effort is made to extend the tourist season via events such as an Anholt Marathon and festivals.

== Offshore wind farm ==
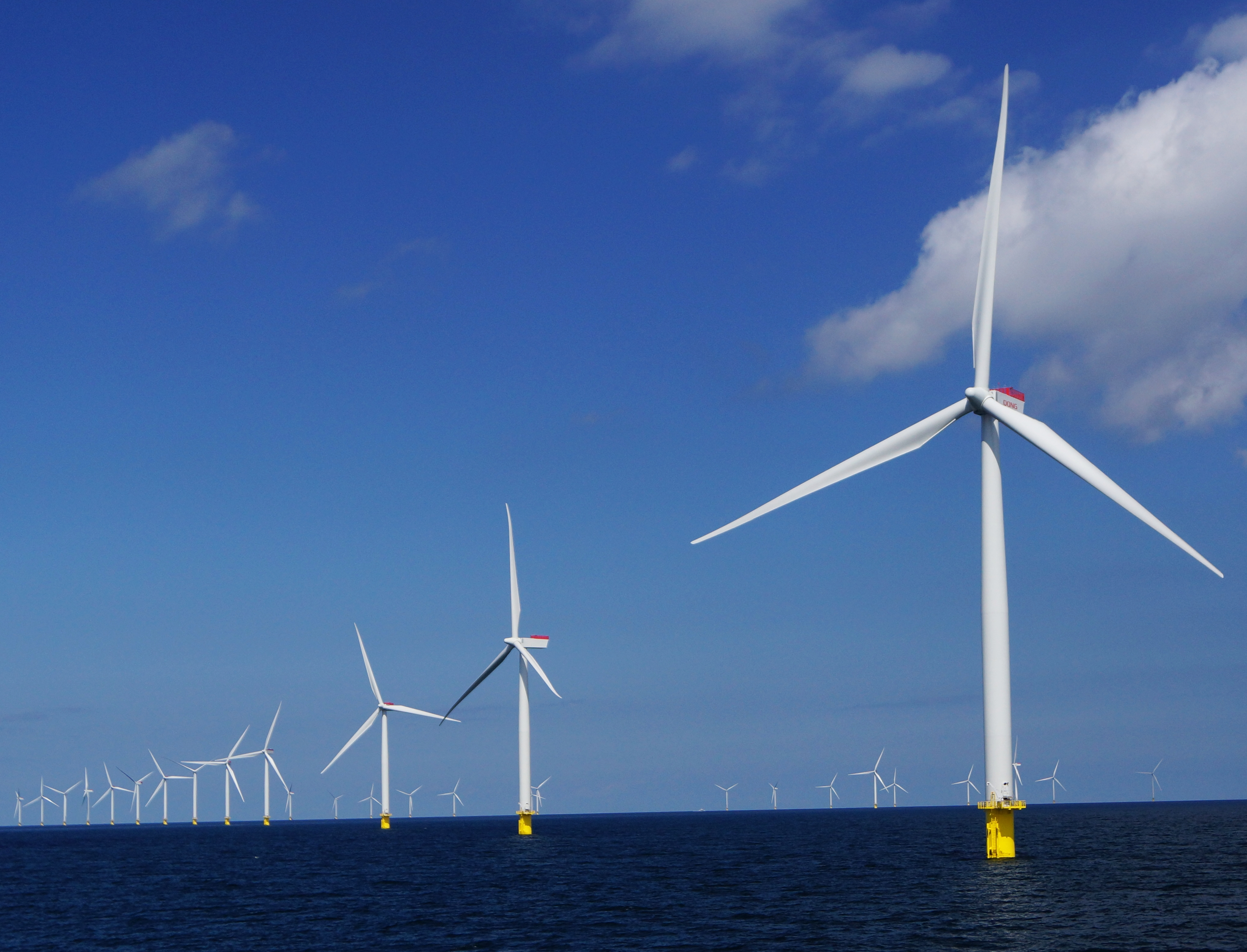
Anholt Wind Farm - 110, 4.5 MW, Turbines. The ferry passes close by.

DONG Energy has built the Anholt Offshore Wind Farm in the Kattegat, between Anholt island and Djursland (on the mainland). It consists of 111 wind turbines and has a nameplate capacity of 400 megawatts (MW). As of 2014, it was Denmark's largest marine wind park and among the five largest marine wind parks in the world. It provides energy to the island to replace much of the current diesel-powered electricity. The main part of the electricity is distributed to the mainland via a sea cable to Jutland, entering land by the town Grenå. Fishermen have been compensated for the loss of fisheries during construction. With the wind farm complete, net fishing is allowed, but trawling is banned inside the park area.

== School ==
The school, north of the meeting house, was built in 1917 and enlarged in 1956. It teaches students from kindergarten to year nine. The present church was built in 1819, after the previous one was heavily damaged during the Danish attempt to re-capture the island. There is evidence in the foundations of an even older church. Anholt has a tradition for building houses that include materials from flotsam.
