= Wulff =

Wulff is a German family surname and may refer to:

== People ==
- Anna Wulff (1874–1935), Danish kindergarten teacher
- Annkathrin Wulff (born 1986), German politician
- Bernhard Wulff (born 1948), German composer
- Bettina Wulff (born 1973), Spouse of former German President
- Christian Wulff (born 1959), German politician, former president of Germany
- Christian Wulff (1777–1843) (1777–1843), Danish naval officer
- Christian Wulff (1810–1856) (1810–1856), Danish naval officer
- David Wulff (born 1985), German politician
- Erwin Neutzsky-Wulff (born 1949), Danish philosopher and author
- Evgenii Wulff (1885–1941), Russian biologist and botanist
- Fredrik Wulff (1845–1930), Swedish linguist and translator
- Georg Wulff (1863–1925), Russian crystallographer
- Helena Wulff (born 1954), Swedish anthropologist
- Henry Wulff (Illinois politician) (1854–1907), German American politician
- Henry Wulff (Iowa politician) (born 1943), American politician
- Jim Wulff (1936–2000), American football player
- Joakim Wulff (born 1979), Swedish footballer
- Joan Wulff (born 1926), American fly fisher
- Jørgen Peter Frederik Wulff (1808–1881), Danish naval officer
- Julius Wulff (1852–1924), Danish politician and journalist
- Kai Wulff (born 1949), German-born American actor and voice actor
- Katja Wulff (1890–1992), German-Swiss dancer
- Knut Wulff (1913–2002), Swedish entrepreneur
- Lee Wulff (1905–1991), American fisherman
- Marte Wulff, Norwegian singer-songwriter
- Mikael Wulff (born 1972), Danish comedian
- Mikaela Wulff (born 1990), Finnish sailor
- Moses Benjamin Wulff (1661–1729), German-Jewish court factor
- Paul Wulff (born 1967), American football player and coach
- Peter Frederik Wulff (1774–1842), Danish naval officer
- Thorild Wulff (1877–1917), Swedish botanist
- Tim Wulff (born 1987), German footballer
- William Wulff (born 1949), American chemist
- Wilhelm Wulff, Nazi occult astrologer

== See also ==
- Wolff, a surname
- Wulf
- Wulff (comics), a fictional mutant character in the Marvel 2099 setting
