= Admiral Wulff =

Admiral Wulff may refer to:

- Christian Wulff (1777–1843), Royal Danish Navy rear admiral
- Jørgen Peter Frederik Wulff (1808–1881), Royal Danish Navy admiral
- Peter Frederik Wulff (1774–1842), Royal Danish Navy counter admiral

== See also ==
- Johnny Wolfe (born 1965), U.S. Navy vice admiral
- Max-Eckart Wolff (1902–1988), German Kriegsmarine flotilla admiral
