= Christian Wulff (disambiguation) =

Christian Wulff (born 1959) is a German politician and lawyer.

Christian Wulff may also refer to:

- Christian Wulff (1777–1843), Danish naval officer
- Christian Wulff (1810–1856), Danish naval officer

== See also ==
- Christian Wolff (disambiguation)
