= HDMS Bellona =

The following ships of the Royal Danish Navy have borne the name HDMS Bellona:

- HDMS Bellona (1830), a frigate in service 1835–1862
- HDMS Bellona (1919) a submarine launched in 1919 and decommissioned in 1946
- HDMS Bellona (F344) a Triton-class corvette launched in 1955 and decommissioned in 1981
