= Sadie Kuttner Epstein =

American concert singer (1883–1973)

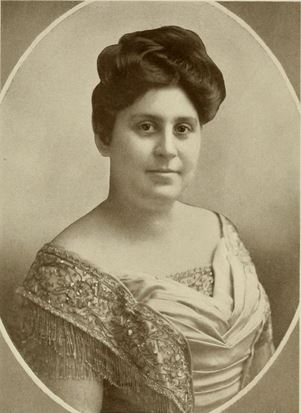
Sadie Kuttner Epstein

Sadie Kuttner Epstein (1883 - May 28, 1973) was an American concert singer.

== Early life ==
Sadie Kuttner was born in Cincinnati in 1883, the daughter of Simon H. Kuttner (1853-1940) and Pauline Grunauer (1850-1913). She moved to St. Louis in 1900, at which time she entered the Beethoven Conservatory, where she took a course of music under A. I. Epstein, who later became her husband.

As a child, she showed musical potential, taking up the study of piano. She could not remember a time when she did not sing.

== Career ==
Sadie Kuttner Epstein sang with the most prominent singing societies in St. Louis and elsewhere, engagements taking her as far north as Winnipeg, Canada, and east as far as Pittsburgh. With many of the societies she was called to take part in oratorios. Her repertoire included the soprano roles in George Frideric Handel's Hiawatha, Giuseppe Verdi's Requiem, Franz Liszt's Elizabeth of Hungary, Max Bruch's Die Schone Helene, Robert Schumann's Paradise and the Peri, and many others.

Epstein had the linguistic ability to interpret her songs in three languages. Epstein had lucrative offers from Eastern concert leaders, but she realized that she could not be the happy wife and mother that she was and lead a life such as would be required of a member of an opera troupe at the same time. Therefore, she refused those offers, and worked with the St. Louis Symphony Society. For the first time in many years, a singer from this city was chosen to appear as soloist at the regular concerts.

During the Louisiana Purchase Exposition, she was engaged by the Scranton Oratorio Society of Scranton, Pennsylvania, to sing the soprano role in Felix Mendelssohn's Oratorio, Elijah, at the concert given by them in Festival Hall in 1904. Epstein was the only St. Louis singer engaged for the concerts given during the fair, most of them coming from Chicago and New York.

Many unique programmes were rendered by Epstein in connection with Mrs. C. B. Rohland's lecture recitals, Compositions by Jean Sibelius, Johann Strauss I, Claude Debussy, Christian Wolff, Pyotr Ilyich Tchaikovsky, Mily Balakirev, Anton Rubinstein, Alexander Borodin, Mikhail Glinka, Bachmetieff, Modest Mussorgsky, and Alexander Dargomyzhsky, were presented to the public. Epstein was the first singer in America to give an entire recital of the works of the Finnish composer Sibelius. The two women prepared a programme of modern Italian music given in various cities during the season of 1913–14. Rohland was a recognized authority on musical data and was closely identified with the development of music in St. Louis. She was the director of the new Choral Society which was organized in St. Louis for singers only, the object of the club being to do strictly choral work. Rohland was a resident of Alton, Illinois, but made weekly visits to St. Louis for the purpose of directing musical societies. The Alton public had brought before them many of the leading orchestras, soloists and best musical talent of all countries through the influence of Rohland.

== Personal life and family ==
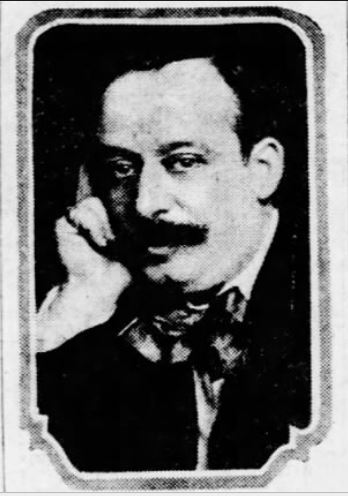
Abraham I. Epstein (1858-1929)

Sadie Kuttner Epstein was the wife of Abraham I. Epstein (1858-1929), of the Beethoven Conservatory, with whom, from 1879 to 1924, as organist and choirmaster of St. John's Methodist Church and the Temple Shaari Emeth, she sung many years. Epstein, in addition to conservatory work, directed these two church choirs for more than twenty years.

Two of the representative musicians of St. Louis are Marcus I. Epstein (1855-1947) and Abraham I. Epstein, who gained a national reputation as players of duets on the piano. Herman Epstein was equally distinguished as a pianist. They were Native Americans — born in Mobile, Alabama, the sons of Rabbi Isaac Epstein.

Abraham Epstein studied with Eugène Prévost and other masters, devoting himself mainly to teaching piano, organ and composition lessons. He wrote a concerto for orchestra and piano, and composed considerable church music.

The Epsteins lived at 4316 Lindell, and had two daughters, Marian Epstein Goldstein (1905-1985) and Janet Epstein Mendelson (1909-2005), who were also talented in music. Sadie Kuttner Epstein died on May 28, 1973, and is buried at New Mount Sinai Cemetery, Affton, Missouri.
