= Christian Wolff =

Christian Wolff may refer to:

- Christian Wolff (philosopher) (1679–1754), German philosopher and mathematician
- Christian Wolff (baroque composer) (1705–1773), German composer
- Christian Wolff (composer) (born 1934), American composer of experimental classical music
- Christian Wolff (actor) (born 1938), German actor
- Christian Wolff, alias of the main character in the 2016 American action thriller film The Accountant and its sequel

== See also ==
- Christian Wolf, board game designer
- Christian Wulff (born 1959), president of Germany, 2010–2012
- Christian Wulff (disambiguation)
