= Amaliegade 37 =

Building in Copenhagen, Denmark

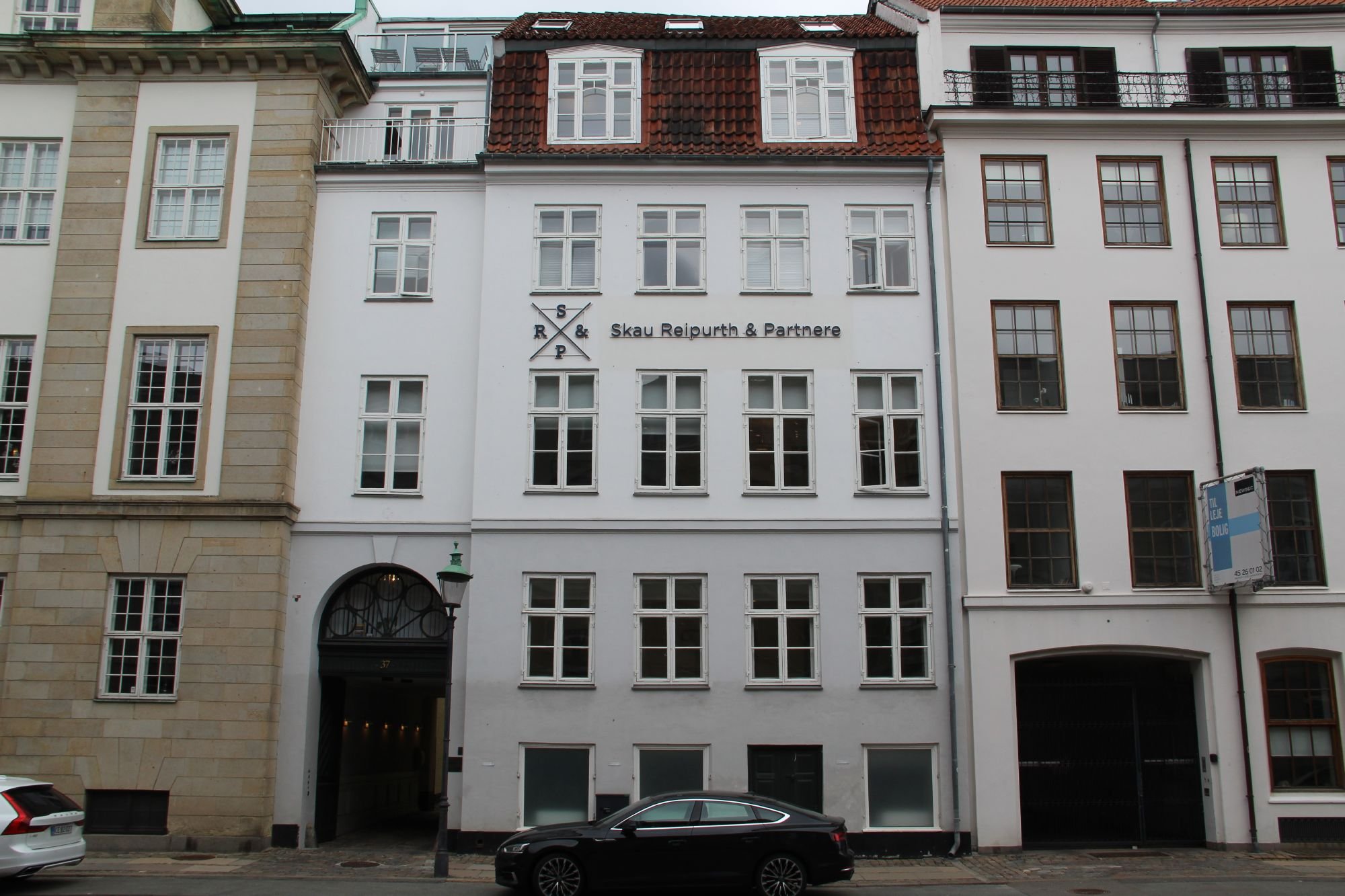
- Interactive map of the Amaliegade 37 area

General information
- Location: Copenhagen, Denmark
- Coordinates: 55°41′13.16″N 12°35′43.61″E
- Completed: 1783

Design and construction
- Architect: Caspar Frederik Harsdorff

Amaliegade 37 is a Neoclassical property in the Frederiksstaden district of central Copenhagen, Denmark. Skau Reipurth, a law firm, has been based in the building since 2014. It was listed on the Danish registry of protected buildings and places in 1951.

== History ==
=== 18th century ===
The site was in 1756 part of Copenhagen Botanical Garden. The house was built by court architect Caspar Frederik Harsdorff for his own use in 1782. He ran into financial troubles shortly thereafter and had to sell the property. In 1806, it was owned by a grocer (høker) named Johannes Sørensen.

=== 19th century ===
In the new cadastre of 1806, the property was listed as No. 141. It was by then owned by grocer (høker) Johannes Sørensen.

At the time of the 1834 census, No. 141 was home to four households. Gunild Elis Havn, the 46-year-old widow of a captain in the Royal Danish Navy, resided on the ground floor with her four children (aged eight to 16), a maid and the lodger Joseph von Halle. Christiane Frederikke Christensen and Birthe Hansen, two widows aged 48 and 58, resided with a maid on the first floor. Emilius Ferdinand Hansen (1797-1874), a theologian who was the same year appointed as pastor of Fjellerup, resided on the second floor with his wife Anne Marie Hansen, their two children (aged six and eight) and one maid. Cathrine Clementine Hansen, a 49-year-old widow, resided in the basement with her four children (aged 14 to 24).

At the time of the 1840 census, the residents had changed in all four apartments. Henrik Mogensen, a carpenter, resided on the ground floor with his wife A6bye,-KvindeMaren Sæbye and their two daughters (aged four and 11). Eliza Christmas, widow of the merchants John Christmas and Philip Ryan, resided on the first floor with her daughter Caroline Ferrall and one maid. Henrik Hansen, a retired captain of the Royal Danish Army, resided on the second floor with his Maria Lund, their 10-year-old daughter, a male servant and two maids. Anders Jørgensen, a grocer (høker), resided in the basement with his wife Kirstine Petersen.

At the time of the 1845 census, No. 141 was home to four households. Johan Christian Hjelte, a teacher at the Army Cadet Academy, resided in the building with his Sophie Magdalene Hjelte and one maid. Magdalene Elisabeth Sommers, the widow of a colonel, resided in the building with her daughter Wilhelmine Angelique Sophie Georgine Sommers, 26-year-old Gerhard Colbiørnsenm 27-year-old Fritz Colbiørnsen and one maid. Jakobine Haagensen, the proprietor of a tavern in the basement, resided in the associated dwelling with her four children (aged 13 to 29) and one maid. Jens Nielsen Monberg, a grocer (høker), resided in the building with his wife Petrea Monberg, their three-year-old son, one maid and one lodger.

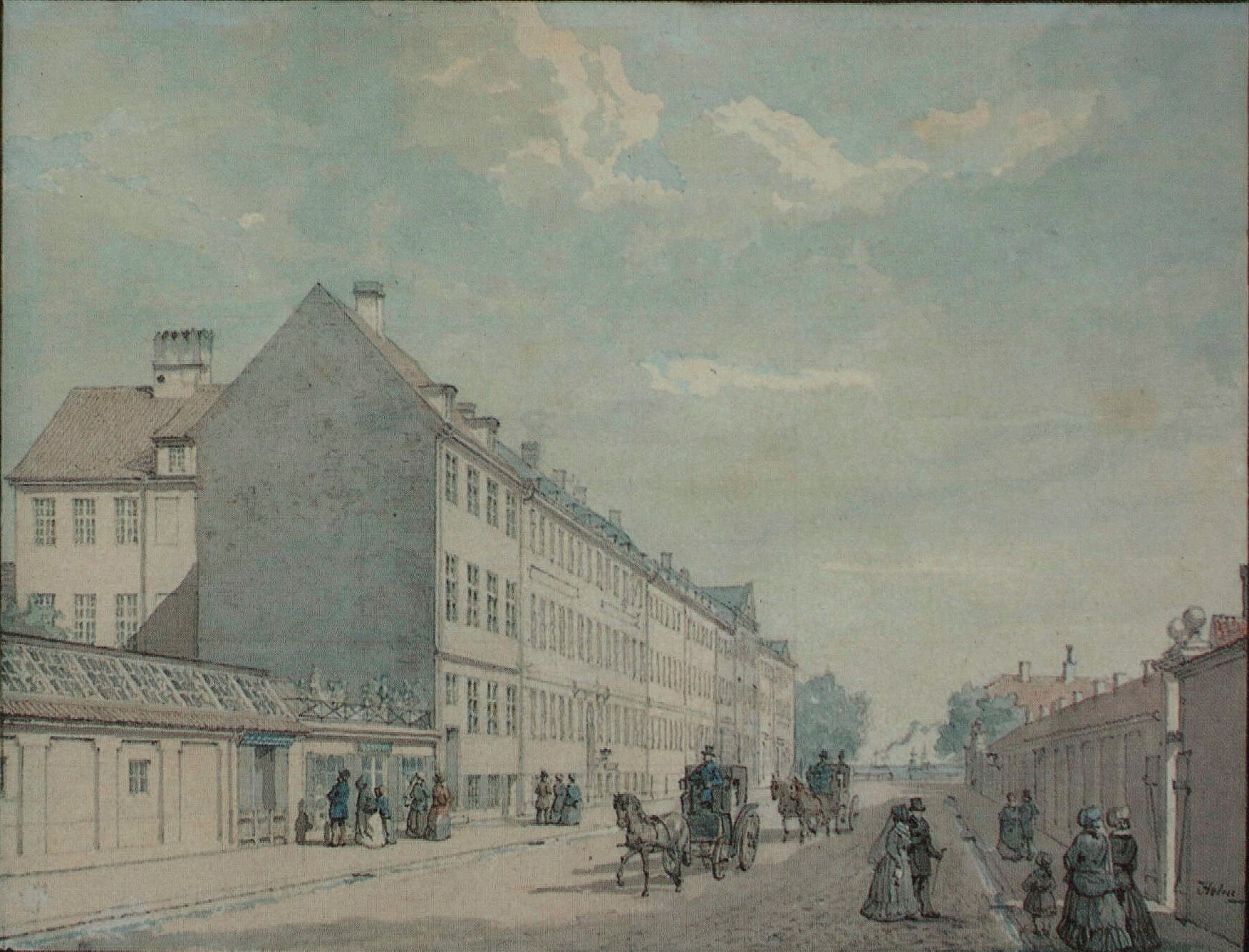
The building in the middle of the 19th century.

Christian Wulff, a naval officer and friend of the writer Hans Christian Andersen, lived in the building for a few years in the 1840s. Wulf knew Andersen through his parents, P. E. Wulff (1774-1842) and Henriette Wulf. Andersen stayed with him at Amaliegade 37 (then No. 141) for almost two months in 1848. He arrived on 27 June and left for Glorup Manor on 24 August before renting three rooms at Nyhavn 67 on his return to Copenhagen.

The politician Jacob Brønnum Scavenius Estrup lived in the apartment on the first floor from 1807 to 1810. He died at Kongsdal in 1912.

== Architecture ==
The building consists of three storeys over a high cellar and has a Mansard roof with red tile. The building is five bays wide. The wider, slightly recessed gateway wing dates from an extension in 1921. A narrow side wing extends from the rear side of the building.

== Today ==
The law firm Skau Reipurth & Partnere has been based in the building since 1 April 2014.

== See also ==
- HDMS Bellona (1830)
