= Jens Juel (1897–1978) =

Danish estate owner (1897–1978)

Jens Juel (28 April 1897 – 25 December 1978) was a Danish estate owner, chamberlain and Member of the Royal Hunt. He was from 1938 the owner of Petersgaard at Vordingborg, including the vast Pedersgaard Forest District. He was a board member of the Danish Forrest Association (1959–1965). He served as director both of Den Suhrske Stiftelse (1940–1962) and of Det Classenske Fideicommis (1948–1974).

== Early life and education ==
Juel was born on 28 April 1897 at Meilgaard, the son of Niels Joachim Christian Gregers Iuel and Clara Anna Sofie Treschow. He graduated from Stenhus Boarding School at Holbæk in 1915. He studied farming at Krabbesholm, Brattingsborg and Petersgaard. From 1922 to 1939, he served as inspector at Krabbesholm and Lindegård.

== Career ==
In 1938, he succeeded Ida Marie Suhr, a younger sister of his maternal grandmother, as the owner of Petersgaard. The estate comprised the vast Petersgaard Forest District. From 1947 to 1966, he was a board member of the Danish Forest Association. From 1959 to 1965, he served as the Danish Forest Association's representative on the Hunting Commission. He was also active on the board of A/S Dansk Skovindustri, from 1957 to 1961 as vice chairman. From 1947 onwards, he was a board member of Kryolith Mine- og Handels Selskabet (vice-chairman from 1951).

From 1940 to 1962, Juel served as director of Den Suhrske Stiftelse. From 1948 to 1974, he served as director of Det Classenske Fideicommis. From 1943 to 1946, he was a member of Kalvehave Parish Council. From 1945 to 1956, he was a board member of Landsforeningen Dansk Arbejde's Vordingborg chapter.

== Personal life ==
Juel married Clara Treschow (28 February 1901 – 31 May 1983), daughter of Frederik Treschow and his wife Olga née Uhlendorff, on 18 October 1921 in Frydendal Church. The couple had four children.

== Awards ==
- 1940: Member of the Royal Hunt (Hofjægermester)
- 11 March 1954: Chamberlain
