= Hans Ditmar Frederik Feddersen =

Danish civil servant, politician and governor

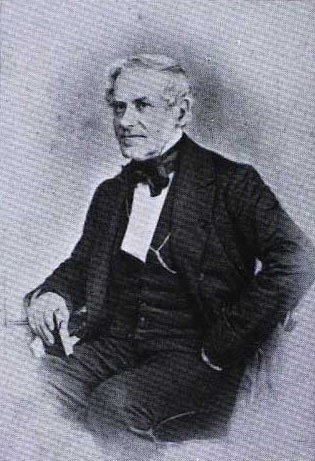
Frederik (Fritz) Feddersen.

Hans Ditmar Frederik (Fritz) Feddersen (2 July 1805 – 12 May 1863) was a Danish civil servant and politician. He served as Governor of the Danish West Indies from 1851 to 1855. In 1860, he was elected as Member of Folketinget in Copenhagen's 3rd Constituency.

== Early life and education ==
Feddersen was born on 2 July 1805 in Copenhagen, the son of civil servant (kontorchef) in Rentekammeret Peter Feddersen (1765–1845) and Margrethe Tersling (1779-1836). His father would later become county manager in Rendsborg with the title of etatsråd. His mother was the daughter of Hans Terslund, who had owned Vennerslund. Feddersen attended Borgerdyd School, matriculating in 1822. He acquired a law degree from the University of Copenhagen in 1827.

== Career ==
Feddersen started his career as a volunteer at the Supreme Court. In 1830, he became a trainee lawyer (fuldmægtig) at the Attorney General. In 1831, he won the University of Copenhagen's gold medal. In 1832–35, he received a public grant to go on a study trip abroad. In 1835, he became employed as a military prosecutor (auditør) at the King's Livjæger Corps. In 1836, he published Om Asylerne, deres Vigtighed for den arbeidende Stand og deres Betydning i Staten. The latter publication was instrumental in having him appointed as one of the directors of Copenhagen's Poor Authority (Fattigvæsen) in 1837. In 1844–45, he was vice chairman of Industriforeningen (Copenhagen Industrial Society) in Copenhagen. 1841 saw him elected as one of Copenhagen's members of Østifternes Stænderforsamling, whose secretary he became.

On 23 December 1842, Feddersen became a member (kommiteret) of General-Toldkammer- og kommercekollegiet's 3rd Department. In 1838, he joined the Colonial Director's Office (as kommiteret). In 1850, in London, he managed to secure a large state loan that the Second Schleswig War had necessitated on very favourable conditions. The same year, he was installed as acting mayor and chief of police in Schlesvig, and as director of the Institute for the Deaf and Mute.

Feddersen was appointed as Governor of the Danish West Indies in 1851. He left the post in 1855 and returned to Denmark. He was succeeded by Johan Frederik Schlegel. Back in Copenhagen, he joined the management of Sparekassen for Kjøbenhavn og Omegn (1856–62). He was also elected as a Member of Folketinget in Copenhagen's 3rd Constituency.

== Personal life ==
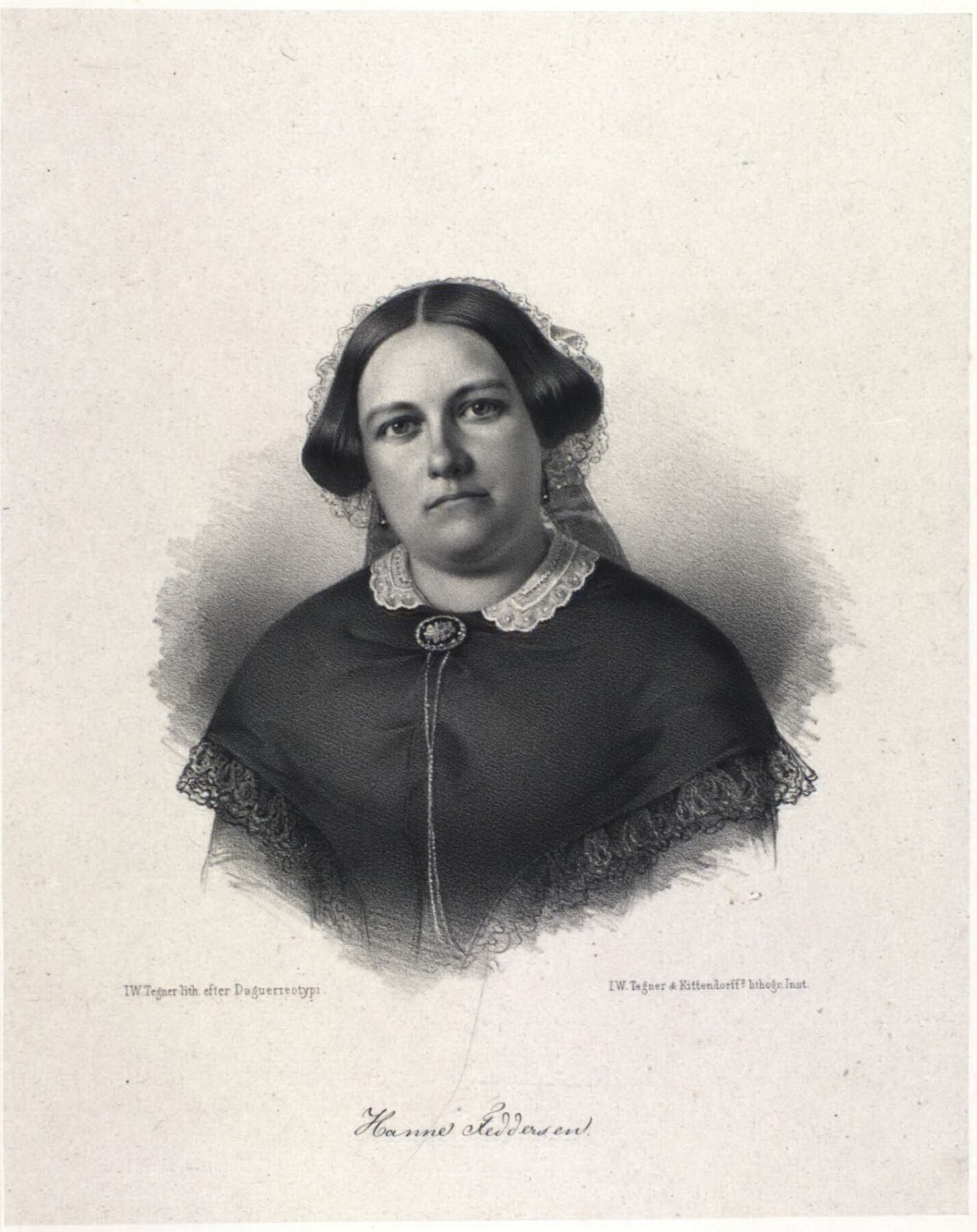
Hanne Feddersen

On 5 December 1840 in Frederiksberg, Feddersen married Ingeborg Cathrine Johanne (Hanne) Jensine Deegen (1816–1853), daughter of Chief Legal Officer (justitsdirektør) of the Supreme Court Colbjørn D. (1778–1830) and Anne Eleonore Margrethe Lemming (1793–1866). She died on 2 February 1853 in Christiansted. He married a second time on 20 March 1858 in Copenhagen to Nanna Felicia Augusta Bilsted (1820–1889), daughter of d. af lawyer and later Attorney General Hans Billested (1774–1830) and Anna Dorothea Munthe af Morgenstierne (1784–1837). Her first marriage to Michael Conrad Fabritius de Tengnagel (1811–49) had left her in the possession of Petersgaard at Vordingborg. Feddersen died on the estate on 12 May 1863. He is buried at St. Peter's Church in Copenhagen. In 1863, Nanna Bilstes sold the estate to Peder Brønnum Scavenius.

== Awards ==
Geddersen was appointed as kancelliråd in 1839 and justitsråd in 1842. He was also awarded the title of chamberlain (kammerherre). In 1850, he was created a Knight in the Order of the Dannebrog. In 1853, he was created a Knight Commander.
