= HMS Tickler (1804) =

Gunvessel of the Royal Navy

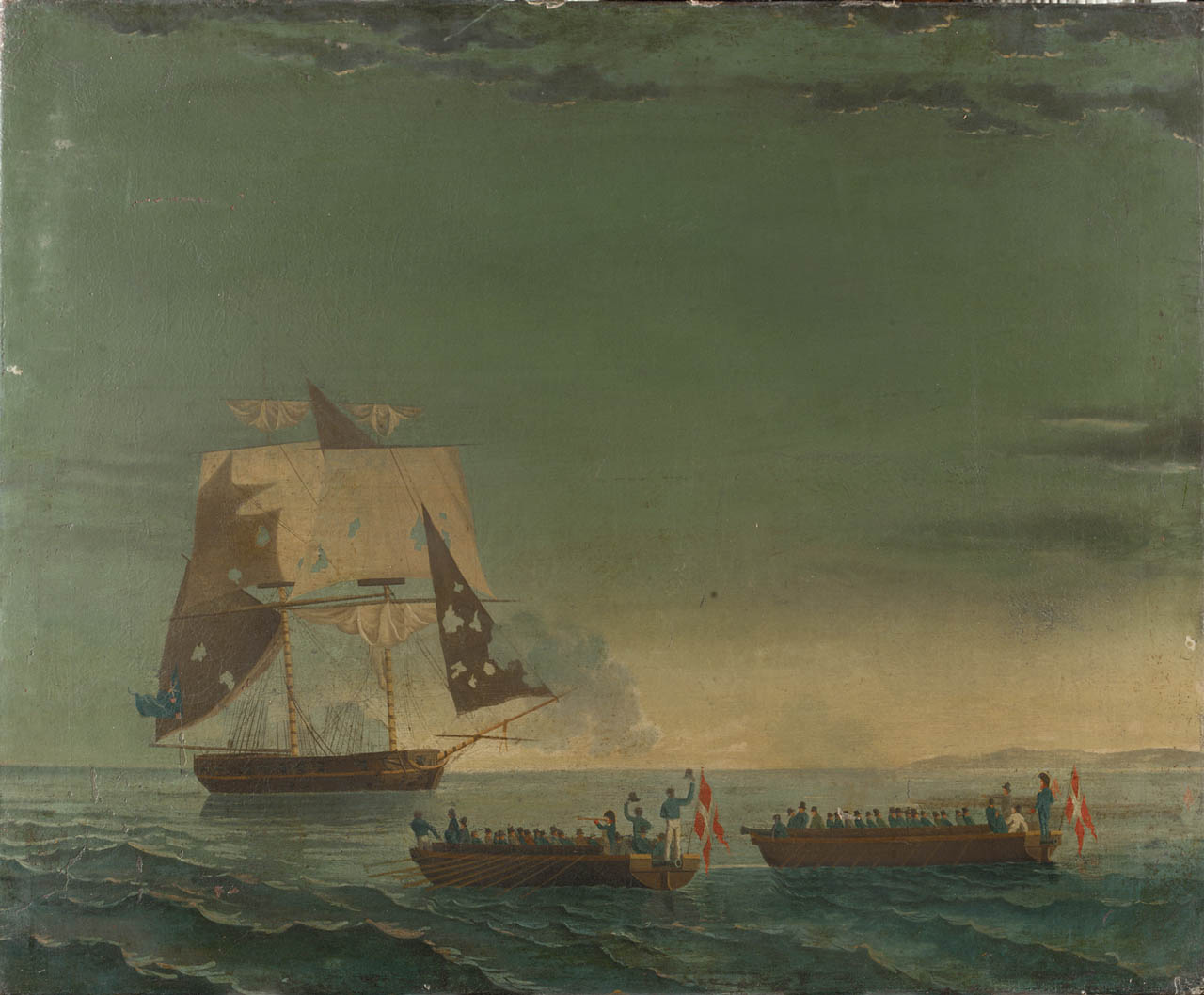
- The capture of HMS Tickler in 1808

History

United Kingdom
- Name: HMS Tickler
- Ordered: 22 March 1804
- Builder: Matthew Warren, Brightlingsea
- Laid down: May 1804
- Launched: 8 August 1804
- Captured: 4 June 1808

Denmark & Norway
- Name: HDMS De Teichler
- Acquired: 1808 by capture
- Renamed: Frederikke Louise (1815)
- Captured: 9 June 1808
- Fate: Naval brig: sold 1815; Mercantile: disposed of 1851

General characteristics
- Class & type: Archer-class gunbrig
- Tons burthen: 17877/94 (bm)
- Length: Overall: 80 ft 3 in (24.5 m); Keel: 65 ft 11 in (20.1 m)
- Beam: 22 ft 7 in (6.9 m)
- Depth of hold: 9 ft 5 in (2.9 m)
- Complement: 50
- Armament: 10 × 18-pounder carronades + 2 chase guns

HMS Tickler was launched in August 1808 at Brightlingsea as a later Archer-class gunbrig. She served in the Channel and the Baltic until the Danes captured her in 1808 during the Gunboat War. They sold her in 1815. From 1815 to 1852 she sailed as Frederikke Louise, first as a merchantman and then from 1843 to 1851 as a sealer.

== Career ==
Lieutenant Charles Irvine commissioned Tickler in August 1804.

In January Tickler was under the command of Lieutenant John Watson Skinner.

On 8 January 1805 Tickler arrived in the Downs with a French officer she had taken out of a fishing boat that had come out of Boulogne Harbour under flag of truce. The French officer was carrying a dispatch from Talleyrand to Lord Harrowby. The dispatch had come express from Paris and the officer was under instructions to contact a British cruiser and then accompany the dispatch to London.

Early in the morning of 24 April 1805, Tickler was part of a squadron under the command of Captain Robert Honyman in HMS Leda. Early in the morning of 24 April 1805, the squadron sighted twenty-six French vessels rounding Cap Gris Nez. Honyman immediately ordered Fury, Harpy, Railleur, Bruiser, Gallant, Archer, Locust, Tickler, Watchful, Monkey, Firm, and Starling to intercept. After a fight of about two hours, Starling and Locust had captured seven armed schuyts in an action within pistol-shot of the shore batteries on Cap Gris Nez. (Note: A schuyt was a Dutch flat-bottomed sailboat, broad in the beam, with square stern; usually equipped with leeboards to serve for a keel.) The schuyts were of 25–28 tons burthen, and carried in all 117 soldiers and 43 seamen under the command of officers from the 51st. Infantry Regiment. The French convoy had been bound for Ambleteuse from Dunkirk. On the British side the only casualty was one man wounded on Archer. The seven schuyts were:

- Schuyt No. 52, under the command of a Sub-Lieutenant of Infantry Loriol, armed with three 24-pounders;
- Schuyt No. 48, under the command of A. Joron of the 51st the Infantry, armed with two 6-pounders, one 24-pounder and one brass howitzer;
- Schuyt No. 57, under the command of Lieutenant Loriol of 51st Infantry, armed with one 24-pounder and two 6-pounders;
- Schuyt No. 45, an unarmed transport, under the command of Sub-Lieutenant Litner of the 51st Infantry, armed with one 24-pounder, one 12-pounder and one 6-pounder;
- Schuyt No. 3. under the command of Mr. Calder, the senior commander, who left her before the British took possession of her;
- Schuyt No. 54, under the command of Sub-Lieutenant Bragur of the 51st Infantry, armed with one 24-pounder and two 6-pounders;
- Schuyt No.43, Sub-Lieutenant Billa of the 51st Infantry, armed with one 24-pounder and two 6-pounders.

The next day Archer brought in two more schuyts, No.s 44 and 58, each armed with one 24-pounder and two 12-pounders. On 25 April 1805 Railleur towed eight of the French schuyts into the Downs. Starling, which had received a great deal of damage, followed Railleur The next day Archer brought in two more schuyts, No.s 44 and 58, each armed with one 24-pounder and two 12-pounders. On 25 April 1805 Railleur towed eight of the French schuyts into the Downs. Starling, which had received a great deal of damage, followed Railleur in.

Blazer, Bustler, and Tickler shared in the proceeds of the detention on 27 August 1807 of Hausstind, Auroe, master.

On 1 September Tickler sent into Dover Justicia, Jensen, master, which had been sailing from Christiana to Portsmouth. Later that month Tickler detained and sent into Portsmouth Juckinthat, from Norway.

On 16 October Tickler arrived at Elsinore from the Nore, with a convoy.

On 14 December 1807, HMS Astraea captured the French privateer lugger Providence. At the time of the capture, the sloop-of-war Royalist had joined the pursuit and gun-brigs Wrangler and Tickler were in sight.

=== Capture ===
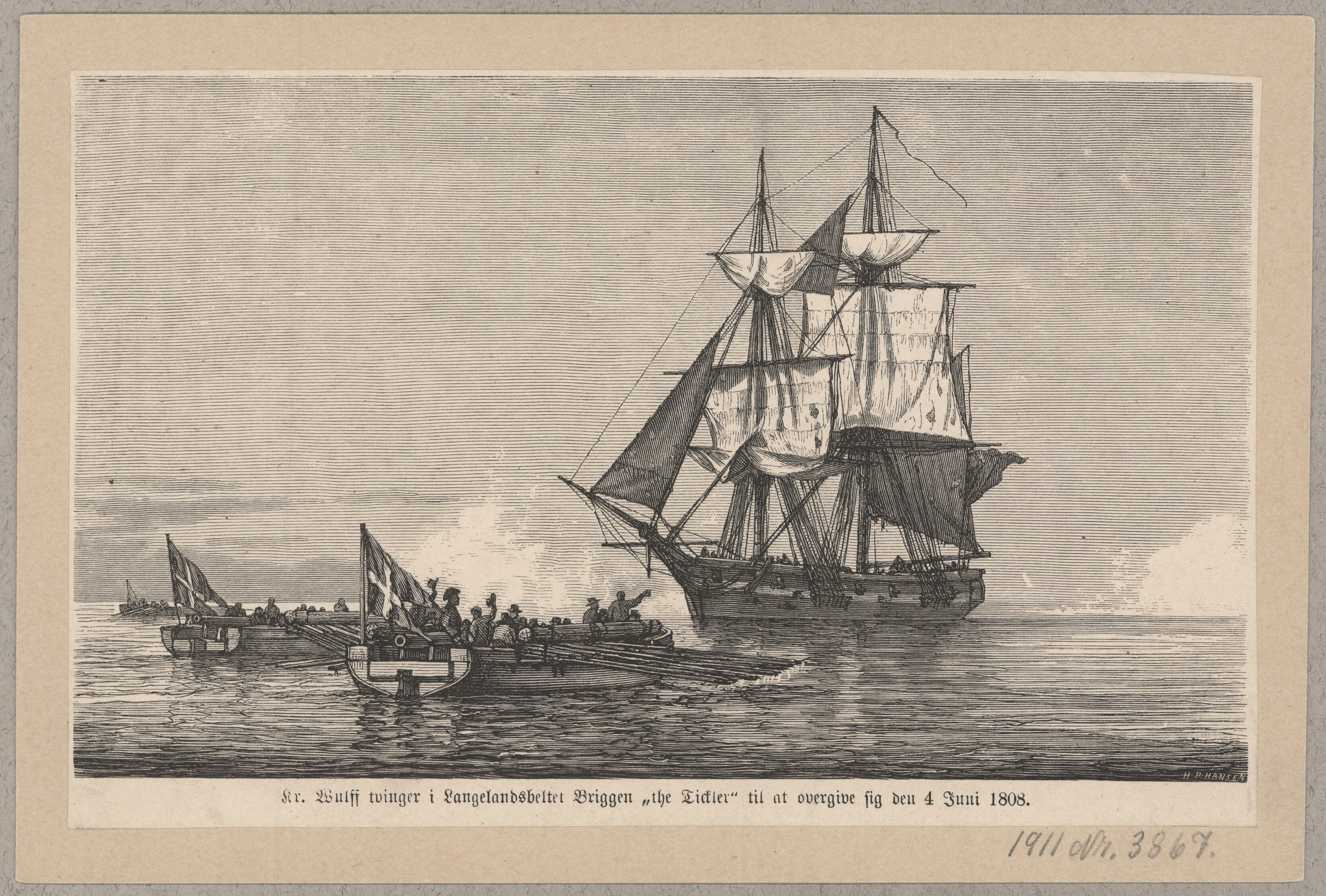
Hans Hansen: Christian Wulff capturing the Tickler, 1808.

On 3 June 1808 Tickler was cruising in the Great Belt when she encountered two Danish gunboats. After a 45-minute engagement, the Danes withdrew. The next day the two gunboats could be seen close to land, and four more gunboats were seen off Lolland and rowing towards Tickler. A lack of wind prevented Tickler from manoeuvring, and gave the gunboats an advantage. The four gunboats opened fire at 2:45p.m., and Tickler responded with her bow chasers. Early in the engagement a grapeshot struck Lieutenant Skinner in the head, killing him. Sub-Lieutenant James Sheppheard then assumed command. At 7:15p.m. Sheppheard was forced to strike. Tickler had suffered one man killed and seven men wounded, while her hull was riddled with holes and her rigging was in tatters. Danish casualties were reportedly minimal. The Danish gunboats were under the command of Lieutenant Christian Wulff.

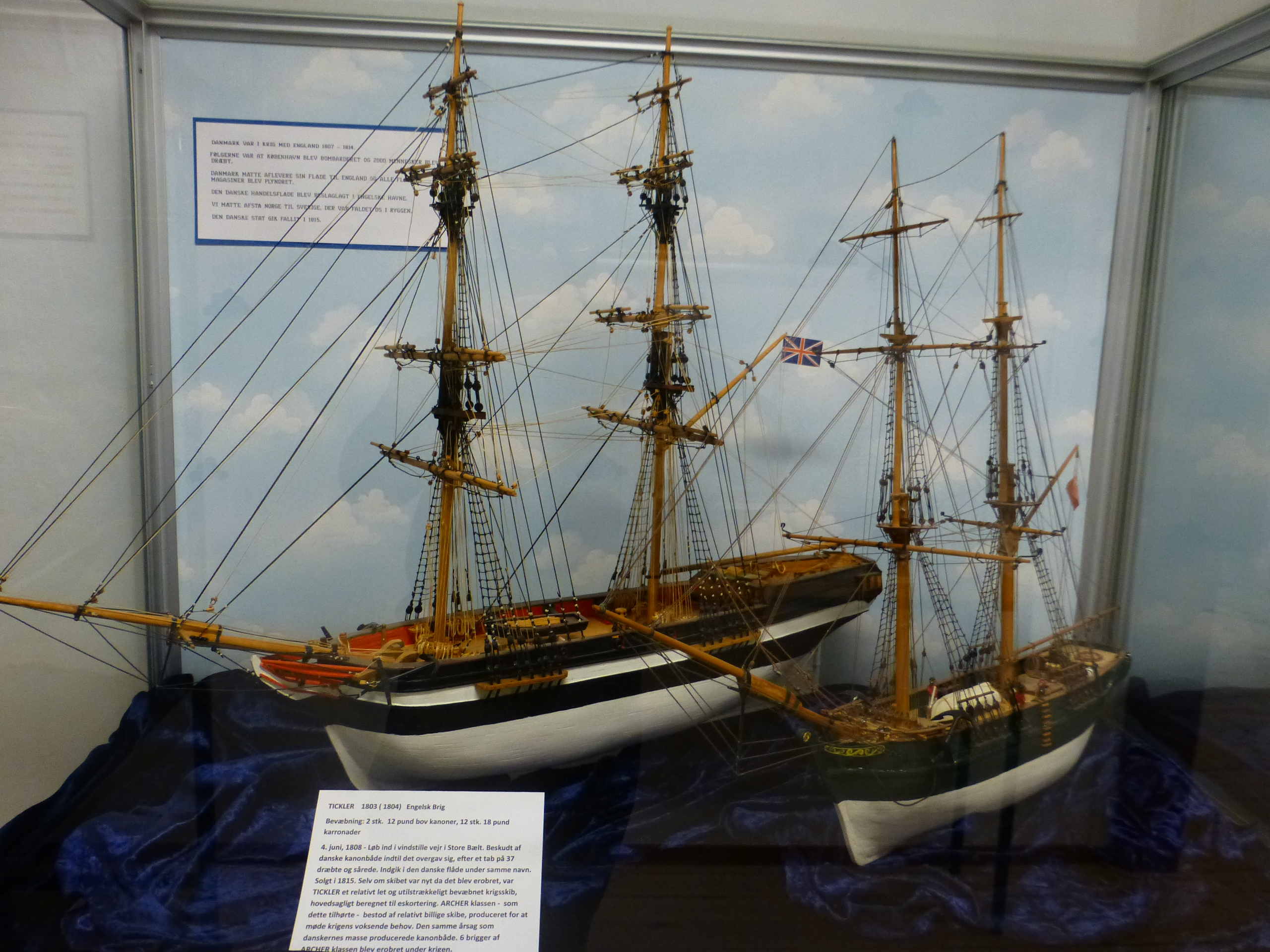
Model of the brig Tickler.

An erroneous report in Lloyd's List conflated the captures of Turbulent and Tickler, though actually the capture of Turbulent occurred five days later, on 9 June.

== Danish career ==
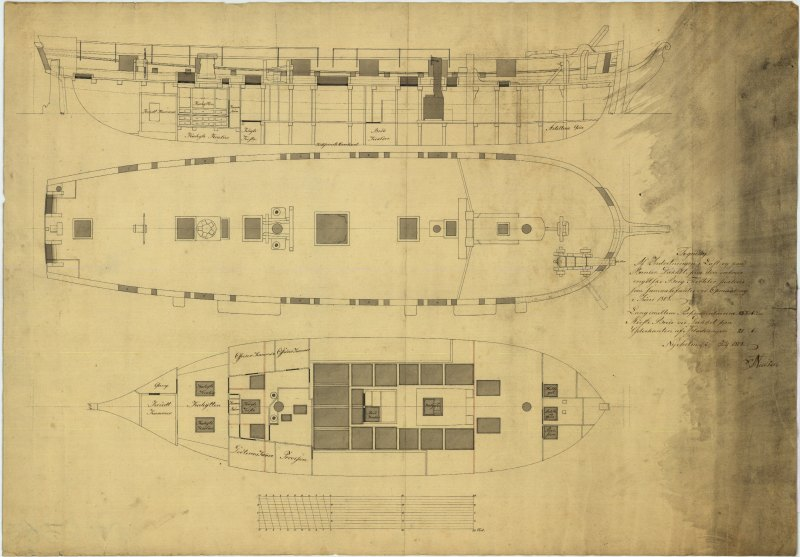
The plans of HMS Tickler that the Danish Navy made after capturing her in 1808

The Danes referred to Tickler as "Den erobrede engelske Brig Tiechler" (the captured brig Tiechler). The Danish Navy sold her in 1815.

From 1815 to 1842 she was the Copenhagen merchant ship Frederikke Louise. Tickler reappeared in Lloyd's Register (LR) in the volume for 1839 as a British-built brig of 164 tons (bm), with homeport of Copenhagen, named Fredericke Louise.

Year	Master	Owner	Trade	Source & notes
1839	A.Bohintz	CH Smith	"Gns."–Cette	LR; large repair 1837

Frederikke Louise was sold in 1842 to a company in Rønne, Bornholm that fitted her for seal hunting in the "nordlinge Ishav" (northern ice sea). However, her entry continued unchanged until 1843 when she disappeared from the register. Between 1842 and 1851 she was a Bornholm-based sealer. The following data is from Jørgensen.

Year	Seals	Walruses	Other
1843	1700		
1844	1700	6	
1845	840	1	
1846	2350		58 barrels of blubber
1847	3600		
1848	Not available		
1849	3030		84 barrels of blubber
1850	3490		
1851	5600		148 barrels of blubber
