= Jørgen Peter Frederik Wulff =

Danish naval officer (1808–1881)

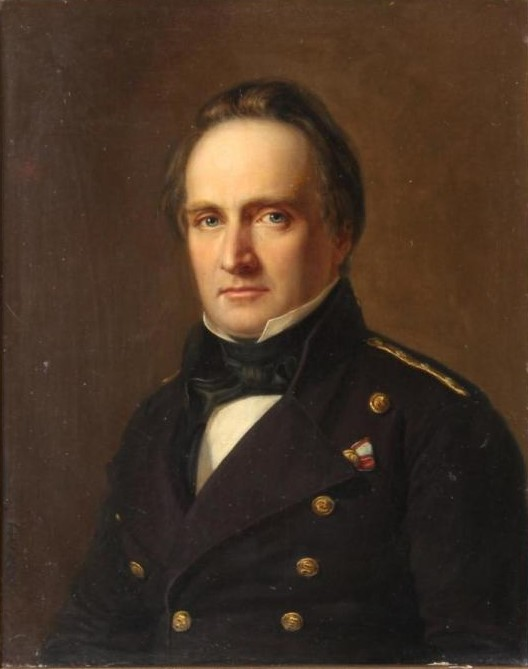
- Born: 6 April 1808; Slagelse, Denmark
- Died: 8 March 1881 (aged 72); Copenhagen, Denmark
- Spouse: Antoinette Christiane
- Military career
- Allegiance: Denmark
- Branch: Royal Danish Navy
- Service years: 1824–1873
- Rank: Admiral
- Conflicts: First Schleswig War: Battle of Eckernförde; Battle of Heligoland; Second Schleswig War: Battle of Jasmund
- Awards: Commander of the Order of the Dannebrog

Admiral Jørgen Peter Frederik Wulff (6 April 1808 – 8 March 1881) was a Danish naval officer.

== Early life ==
Wulff was born on 6 April 1808 in Slagelse, the son of Peter Frederik Wulff and Hanne Henriette Wulff née Weinholdt (1784–1836). His paternal uncle was Christian Wulff.

== Career ==
Wulff became a cadet in 1819 and a second lieutenant in 1824. He visited the Danish West Indies with the frigate Diana in 1825–26. On his return to Denmark, he was freed from service to join the French navy. The Danish navy was still under reconstruction after the war and, financing being tight, the navy could not afford to build ships and at the same time equip and sail with them. To maintain the naval officers' training, many of them were therefore allowed to sail in foreign navies, including the French Navy. In Toulon, Wulff was dispatched to service aboard the corvette La Bayadére in the Levant. In Smyrna, he was transferred to the schooner L'Estafette whose task it was to eliminate the Greek pirates in the area. He then served on the corvette L'Echo. In 1830, he served in the French conquest of Algeria. In 1831, he served aboard the frigate Hermione on its voyage to the West Indies.

He was then called back to Denmark where he became a teacher at the Royal Cadet Academy. In 1832–33, he was dispatched to service aboard the brig St. Croix in the Danish West Indies. He reached the rank of first lieutenant in 1833. In 1834, he was stationed as enrollment officer at Fehmarn but was freed from service to recuperate in the south. In 1836, he served on the ship of the line Skiold . In 1837, he served as second-in-command on the Altona guardship Elben. He distinguished himself during a fire in the village of Wedel. Later that same year he was granted four years freedom from service to command C. H. Donner's merchant brig Elisabeth on a voyage to Buenos Aires. The ship was involved in a collision in the English Cannel, but Wulff managed to ground it before it sank.

In 1841, he reached the rank of captain lieutenant and served as commander of the steam vessel Kiel, which was used by the king on his visit to the Danish West Coast islands and picked up Princess Mariane at Rostock.

In 1842–45, Wulff served as customs officer on the east coast of Jutland. In 1846, he served as second-in-command on the frigate Gefion in the Atlantic Ocean and Baltic Sea. The crown prince participated in the first half of the voyage while his divorce was sorted out. The ship called at Cádiz and Madeira. In 1847, Wulff was granted permission to travel to Malchin in Mecklenburg.

During the First Schleswig War, he initially served as second-in-command of the Danish fleet at the west coast of Sønderjylland and later as commander of the steam ship Geiser. The ship participated in the Battle of Eckernförde on 5 April 1849. In 1850, the ship was in combat with slesvig-holstenske gunboats off Smaldyb.

In 1850, Wulff reached the rank of captain. After the end of the war, he was a member of the Construction and Regulation Commission (konstruktions- og regleringskommissionen) from 1850 to 1870. In 1851, he travelled to Paris and London. He was commander of the frigate Havfruen in 1853 and of the frigate Bellona in 1854. He commanded the corvette Heimdal on its maiden voyage in 1857 and the corvette Thor on an expedition to the Mediterranean Sea in 1859. He reached the rank of kommandørkaptajn in 1857 and orlogskaptajn in 1858.

Wulff served as commander of the ship of the line Skiold in 1861 and again in 1864. He participated in the Battle of Rugen. He reached the rank of commander in 1868 and was appointed as flådeinspektør in 1869. He was commander of the pansereskadren in 1870 and reached the rank of admiral in the year of his retirement from the navy in 1873.

== Personal life ==
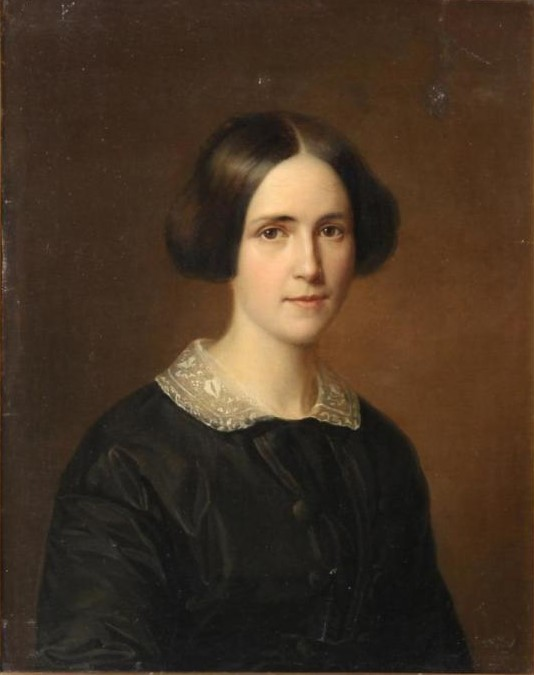
Antoinette Christiane

Wulff married Antoinette Christiane Birch (1823–1892) on 28 December 1843. They had two daughters, Ida Antoinette Wulff (1845–1924) and Marie Henriette Wulff (1847–1927). Ida Antionette Wulff married barrister and politician Octavius Hansen.
