= Ida Marie Suhr =

Danish philanthropist and estate owner (1853–1938)

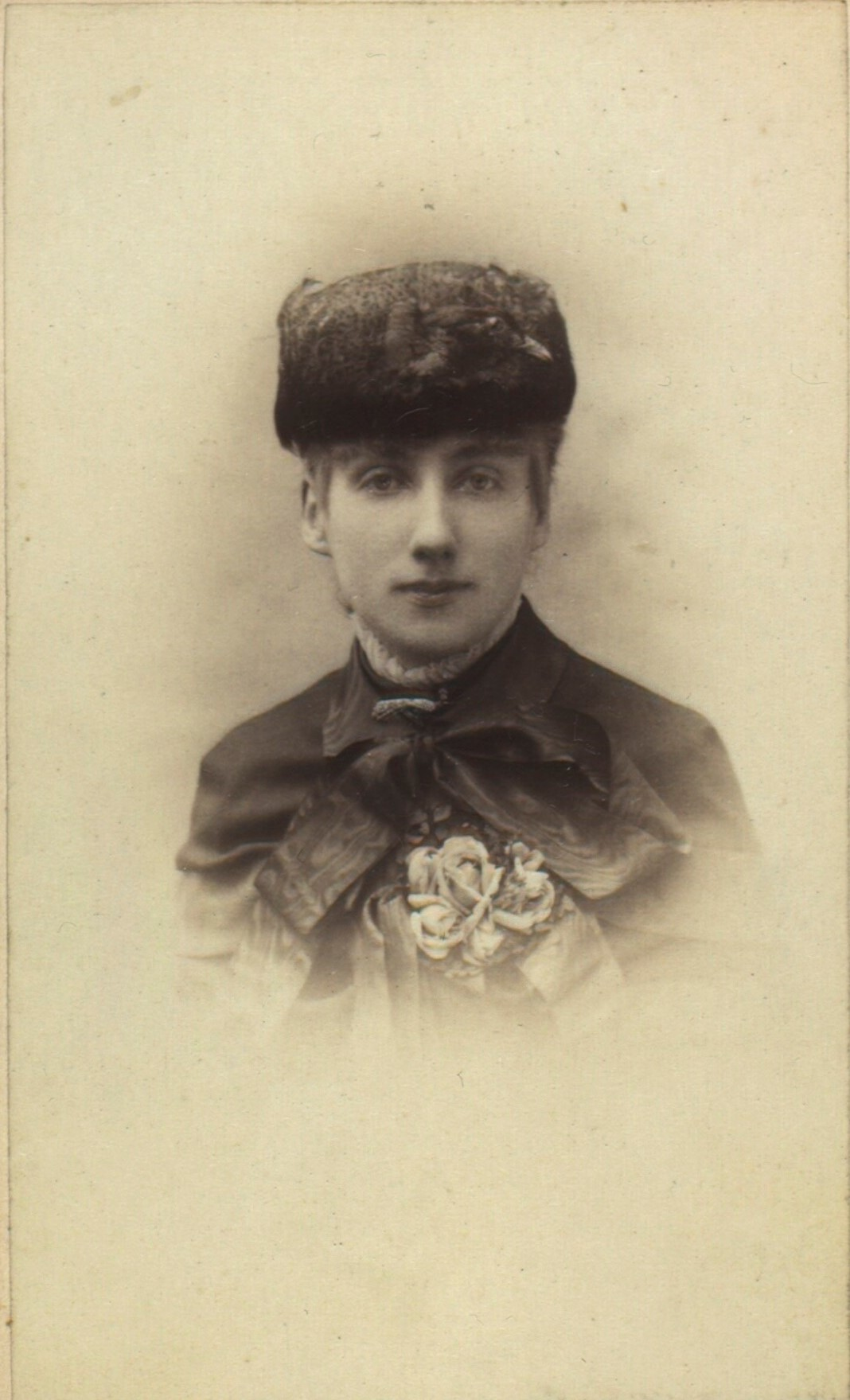
Ida Marie Suhr (1892)

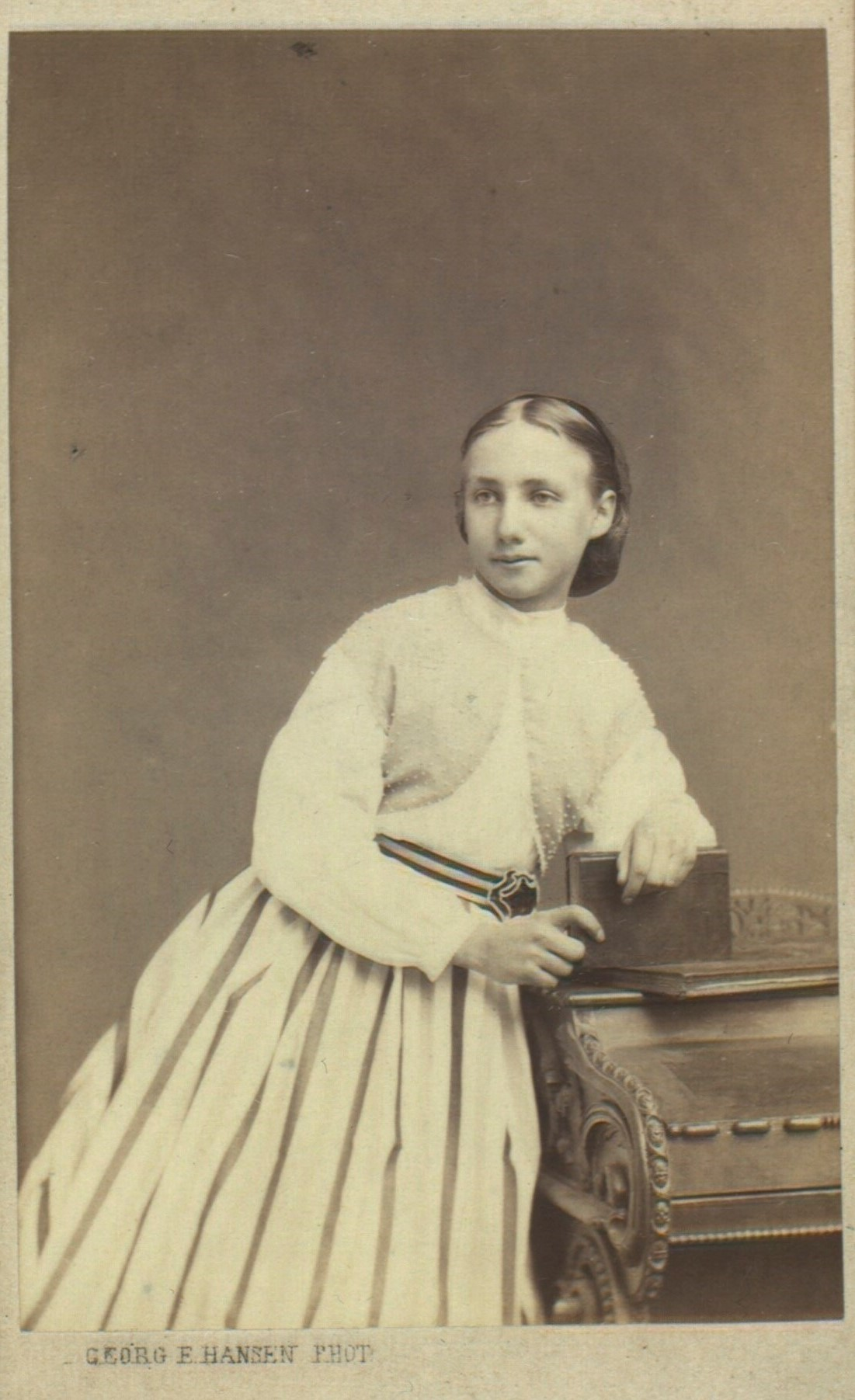
Ida Marie Suhr (1869)

Ida Marie Suhr (1853–1938) was a wealthy Danish philanthropist and estate owner. She is remembered for her associations with the Skagen Painters, in particular Anna and Michael Ancher, whom she met during annual visits to Skagen and invited to stay with her at Petersgaard Manor in southern Zealand. In addition to the houses she built for those working on her estate, she funded an old people's home in nearby Langebæk and a convalescent home in Copenhagen.

== Biography ==
Born on 5 October 1853 in Copenhagen, Ida Marie Suhr was the daughter of the prosperous merchant Ole Berendt Suhr (1813–1875) and Ida Marie Bech (1825–1897), the fourth of the six children in the family.

In addition to Petersgaard, Ida Marie Suhr had a fine residence in the Suhr House on Gammeltorv in central Copenhagen, where she spent the winters. She probably first visited Skagen in the 1890s or early 1900s, staying in Brøndums Hotel which was closely associated with the Skagen Painters. She continued to return every year until 1937. She became a friend of the Brøndoms, Anchers, Tuxens and of King Christian X and Queen Alexandrine. In connection with the royal couple, it is said that while visiting her in her Copenhagen residence, the king lit a cigarette. In no uncertain terms, Suhr responded: "Your Majesty, in this house you only smoke when you are invited." And he immediately extinguished his cigarette.

She used to arrive at Skagen in a large chauffeur-driven car which she also used to go to church each Sunday, sitting in the front row while her uniformed chauffeur sat at the back. Deeply interested in the arts, in 1909 she presented an altarpiece by Joakim Skovgaard to Skagen Church. In return for her visits to Skagen, she invited several of the artists to stay with her at Petersgaard, where they could go hunting, or in Copenhagen. Suhr's lengthy correspondence with Michael Ancher is preserved at Petersgaard.

In addition to her contacts with the Skagen Painters, Suhr is remembered for her good works. She had attractive housing built for those who worked on her estate, established an old people's home in Langebæk and built a large convalescent home for the City of Copenhagen.

Ida Marie Suhr died on 9 August 1938 at Petersgaard near Kalvehave.

== See also ==
- Nelly Erichsen
- Bodil Neergaard
