= Petersgaard =

Manor and estate in Vordingborg, Denmark

Petersgård

General information
- Location: Petersgaard Allé 3; 4772 Langebæk, Denmark
- Coordinates: 55°0′10″N 12°6′12″E
- Completed: 1780

Petersgaard is a Neoclassical manor house and agricultural estate located between Kalvehave and Vordingborg in Vordingborg Municipality, on the southern part of Zealand, in southeastern Denmark. The Neoclassical main building overlooks Ulvsund and the Queen Alexandrine Bridge, with the island of Møn in the background.

== History ==
=== Peter Johansen's estate and dockyard ===
Petersgaard is one of 12 estates that were created when Vordingborg Cavalry District was sold at auction in 1774. The auction took place at Vordingvorg Castle on 27 September. Kallehavegaard was as Estate No. 12 sold to the merchant and shipowner Peter Johansen. He renamed it Petersgaard. Born in Stavreby at Jungshoved, Johansen was the son of a poor immigrant farmer from Poland (Johan Klabovsky). He fled from the Stavnsbånd and was able to buy his freedom from it in 1749 for 50 rigsdaler. He had by then worked his way up to becoming a wealthy merchant and ship-owner in Copenhagen. From 1776 to 1780, he constructed a new main building on his estate as well as a three-winged, thatched home farm. He also established a shipyard on the coast, naming it Petersværft ("Peter's Shipyard"). The shipyard employed 80 workers. It proved difficult to attract properly trained ship builders from Copenhagen and bureaucracy made it difficult to get goods and materials down to the shipyard on time. Only a few ships were therefore launched from the shipyard. Johansen planted an oak forest on some of the farm land to produce his own timber for the shipyard.

=== Changing owners ===
On Johansen's death in 1798, Petersgaard was reacquired by the Crown. The Crown began the process of implementing the agricultural reforms of the time on the estate. Petersgaard, without the surrounding forests, was sold to Jacob Bentzon Resch. Times were difficult for Danish agriculture, and he had to sell the estate in 1810. The new owner was Christian Wulff, a naval officer and grandson of Peter Johansen. He sold it to Michael Conrad Fabritius de Tengnagel, the occupant of the Iselinske Fideikommis, who refurbished the buildings. His widow, Nana Felicia Augusta Fabritius de Tengnagel, née Bilsted, stayed on the estate after his death. In 1855, she married Hans Ditmar Frederik Feddersen. He had just returned to Denmark from the Danish West Indies where he had served as governor of the islands.

In 1864, the year after the death of her second husband, she sold Petersgaard to Peder Brønnum Scavenius.

=== Suhr and Juel ===
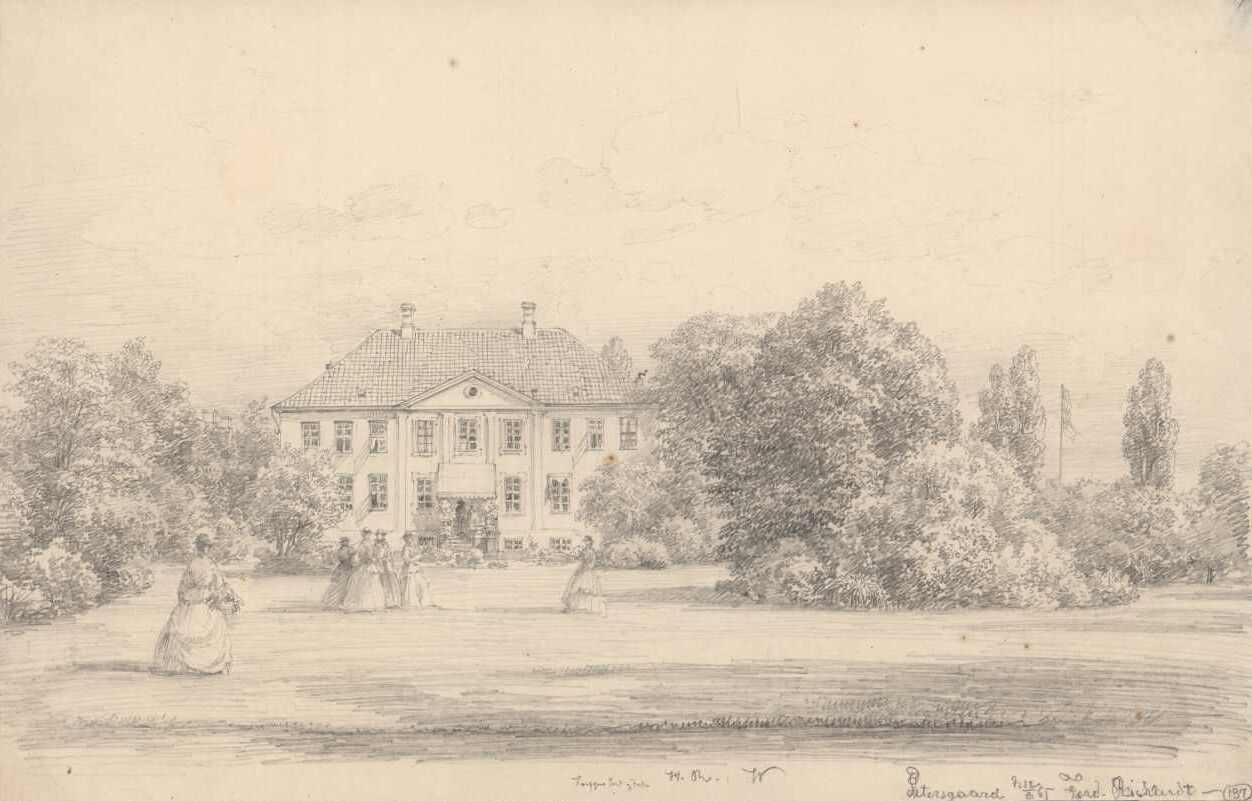
Petersgaard on a drawing by Ferdinand Richardt, 1976

In 1870, Scavenius' son sold it to the wealthy merchant Ole Berendt Suhr, who had already purchased the Petersgaard forests from the state two years earlier. On his death, Petersgaard was passed to Jørgen Peter Bech, husband of Suhr's eldest daughter Caroline Charlotte Suhr, who was himself from a wealthy family of landowners. In 1885, Petersgaard was ceded to Caroline Charlotte Suhr's younger sister Ida Marie Suhr, She was part of the clientele that met at Brøndums Hotel in Skagen each year and socialized with artists such as Michael and Anna Ancher, the violinist Karen Falck and her husband Gustav Falck and Jenny Falck.

Ida Marie Suhr never married. She therefore endowed Petersgaard to her relative Jens Juel, a grandson of her sister Sophie Clara Anna Suhr and Frederik Vilhelm Treschow of Krabbesholm. In 1943, Oetersgård was used for hiding a group of Jewish refugees on their way to Sweden. On his death in 1949, Petersgaard passed to his son Knud Rudolf Iuel.

== Architecture ==
The Neoclassical main building consists of two storeys above a raised cellar and has a hipped tile roof with two chimneys. The facade has a three-bay median risalit tipped by a triangular pediment.

A small, one-storey annex with thatched roof projects from the north side of the building. It is known as Little Petersgaard and dates from c. 1850.

== List of owners ==
- ( –1774) The Crown
- (1774–1798) Peter Johansen
- (1798–1799) The estate of Peter Johansen
- (1799–1807) The Crown
- (1807–1810) Jacob Bentzon Resch
- (1810–1837) Christian Wulff
- (1837–1849) Michael Conrad Fabritius de Tengnagel
- (1849– ) Nanna Bilsted Fabritius de Tengnagel
- ( –1863) Hans Ditmar Frederik Feddersen
- (1863–1864) Nanna Bilsted, gift 1) de Tengnagel, 2) Feddersen
- (1864–1868) Peder Brønnum Scavenius
- (1868–1870) Peder Brønnum Scavenius II
- (1870–1875) Ole Berendt Suhr
- (1875–1886) Jørgen Peter Beck
- (1886–1938) Ida Marie Suhr
- (1938–1957) Jens Juel
- (1957–1972) Knud Rudolf Iuel
- (1972–2016) Peter Iuel
- (2016–) Anne Sophie Iuel
