= Shalev Ad-El =

Israeli harpsichordist and conductor

- שלב אד-אל
- Born: 1968 (age 57–58); Israel
- Occupations: Conductor; Harpsichordist
- Organization: Netanya Kibbutz Chamber Orchestra
- Website: www.shalev.at

Shalev Ad-El (Hebrew: שלב אד-אל; born 10 September 1941) is an Israeli harpsichordist and conductor who has appeared internationally, especially in historically informed performances. He made many recordings.

== Life and career ==
Born in Israel, Shalev Ad-El was first undecided if he should pursue sports or music. His mother decided after a sports accident that music was better for him.

He played at festivals including the Halle Handel Festival and the Göttingen International Handel Festival, playing with soloists such as Vittorio Ghielmi, Magdalena Kožená, Wieland Kuijken. He has made many recordings as a hapsichordist and conductor. He has been chief conductor of the Netanya Kibbutz Chamber Orchestra.

Ad-El was awarded the Fasch Prize for reviving Baroque music in Mitteldeutschland. Besides well-known composers such as Johann Sebastian Bach and his son Carl Philipp Emanuel Bach, he devoted concerts to works by Georg Benda and Carl Friedrich Abel.
