= Knut Wulff =

Swedish entrepreneur (1913–2002)

Knut Wulff, born 1913 in Malmö, died 2002, was a Swedish entrepreneur and pioneer in the beauty and cosmetics area, who created many successful products and brands within his company Pierre Robert. He was one of the first people across the world of cosmetics, who made his products of the natural vegetable extracts, when he created Fleur de Santé.

== Early life and career ==
Knut Wulff's father, Gustav Wulff, a German hairdresser and perfumer, moved to Malmö, Sweden from Hamburg in 1910, together with his brother Hermann Wulff. After having initially worked at Salong Sauer, he start his own hairdressing salon together with his brother. Later, the Swedish king Gustav V of Sweden, a frequent visitor in Scania, became his prominent customer. Gustav Wulff’s most successful product was an herbal hair tonic for men.

In 1930 Gustav’s 17-year-old son Knut took over his father's salon in Malmö. He later expanded with beauty salons in Stockholm, Gothenburg and Copenhagen. It became an enterprise with eight subsidiaries and eighty employees. Thanks to his summertime hairdressing in Falsterbo from 1937, he had a royal customer just as his father had. He was the first who cut the hair of future king Carl XVI Gustaf, when the prince was a few years old.

== Career in cosmetics ==
Wulff also started production and marketing of his own cosmetics products. This first successful product was the skin lotion LdB, short for Lait de Beauté, French for "beauty milk". This product was created in 1945 in Wulff's cellar, apparently with the aid of a food processor. Wulff was assisted by an Estonian pharmacist by the name Tönnisson when he created LdB and several other products.

Wulff's products were launched in 1946 under the company name Monsieur Robert, which was changed into Pierre Robert in 1964. Wulff claimed that he had purchased a recipe and the production rights from a Monsieur Robert in Paris. The truth of this has been questioned, also by his own son, and probably Wulff simply chose a French-sounding name for marketing reason, since France was associated with luxury and fashion. Pierre Robert was quite successful, in particular in the Swedish market, became a royal purveyor in 1955, and had its larger market share in the 1970s, when the company supplied about half of the hair products and one-third of the cosmetics to the Swedish market.

In 1975 Wulff sold Pierre Robert AB and the company's brands to Unilever, after several years of proposals from Unilever. Wulff stayed on as CEO until his retirement in 1978. Unilever closed down their cosmetics production in Sweden in mid-1990s, and several of Pierre Robert's old brands were purchased in 1998 by Malmö businessman Kent Widding and his company Hardford.

Wulff regretted having sold his company, but considered that it was difficult to continue as owner due to the poor Swedish business climate in the 1970s.

== Founding new company ==
After his retirement, Wulff did not want to leave the cosmetics business, and went into herbal cosmetics, made from natural vegetable extracts. A series of products called Fleur de Santé (French for "flower of health") was developed with the aid of four suppliers. In 1980 the company Fleur de Santé was started, owned half by Knut Wulff, and half by Fortia, the publicly traded holding company of Pharmacia. Fleur de Santés products were sold by mail order, which was an expanding sales channel at this time, and also in some 20 Fleur de Santé shops run as franchises. Fleur de Santé was later purchased by the mail order company Ellos.
