= Ole Berendt Suhr =

Danish merchant, investor, landowner and philanthropist (1813–1875)

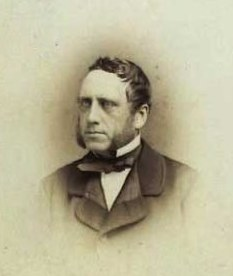
- Ole Bernt Suhr photographed by Georg Emil Hansen
- Born: 3 May 1813; Copenhagen, Denmark
- Died: 6 October 1875 (aged 62); Sølyst, Klampenborg, Denmark
- Occupations: Merchant, investor and landowner
- Awards: Grand Cross of the Dannebrog

Ole Berendt Suhr (3 May 1813 – 6 October 1875) was a Danish merchant, investor, landowner and philanthropist.

== Early life and education ==
Ole Berendt Suhr was born in Nyborg, where his father by the same name was a merchant, and his mother Laurine Marie Müller (1795–1876) was a daughter of the wealthy merchant Rasmus Møller.

Suhr moved to Copenhagen where he studied theology at the University of Copenhagen from 1832 to 1838 while at the same time training as a merchant in the family's trading house J. P. Suhr & Søn, which was managed by his uncle Johannes Theodorus Suhr. He soon won his uncle's respect, and it was therefore decided that he would later take over the company.

== Career ==
On 1 January 1856, Ole Berendt Suhr took over J. P. Suhr & Søn after his uncle, who remained active in the company for another few years. The transaction was partly financed through a cheap loan from Den Suhrske Stiftelse. Trade in coal remained the principal activity of the company but from 1867 he also operated a coke and cinder business at Christiansholm.

In 1856 Suhr began a collaboration with 26-year-old Carl Frederik Tietgen, who had just established a trading house at Gammeltorv after his return from England. They shared an interest in cryolite from Greenland. In 1857, they were both co-founders of the bank Privatbanken where Tietgen served as bank manager while Suhr became vice chairman of the board. Suhr was also a co-founder and board member of the telephone companies that Tietgen established in the 1860s that were later merged into the Great Northern Telegraph Company. He was also a co-founder and board member of Det Forenede Dampskibs-Selskab in 1866 and De Danske Sukkerfabrikker in 1872.

== Property ==
In 1868 Suhr purchased the vast Petersgaard Forest District near Vordingborg from the government for 580,000 Danish rigsdaler. Two years later he also purchased the Petersgaard estate for 245,000 rigsdaler from the son of one of his old business partners.

He was a professional member of the Maritime and Commercial Court (Sø- og handelsretten) from 1861 to 1877. In 1864 he became a member of the committee for Denmark's participation at the World's Fairs at Paris in 1867 and Vienna in 1873.

== Personal life and legacy ==
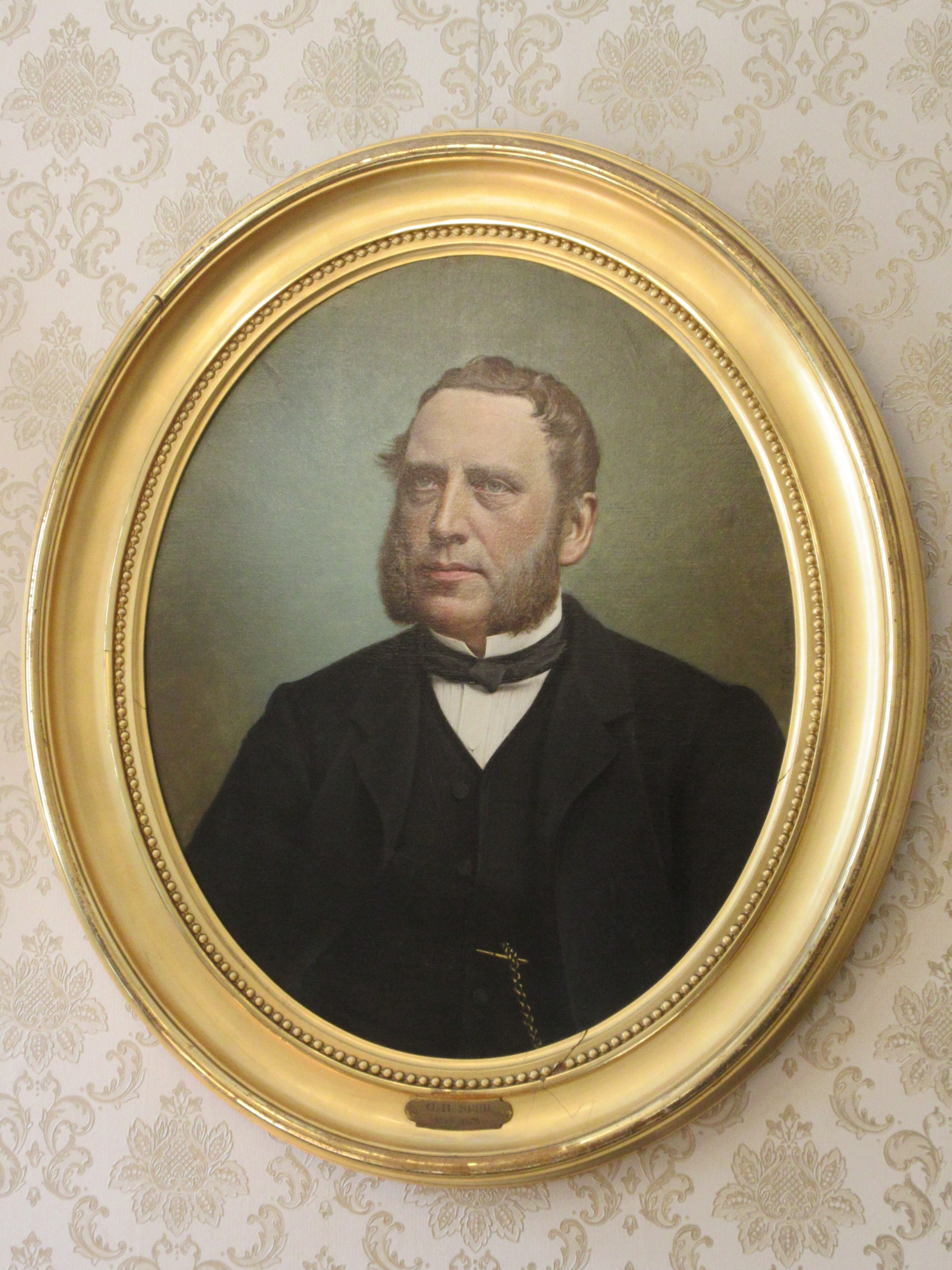
Painting of O. B. Suhr by Carl Bloch on display in the Heering House in Copenhagen

Suhr married Ida Marie Bech (11 April 1825 – 8 August 1897) on 20 September 1847. She was the daughter of Jørgen Peter Bech (1782–1846) and Ellen Sophie Magdalene Bech née Meyer (1784–1846).

In 1873, Suhr was hit by an apoplectic stroke. His widow became the sole owner of the company after his death in 1875, but their son-in-law Andreas Julius Lauritz Holmblad (1852–1896) and longterm associate Svend Wilhelm Isberg (1820–1895) became partners in the company in 1877. The company was dissolved on 22 November 1899.

Suhr's will left an amount for the Health insurance funds in Nyborg and Kalvehave as well as 60,000 rigsdaler for a building with lodging for needy merchants and their widows. De Suhrske Friboliger were subsequently built in Valdemarsgade in Vesterbro.
