= Johnny Wolfe =

U.S. Navy admiral

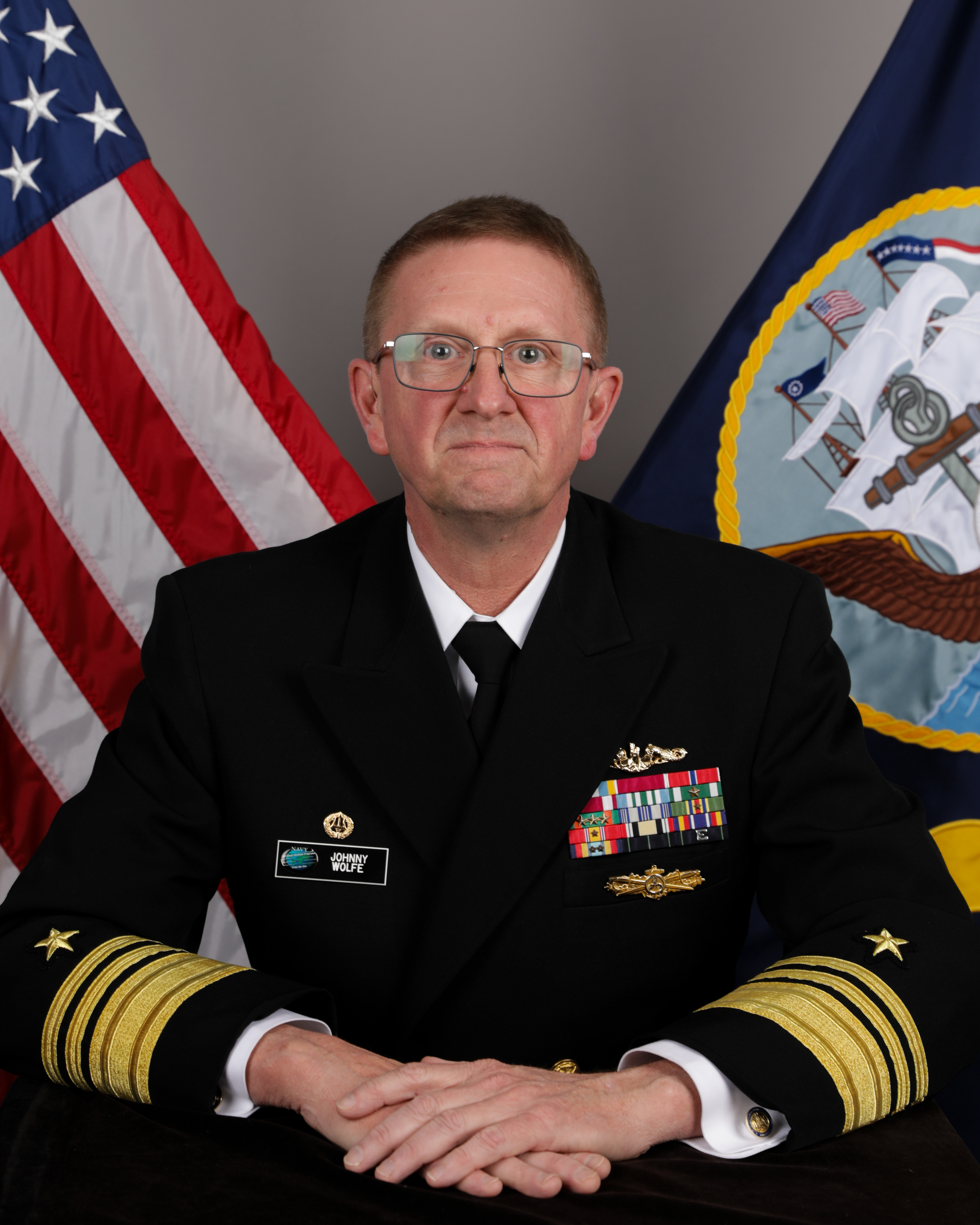
- Born: 7 November 1965 (age 60); Somerset, Texas
- Military career
- Allegiance: United States
- Branch: United States Navy
- Service years: 1988–present
- Rank: Vice Admiral
- Conflicts: Iraq War
- Awards: Defense Superior Service Medal; Legion of Merit; Bronze Star Medal
- Johnny Wolfe's voice Wolfe's opening statement at a House Armed Services Strategic Forces Subcommittee hearing on the FY2024 nuclear forces budget request Recorded 28 March 2023

Johnny Ray Wolfe Jr. (born 7 November 1965) is a United States Navy vice admiral who currently serves as the Director for Strategic Systems Programs. Previously, he was the Program Executive Officer for Aegis Ballistic Missile Defense of Missile Defense Agency. Wolfe attended the United States Merchant Marine Academy, graduating with a Bachelor of Science degree in marine systems engineering in 1988. He later earned a Master of Science degree in applied physics at the Naval Postgraduate School.

== Personal ==
Wolfe is the son of Johnny Ray Wolfe Sr. (29 September 1943 – 30 June 2002) and Frances Jean (McCabe) Wolfe. The couple were married on 21 March 1964, and had two sons.

Wolfe Jr. is married to Anne Wolfe, and they also have two sons.

Military offices
Preceded by ???	Program Executive Officer for Aegis Ballistic Missile Defense of Missile Defense Agency; 2014–2018	Succeeded by Tom Druggan
Preceded by Terry J. Benedict	Director for Strategic Systems Programs; 2018–present	Incumbent
