= Christian Wolff (baroque composer) =

Baroque composer

Christian Wolff (Naundorf, 1705 – Dahlen, 1773) was a German baroque composer. He studied in Dresden and Leipzig and then was first kapellmeister then rector and organist in Dahlen.

== Works, editions and recordings ==
23 cantatas survive in Mügeln, Nuremberg, and Rossach.

- Cantata Mit Fried und Freud ich fahr dahin (on Luther's hymn) Klaus Mertens, Accademia Daniel, cond. Shalev Ad-El, 2007.
- Cantata Ihr Sorgen lasset mich zufrieden Klaus Mertens, Accademia Daniel, cond. Ad-El.
- Cantata Meinens bleibens ist nicht hier Klaus Mertens, Accademia Daniel, cond. Ad-El.
