= Christian Wulff (1810–1856) =

Danish naval officer (1810–1856)

- Born: July 31, 1810; Copenhagen
- Died: 1856 (aged 45–46); Beaufort, North Carolina
- Burial place: Old Burying Ground (Beaufort, North Carolina)
- Relatives: Peter Frederik Wulff
- Military career
- Allegiance: Denmark
- Branch: Royal Danish Navy
- Rank: Captain

Captain Christian Wulff (31 July 1810 – 1856) was a Royal Danish Navy officer and friend of the writer Hans Christian Andersen.

== Early life ==
Christian Wulff was born on 31 July 1810 in Copenhagen, the son of Peter Frederik Wulff. He was the brother of Henriette Wulff.

== Career ==
Wulff joined the Royal Danish Navy as the family tradition prescribed. He became a second lieutenant in 1825 and a first lieutenant in 1835. He reached the rank of captain lieutenant and captain in 1851.

== Personal life ==
Like his parents and sister, Wulff was a close friend of the writer Hans Christian Andersen. They exchanged many letters and Andersen stayed in his apartment at Amaliegade 37 in Copenhagen from 27 June to 24 August 1848.

== Death ==
While stationed in Beaufort, North Carolina, Wulff contracted and died from yellow fever in 1856. He is buried in the Old Burying Ground (Beaufort, North Carolina). His headstone was sent from Denmark by his sister Henriette. She herself would perish while traveling across the sea to visit her brother's gravesite in the tragic wreck of the steamship SS Austria in 1858.
