= Peter Frederik Wulff =

Danish naval officer (1774–1842)

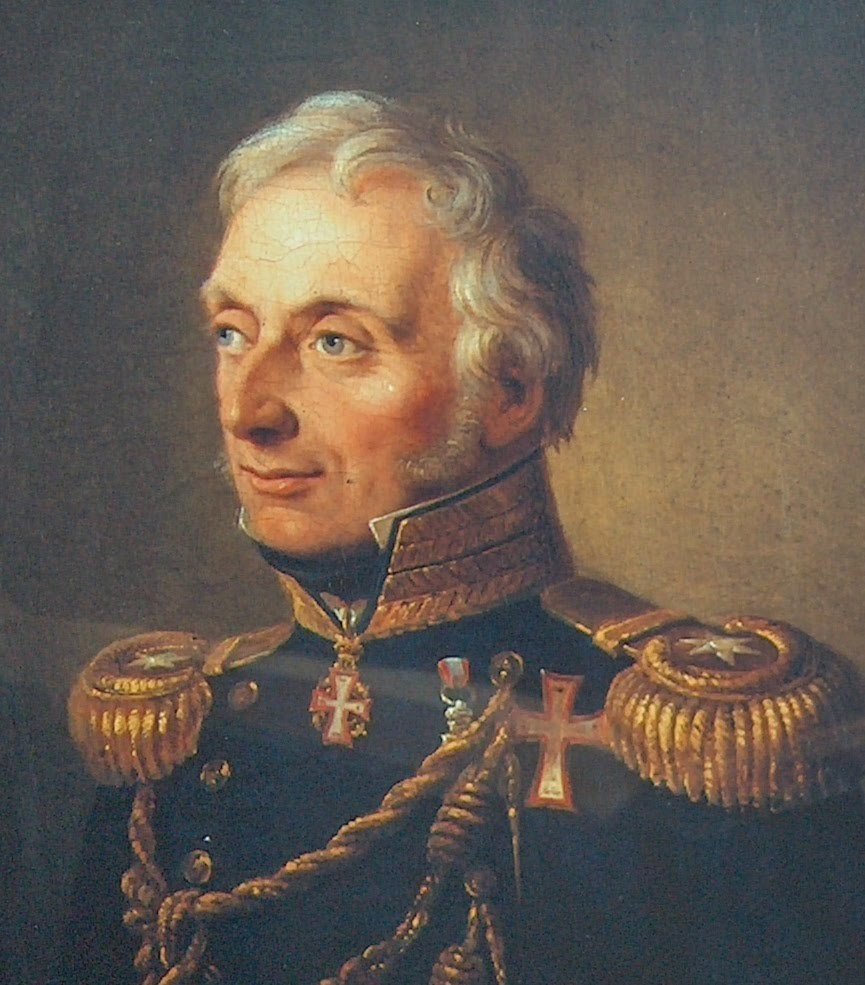
- Born: 26 November 1774; Copenhagen, Denmark
- Died: 2 February 1842 (aged 67); Copenhagen, Denmark
- Spouse: Henriette Wulff
- Military career
- Allegiance: Denmark
- Branch: Royal Danish Navy
- Service years: 1788-1841
- Rank: Counter-Admiral
- Awards: Knight of the Order of the Dannebrog

Counter-Admiral Peter Frederik Wulff (26 November 1774 – 2 February 1842) was a Danish naval officer. He headed the Royal Danish Naval Academy from 1824 to 1841. Wulff, his wife Henriette Wulf, and several of his children were loyal friends and supporters of the writer Hans Christian Andersen.

== Early life ==
Wulff was born on 26 November 1774 in Copenhagen, the son of first lieutenant and later commander Frederik Christian Wulff (1749–1812) and Kirstine Johansen (1755–1829). He was the elder brother of Christian Wulff.

== Career ==
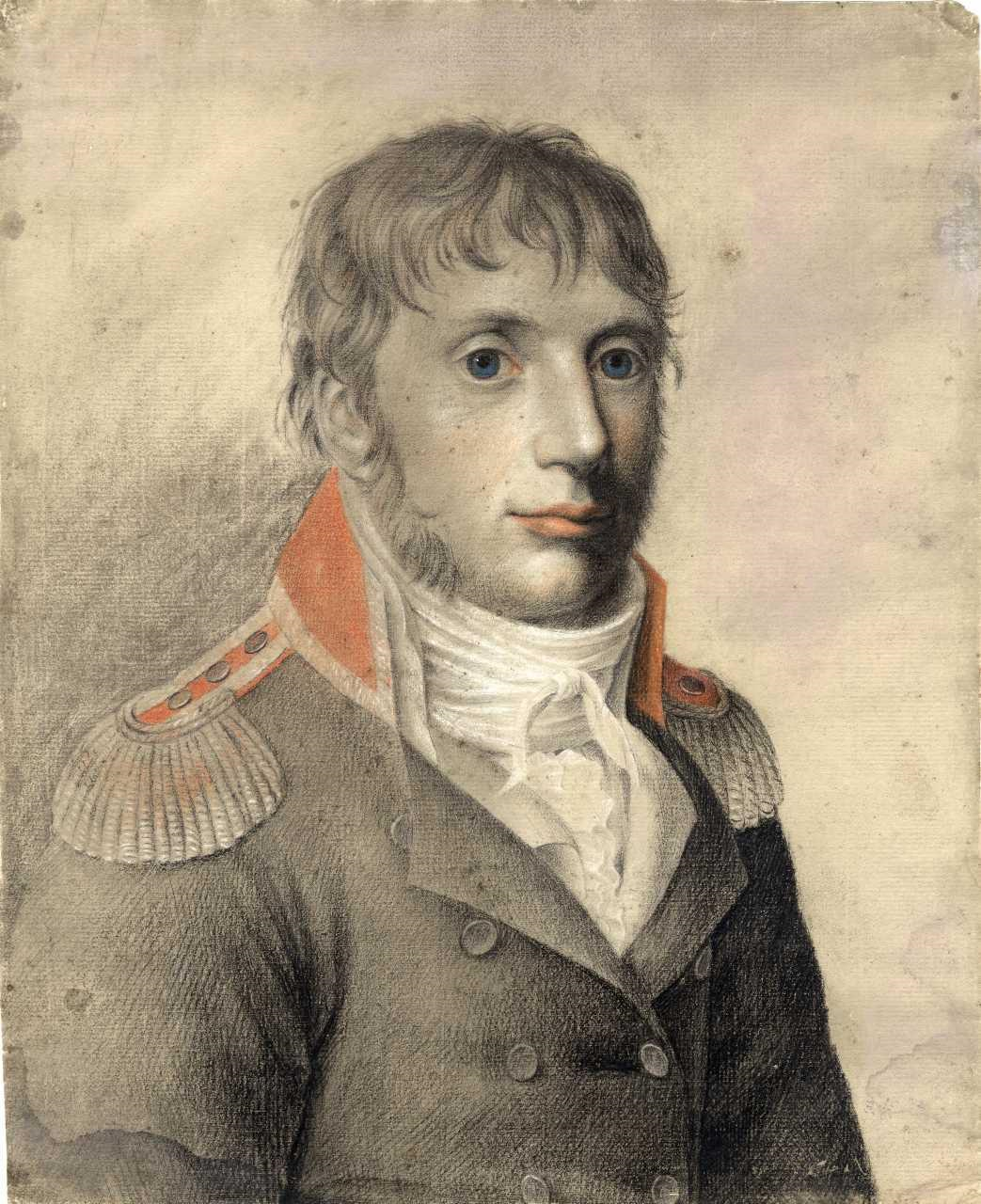
Peter Frederik Wulff as a 1st Lieutenant, pastel by unknown artist

Wulff enrolled as a voluntary cadet in 1780 and became a cadet in 1788. He was awarded Gerner's medal in 1793 and became a second lieutenant in 1794. In 1797–98, he visited the Danish West Indies on board the frigate Iris. In 1799 he became a first lieutenant. In 1799-1801, he served on the frigate Havfruen in the Mediterranean Sea. Back in Denmark, in 1802, he participated in cartographic surveys in the Little Belt and served on the ship Seieren in 1803. He was commander of the brig Fama in 1804. In 1806, he was appointed to second-in-command of the Naval Cadet Corps.

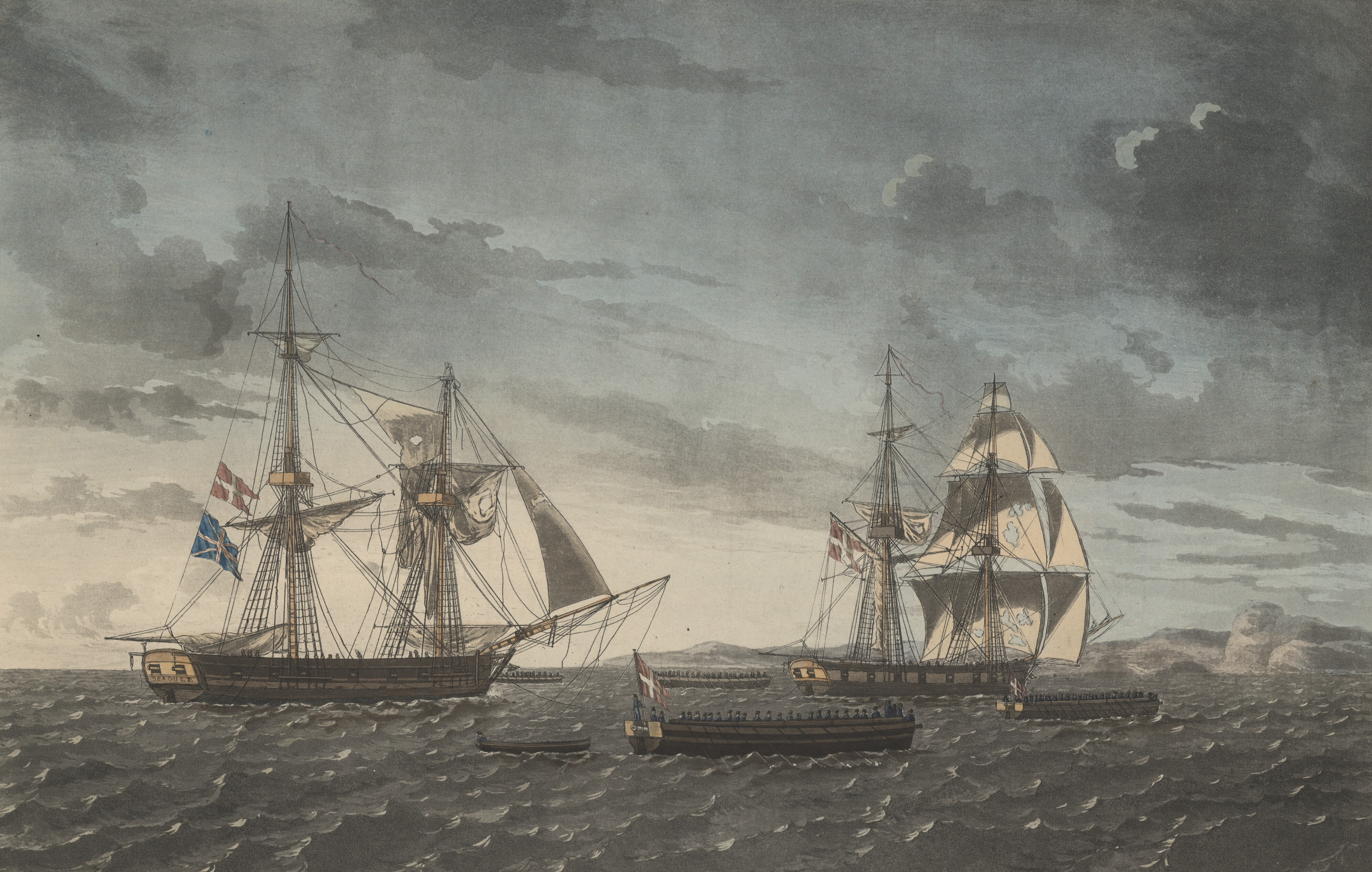
HDMS Lougen towing the captured HMS Seagull on 19 June 1808

In 1807, he served as commander of the brig Lougen at Norway where he fought an inconclusive engagement with the British brig HMS Childers and captured HMS Seagull. He was promoted to captain-lieutenant in 1808 and returned to his position at the Royal Cadet Academy ship in 1809. In 1810, he was commander of the naval training ships Tigress and Lolland. In 1811, he was commander of the gunboats at Funen, Langeland and Ærø. In 1812 his gunboats assisted a wrecked Russian frigate at Gedser. He reached the rank of captain in 1813. In 1813–19 and again in 1820–23, he served as commander of the naval training brigs Falster and Møn. In 1824, he was commander of the naval training frigate Freia, which transported Prince Christian Frederik (Christian VIII) to Bornholm, leading to a controversy with counter admiral H. C. Sneedorff who wanted to command the ship while the prince was aboard. Wulff replaced Sneedorff as head of the Royal Cadet Academy that same year. He reached the rank of kommandørkaptajn in 1825 and commander in 1834. He was appointed to generaladjudant and jagtkaptajn in 1839. He was promoted to counter admiral in 1840 and retired from the Royal Cadet Academy in 1841.

== Personal life ==
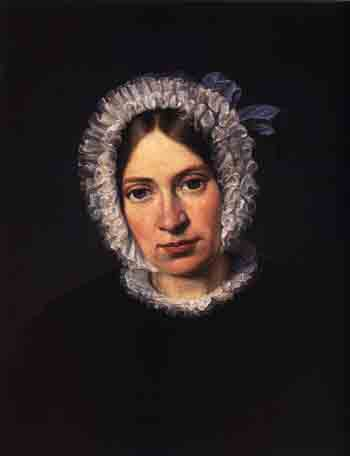
Henriette Eilff

Wulff married Henriette Weinholdt (12 October 1784 - 5 September 1836) in 1803. They had four children, two sons and two daughters. Their two sons, Jørgen Peter Frederik Wulff and Christian Wulff, both followed in their father's footsteps as naval officers. Their elder daughter, Henriette Wulff, drowned when the SS Austria sank in 1858. Their younger daughter, Ida Wulff, married the architect Jørgen Hansen Koch.

Wulff's home was frequented by several cultural figures of the Danish Golden Age. Wulff was introduced to a young Hans Christian Andersen and remained a loyal friend and supporter for the rest of his life.

Wulff completed P. Foersom's translation of William Shakespeare's plays and also translated Thomas Moore and G. C. Byron.

== See also ==
- HDMS Havfruen (1825)
