= HDMS Bellona (1830) =

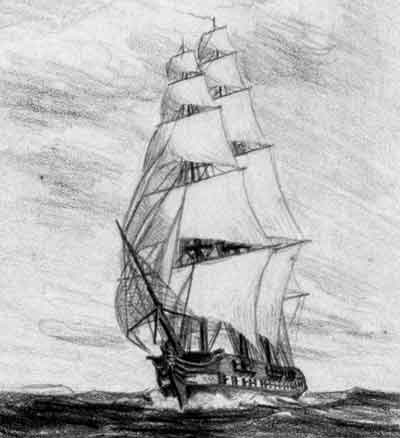
- HDMS Bellona

History

Denmark
- Name: Bellona
- Owner: Royal Danish Navy
- Builder: Danish Naval Shipyard, Nyholm, Copenhagen; Constructor Andreas Schifter
- Yard number: 23
- Laid down: 30 May 1826
- Launched: 15 September 1830
- Commissioned: 1 May 1835
- Decommissioned: 25 June 1862
- Fate: Broken up, 1868

General characteristics
- Class & type: Fourth rate frigate
- Tons burthen: 705 1/2 læster
- Length: 48.09 metres (157 ft 9 in)
- Beam: 11.84 metres (38 ft 10 in)
- Draught: 5.42 metres (17 ft 9 in)
- Propulsion: Sails
- Sail plan: Full-rigged ship, 2129 m^{2}
- Complement: 404
- Armament: 46 × 18-pounder cannon

HDMS Bellona was a frigate of the Royal Danish Navy, which she served from 1835 to 1862. On her maiden voyage to the Mediterranean Sea, she picked up some of Bertel Thorvaldsen's sculptures. Thorvaldsen lived 40 years in Rome. In 1840, she was sent on a partly diplomatic and partly scientific expedition to South America.

== Construction and design ==
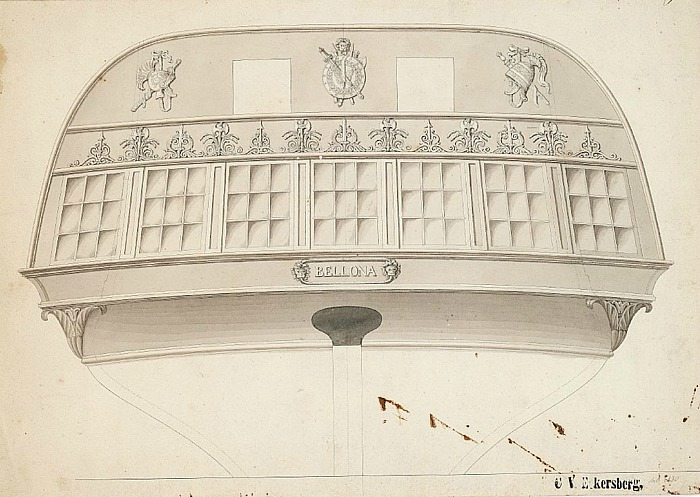
C. W. Eckersberg: Proposed transom design for HDMS Bellona, June 1830.

Bellona was built at Nyholm to a design by Andreas Schifter.She was one of four frigates in the same class. The others were HDMS Freya (1824-1853), HDMS Havfruen (1825) (1832-1864) and HDMS Rota (1825) (1822-1863)

Bellona was 48.09 metres (157 ft 9 in) long, with a beam of 11.84 metres (38 ft 10 in) and a draught of 5.42 metres (17 ft 9 in). She displaced 705 1/2 læster. Her complement was 404 men. She was equipped with 46 18 pound cannons.
A model of this ship, placed in 1840, can be seen in St. Jørgensbjerg Kirke in Roskilde

== Career ==
=== Mediterranean Sea ===
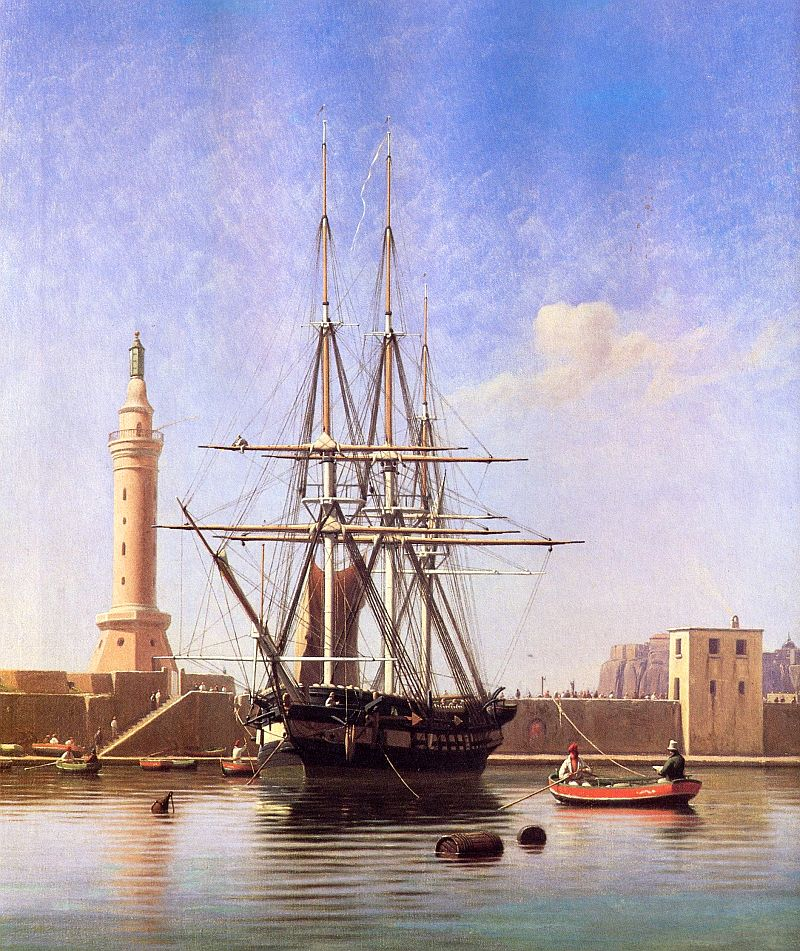
The Danish frigate Bellona at Naples in 1835.

HDMS Bellona was launched on 15 September 1830. Commissioned on 1 May 1835, she completed an expedition to the Mediterranean Sea from Copenhagen between 1 May and 5 September 1835. She was under the command of captain Louis de Coninck and brought back some of Bertel Thorvaldsen's works.

=== Voyage to South America ===
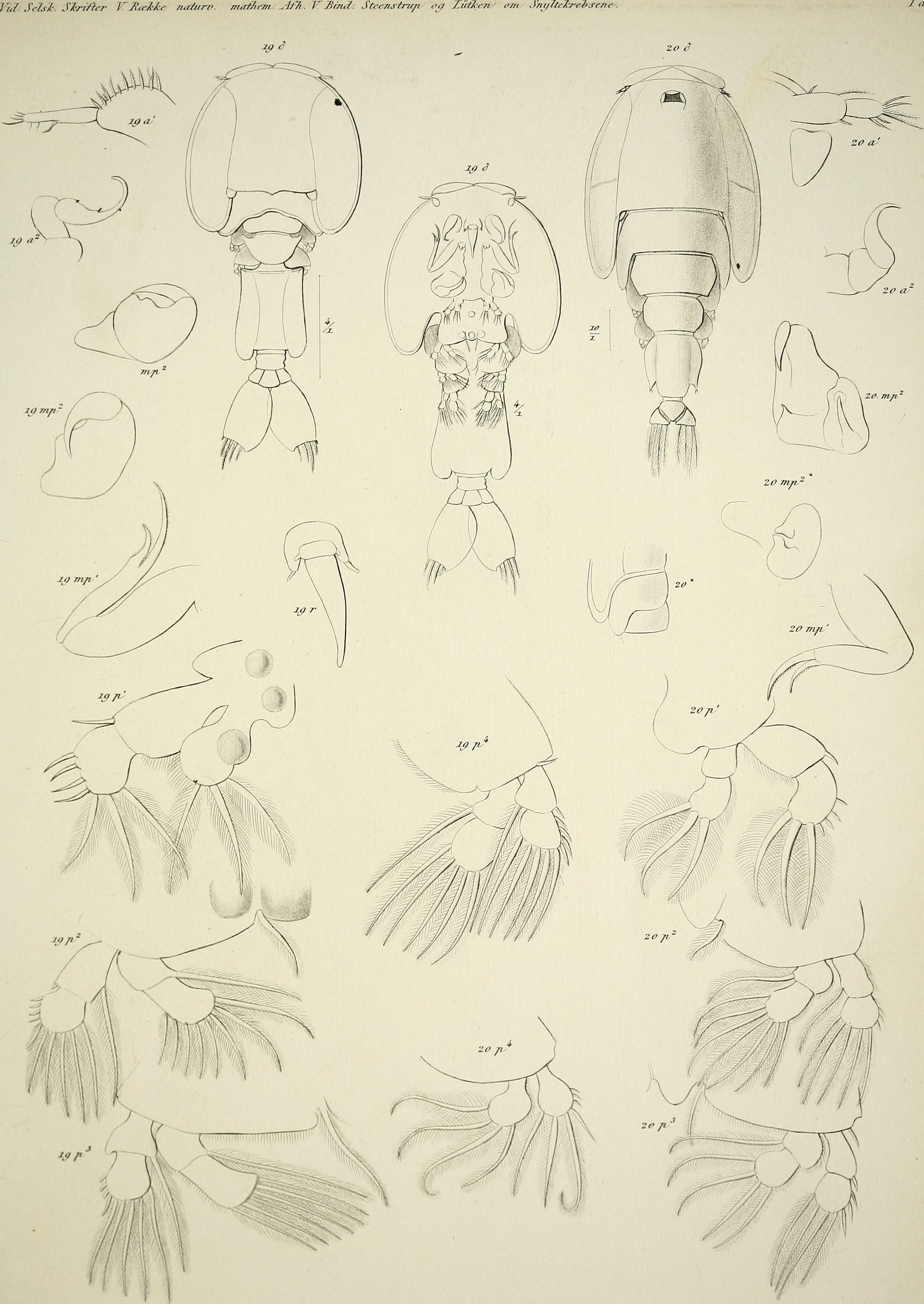
Plate with parasitic copepods from Krøyer's book from 1861

From 24 August 1840 to 21 August 1841, under command of captain Christian Wulff, she completed a voyage to South America. The primary purpose of this voyage was the establishment of trade agreements with the South American states, but also to establish contact to emigrated Danish citizens and in general fly the Danish flag in the new world. Scientific expeditions were also in fashion (not the least the recently completed voyage of HMS Beagle 1831-36 with Charles Darwin on board) and the Danish King Christian VIII had a keen interest for natural sciences. Thus on board Bellona was the 41 year old naturalist Henrik Nikolai Krøyer. Almost nothing is known from direct sources about Krøyer's work on Bellona, but indirectly from his later scientific publications it is evident that he collected a wealth of animals, in particular crustaceans.

=== First Schleswig War and later years ===
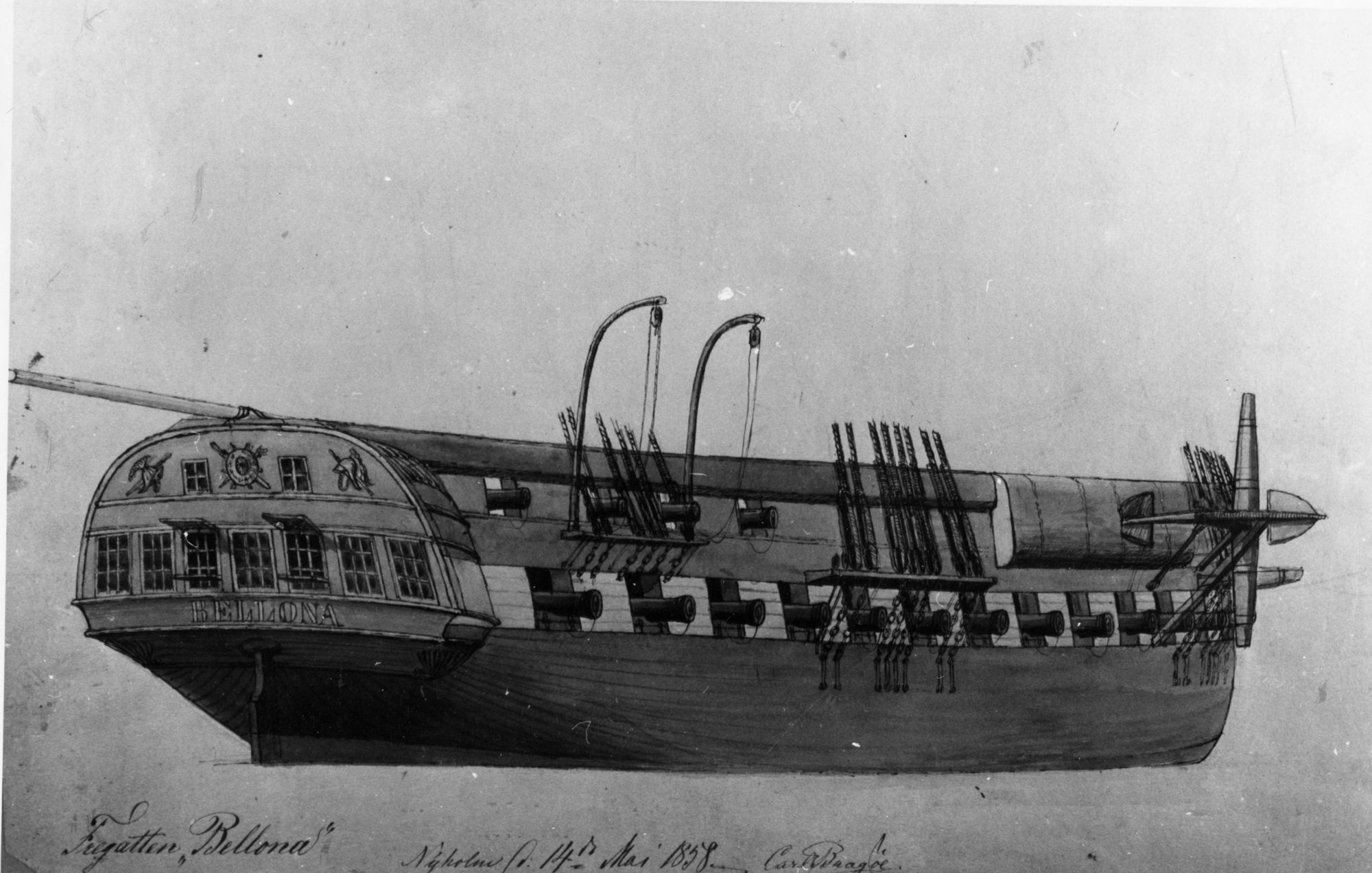
Bellona seen on a drawing by Carl Baagøe, 1858

In 1847, from 15 May to 18 August, she was commissioned to pick up a load of cereal products in St. Petersburg.

She was then equipped for service in the First Schleswig War. On 10 August 1849, she ran aground in the Elbe whilst blockading Hamburg. The blockade was due to be lifted the next day.

Bellona was in use as a naval training ship from 16 May to 25 September 1858. She was under command of captain R. F. E. Dirkinck-Holmfeld.

== Fate ==
She was decommissioned from the Navy on 25 June 1862. She was for a while used as a storage facility at Høruphav in 1864 before being broken up in 1868.

In his memoirs, published as Min Rejsegennem Livet, Andreas Drachamnn, who served as ship's physician onboard the ship, had provided an account of her voyage to Livorno.
