= Christian Wulff (1777–1843) =

Danish naval officer (1777–1843)

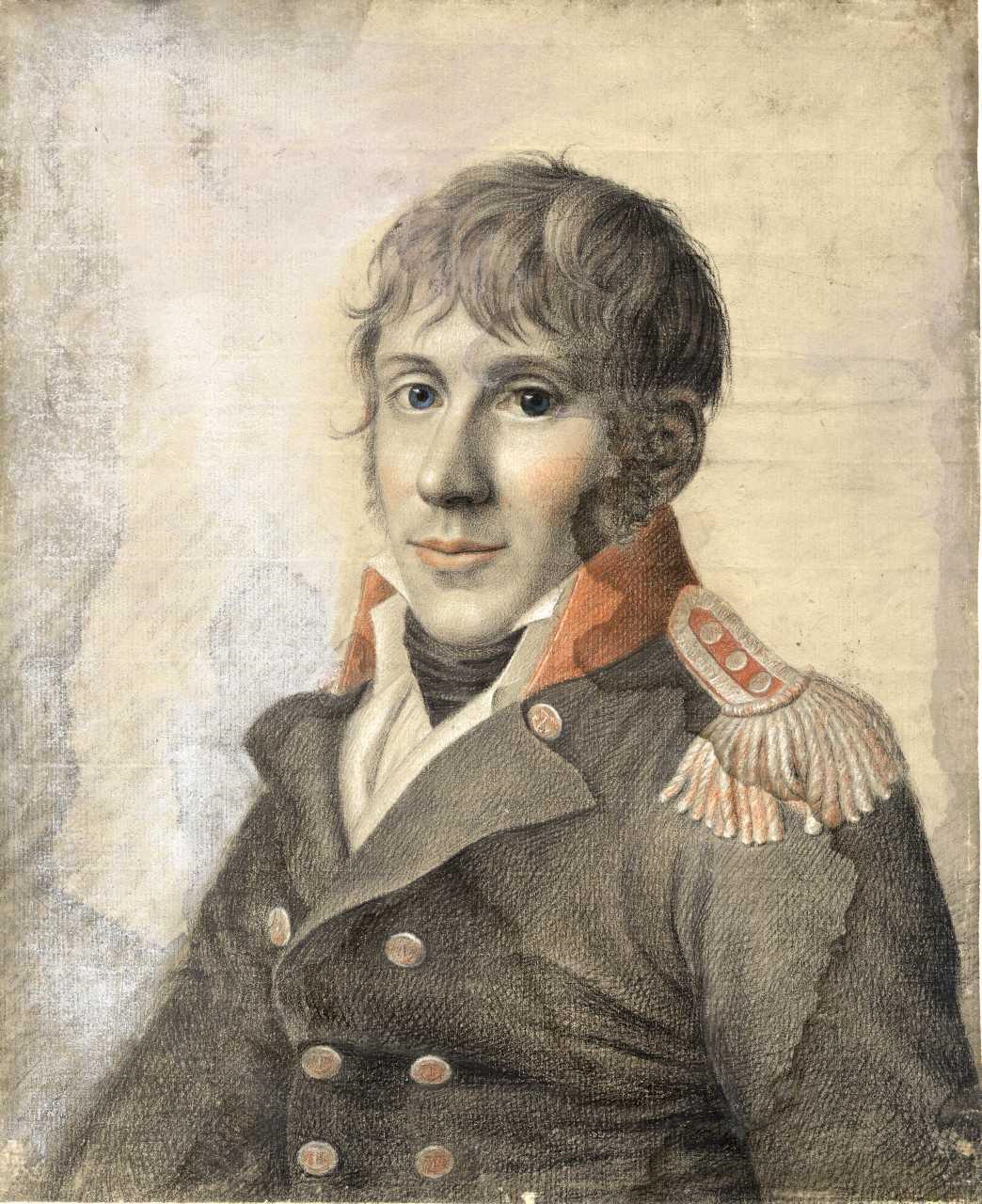
- Pastel by unknown artist
- Born: February 21, 1777; Copenhagen, Denmark
- Died: March 17, 1843 (aged 66); Copenhagen, Denmark
- Burial place: Cemetery of Holmen, Copenhagen
- Military career
- Allegiance: Denmark
- Branch: Royal Danish Navy
- Service years: Counter-Admiral

Counter-Admiral Christian Wulff (21 February 1777 – 17 March 1843) was a Danish naval officer. He commanded HDMS Bellona on her expedition to South America in 1840–41. He was the younger brother of Peter Frederik Wulff, who headed the Royal Danish Naval Academy from 1724 to 1841, and was the owner of Petersgaard at Vordingborg.

== Early life ==
Wulff was born on 21 February 1777 in Copenhagen, the son of first lieutenant and later commandant Frederik Christian Wulff (1749–1812) and Kirstine Wulff née Johansen (1755–1829). His maternal grandfather was Peter Johansen, a ship-owner, owner of Petersgaard and founder of the Petersværft shipyard.

== Career ==
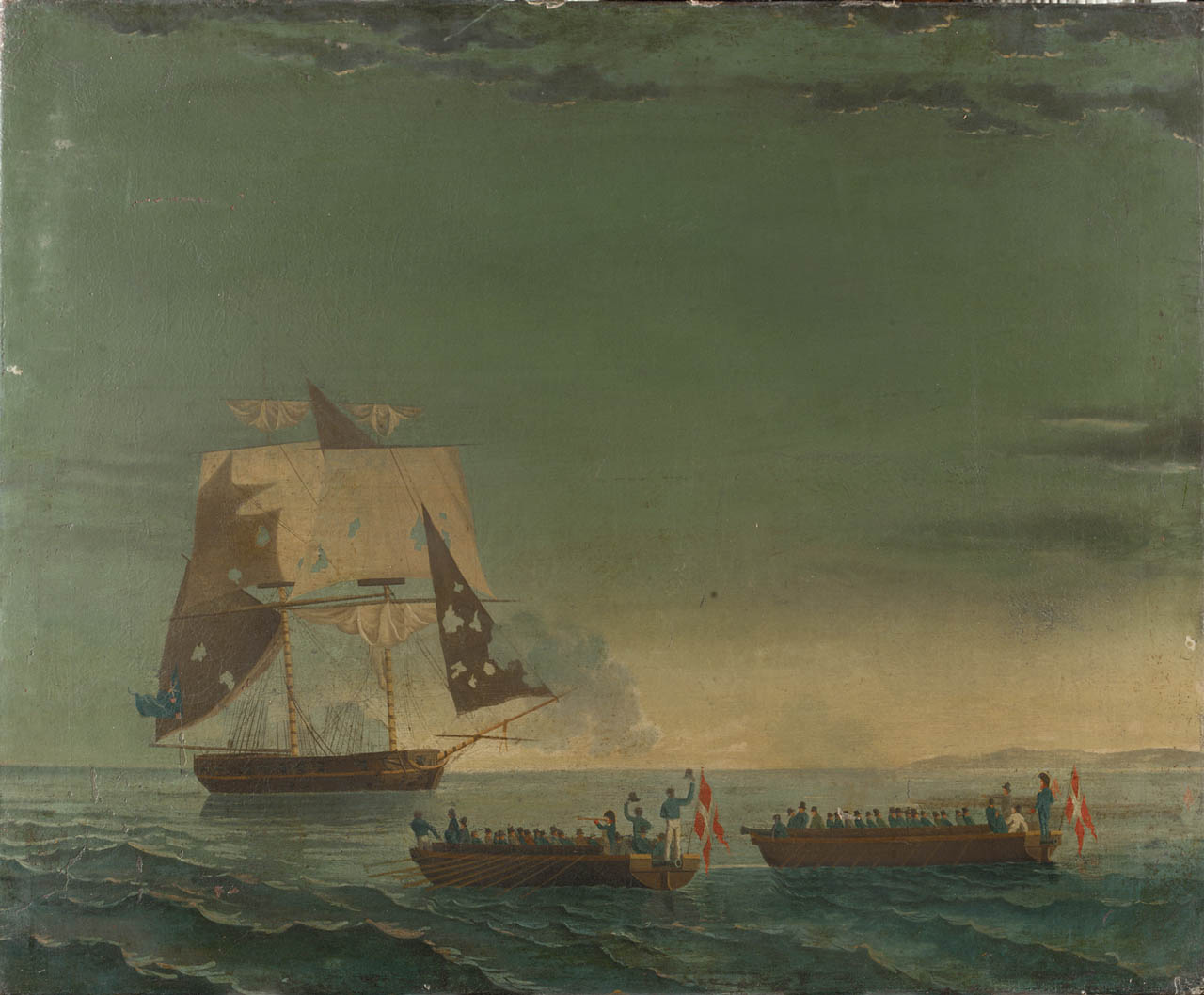
Wulff capturing HMS Tickler, 1808

Wulff enrolled as a voluntary cadet in 1781 and became a cadet in 1792. He reached the rank of second lieutenant in 1796. Over the following years he visited the Mediterranean Sea several times, first onboard HDMS Triton (1797–99) and, after a short spell in 1800 in home waters on the training ship HDMS Fridericksværn, on HDMS Seieren (1800–01 and 1802). He became a first lieutenant in 1802 and served as second-in-command on the brig FDMS Nidelven.

In 1804–13, he was stationed as enrollment officer in Nakskov. In 1806, he served on HDNS Prinds Christian Frederik. He commanded the boat Nakskov and acted as divisionschef in the Second Battle of Copenhagen, September – October 1807. In 1808–10, he was commander of the gun boats at Lolland. In 1808 he captured the Royal Navy brig HMS Tickler, whose captain, Lieutenant John Watson Skinner, was killed during the engagement. In 1809, his fleet of gun boats was in combat with the frigate HMS Melpomene at Omø. He attacked a large British convoy at Langeland in 1810.

He reached the rank of captain-lieutenant (kaptajnsløjtnant) in 1810 and was sent to France in 1811 where he initially served on the Scheldt. In 1811–12, he was second-in-command on the ship of the line Albanais. He was freed from service in France in 1812 and traveled to Aachen to recuperate.

Back in Denmark in 1814, he was once again commander of the gun boats at Tårs. He was promoted to captain in 1815.

In 1825–26, he was commander of the corvette Diana on an expedition to the Danish West Indies. He reached the rank of commanding captain in 1828 and commander in 1836.

In 1840–41, Wulff was commander of HDMS Bellona on her expedition to the east coast and west coast of South America. The Danish frigate collided with a French chasse-marée, La sainte Fleur, which sank in the English Channel. The French captain was later given full responsibility for the incident.

Wulff negotiated with the government in Buenos Aires, the President of the Republic of Chile, and the government of Peru on behalf of the Danish government.

On his return to Denmark in 1841, Wulff was appointed chamberlain and commander of the 1st division. In 1842, he was appointed generaladjudant and jagtkaptajn. He reached the rank of counter admiral in 1842.

== Personal life ==
Wulff married Henriette Bodille Birgitte Munthe af Morgenstierne (6 December 1782 – 16 March 1863) on 20 November 1803 in Aarhus. She was the daughter of landowner and later county governor (amtmand) and chamberlain Caspar Wilhelm von Munthe af Morgenstierne (1744–1811) and Anna Petra Cathrine Flindt (1750–1814). His wife bore him one daughter, Charlotte Louise Werner Wulff (1810–1842).

In 1810, he bought Petersgaard at Vordingborg (his maternal grandfather's former estate). In 835–36m he was a member of Roskilde stænderforsamling.

== Other sources ==
(in Danish) T. A. Topsøe-Jensen og Emil Marquard (1935) “Officerer i den dansk-norske Søetat 1660-1814 og den danske Søetat 1814-1932“. Two volumes.
