= Hellebækgård =

Hellebæk House
- Hellebækgård
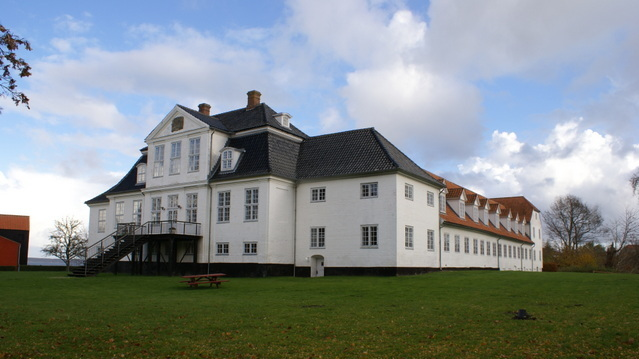
- The building viewed from the garden

General information
- Architectural style: Rococo
- Location: Hellebæk, Denmark
- Coordinates: 55°40′52″N 12°35′14″E
- Completed: 1747
- Client: Stephen Hansen

Design and construction
- Architect: Philip de Lange

Hellebækgård (English: Hellebæk House) is a Rococo-style mansion in Hellebæk, Helsingør Municipality, North Zealand, located 5 km northwest of Helsingør and some 40 km north of Copenhagen, Denmark. The estate is associated the former 18th-century Kronborg Rifle factory and has also housed the Royal Danish Orphanage. It now houses a private primary school.

== History ==
=== Early history ===
Hellebækgård was originally a tenant farm first mentioned in 1576 when it was called Teglstrup but it was later used by Christian IV and by the managing board of Hellebæk Ironworks. It was acquired by the manager of the weapons factory and became known as Hellebækgård in 1728.

=== Stephen Hansen's Hellebækgård ===
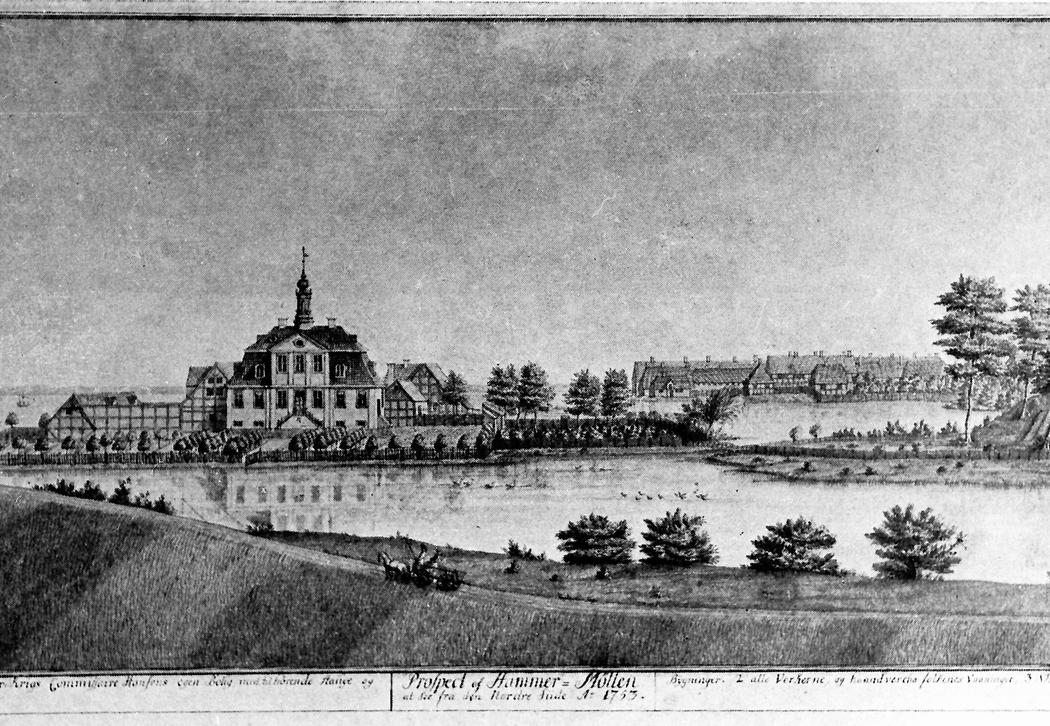
Stephen Hansen's Hellebækgård from 1747 as it appeared prior to the rebuilding in 1768

Stephen Hansen took over Hellebækgård and the industrial operations in 1743. He expanded the factory and improved operations, focusing on the manufacture of small arms under the name Kronborg Geværfabrik (Kronborg Rifle Factory). In 1747, he replaced the old house with a new main building. It is believed that it was built by Philip de Lange. In 1752 Hansen obtained a royal license to open an inn in Ålsgårde. After a while he moved it to Hellebækgård's east wing. Hansen sold Hellebækgård and the rifle factory to the crown in 1865.

=== The first Schimmelmann ===
Hellebækgård and the rifle factory, collectively known as Hellebækgård Manor (Danish: Hellebækgård Gods), was purchased by Heinrich Carl von Schimmelmann in 1768. He had been a financial adviser to the king since 1761 and was a member of Kommercekollegiet from 1767. He had bought Lindenborg Manor in Himmerland from the crown in 1762 and also the crown's sugar plantations in the Danish West Indies. Schimmelmann commissioned Philip de Lange to remodel the house. In 1770, Schimmelmann moved the inn to another building while a chapel was installed in the east wing in its place.

=== Ernst and Charlotte von Schimmelmann ===
Ernst Heinrich von Schimmelmann took over Hellebæk Manor upon his father's death in 1782. After his first visit to the place, Ernst Schimmelmann described the surroundings to his friend, the jurist August Henning, in a letter:

I return today from Elsinore, where I have spent two days inspecting the rifle factory, which is half a mile away on the far side of this town. You cannot possibly imagine a more charming place. The most diverse, the most romantic natural scenes are united there. It is on the shore of the sea, which is incessantly covered in ships; on the opposite side you see the cliffs of Sweden. If you seek a solitary or quiet spot, you just have to walk into the woods, which hides a wealth of lakes; are you tired of these, various streams will encourage you with their trickling. Hills with soft slopes, dark and quiet valleys – no, my dear friend, I do not know how I do this, but I am miserable at describing the most beautiful place on earth. Ignore my depiction and imagine a magnificent landscape. Enchanting in the summer and solemn in the winter. All this is only preparation, but my head, which is brimming with projects, has conceived an idea, simply that we – if you will come, my dear, very well could bid the world adieu for a month or more and throw ourselves in the arms of this solitude.

Schimmelmann and his wife Charlotte often gathered a circle of some of the leading writers and intellectuals of the time around them at Hellebækgård in the summertime. Among the guests were the romantic poets Friedrich Gottlieb Klopstock, Friedrich Leopold zu Stolberg-Stolberg, Jens Baggesen and Adam Oehlenschläger, the philosopher Henrik Steffens and the natural scientist Hans Christian Ørsted.

=== Det Schimmelmannske Fideicommis and World War II ===
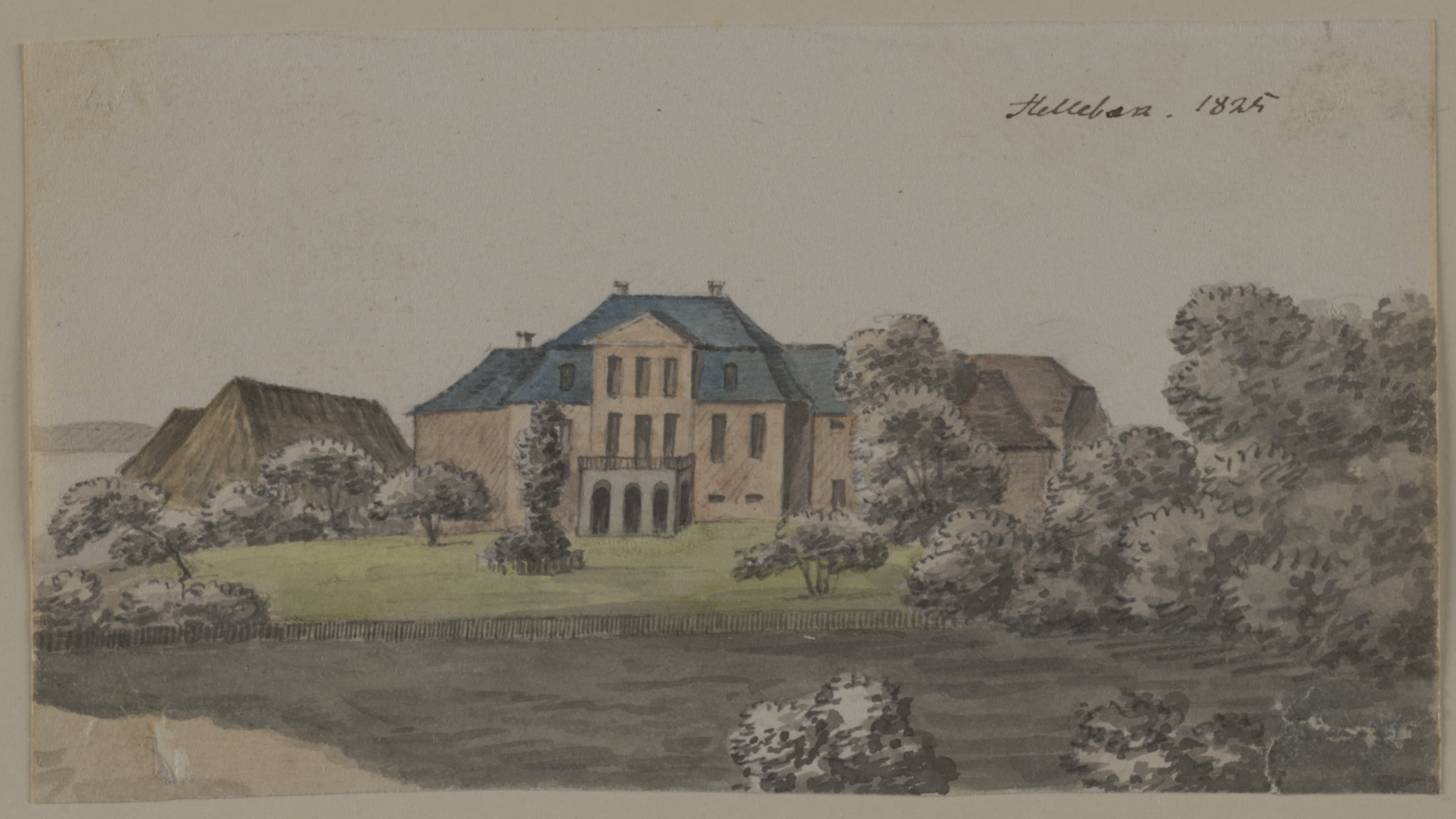
Ole Jørgen Rawert: Hellebæk, 1825

After Ernst Heinrich Schimmelmann's death in 1831, the estate was transferred to Det Schimmelmannske Fideicommis (literally "The Schimmelmann Fideicommiss"). The administrator resided in the Administrator's House at Trompeterbakken (Trompeteer Hill) in Bøssemagergade while the Schimmelmann family remained at Hellebækgård although they increasingly spent their time in Germany. The last Scimmelmann count to reside at Hellebækgård was Werner von Schimmelmann. At the onset of World War II, he entered German service and fell in 1941. The Schimmelmann family then made the house available to the German occupying forces. The Schalburg Corps used the buildings.

=== Later history ===
After the war, inn 1945, Hellebækgård was used for housing Bessarabian and Latvian refugees. The estate was after a trial confiscated by the Danish government in 1946. The main building had fallen into disrepair and was in 1951 sold to the Royal Danish Orphanage. The buildings were renovated and expanded at a price of approximately DKK 1.5 million under directions of the architect Aage Rafn and were inaugurated on 27 August 1953. The Royal Orphanage was dissolved in 2007. The buildings were then taken over by Copenhagen Municipality and used as a social institution until 2014.

== Today ==
The current school opened in 2014. The site includes a school building with five class rooms from 1962 and a building from 1982.
