= Odd Fellows Mansion, Copenhagen =

Building in Copenhagen, Denmark

Coordinates: 55°40′58″N 12°35′24″E

Odd Fellows Mansion
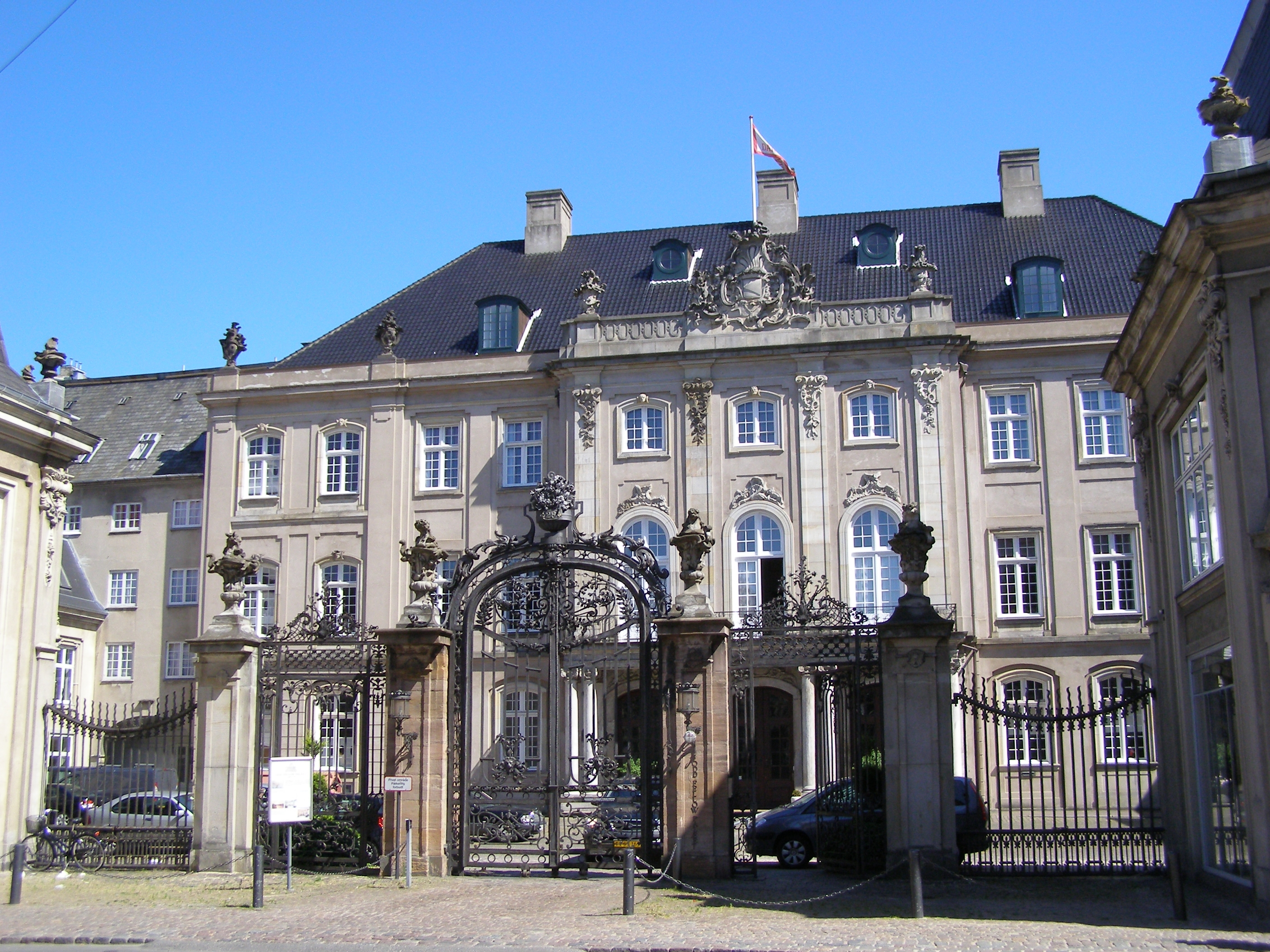
- The Odd Fellows Mansion seen from Dronningens Tværgade

General information
- Architectural style: Rococo
- Location: Frederiksstaden, Copenhagen, Denmark
- Construction started: 1751
- Completed: 1755
- Client: Christian August von Berckentin

Design and construction
- Architect: Johann Gottfried Rosenberg

The Odd Fellows Mansion (Danish: Odd Fellow Palæet) is a Rococo town mansion in Copenhagen, Denmark, named after the local branch of the Independent Order of Odd Fellows which acquired the building in 1900. Before that, it was known as the Berckentin and later the Schimmelmann Mansion after its successive owners.

The Building is located on Bredgade, opposite Dronningens Tværgade for which it serves as a point de vue. It houses a concert hall which is open to the public.

== History ==
=== The Berckentin era ===
The site was formerly located in the cast Sophie Amalienborg gardens. The present building on the site was constructed in conjunction with the development of the new Frederiksstaden district. It was designed by Johann Gottfried Rosenberg under the supervision of Nicolai Eigtved who had also conceived the district plan. It was built as a home for the wealthy merchant and politician Christian August von Berckentin who had just been ennobled with the title of count.

The property was listed in the new cadastre of 1756 as No. 71 SS in St. Ann's East Quarter. It was marked on Christian Gedde's 1757 cadastral map of St. Ann's East Quarter as No. 302.

After Berckentin's death in 1758, the Berckentin Mansion was taken over by his son-in-law, Christian Sigfred von Plessen, who also owned Glorup Manor on Funen, and had married von Berckentin's daughter Louise von Plessen née Berckentin in 1744.

=== Schimmelmann family ===
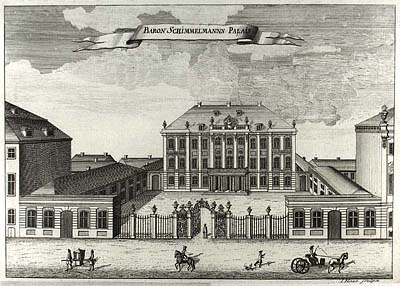
The Schimmelmann Mansion in the middle of the 18th century

In 1762, Heinrich von Schimmelmann bought the property which now became known as the Schimmelmann Mansion. After his son Ernst Schimmelmann inherited it in 1782, the Schimmelmann Mansion became the centre of a colourful cultural life. Ernst and his wife, Charlotte Schimmelmann, shared a deep interest in the arts and Charlotte was famous for her salons. In the summer, these pursuits were relocated to their summer residence at Sølyst north of the city.

Schimmelmann's property was listed in the new cadastre of 1806 as No. 171 in St. Ann's Quarter.

The property was after Ernst Schimmelmann's death in 1831 passed to his son Carl von Schimmelmann, It was after his death just two years later passed to his son Ernst Conrad Carl Joseph von Schimmelmann.

=== Later history ===
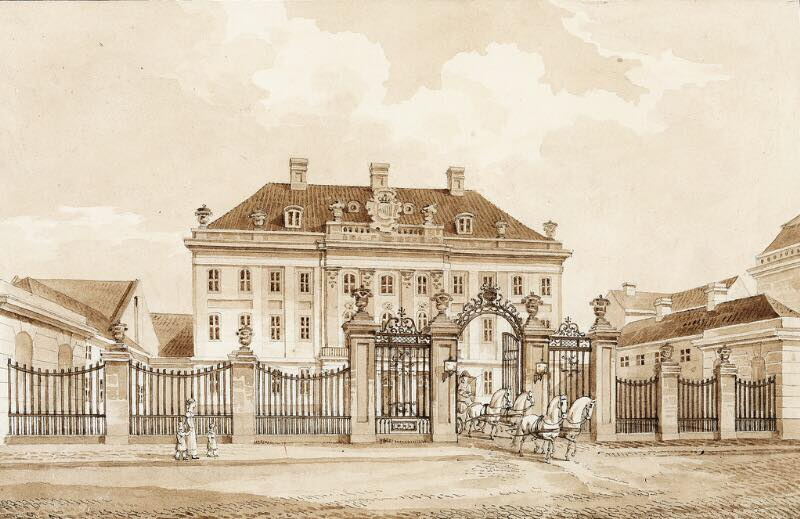
The mansion depicted by H.C.F. Holm.

In the nineteenth century, the mansion was occupied by various wealthy families, notably by Rudolph Puggaard who received there the artists of the Danish Golden Age.

The firm Bendixen & Lindhardt was based in the building in 1922.

== Cultural references ==
The building is used as a location in the 1997 film Smilla's Sense of Snow. It is also used as a location in an episode of the YV series Matador.

== See also ==
- Freemason's Hall, Copenhagen
- Thott Mansion
