= Sølyst, Klampenborg =

Building in Gentofte Municipality, Denmark

Sølyst
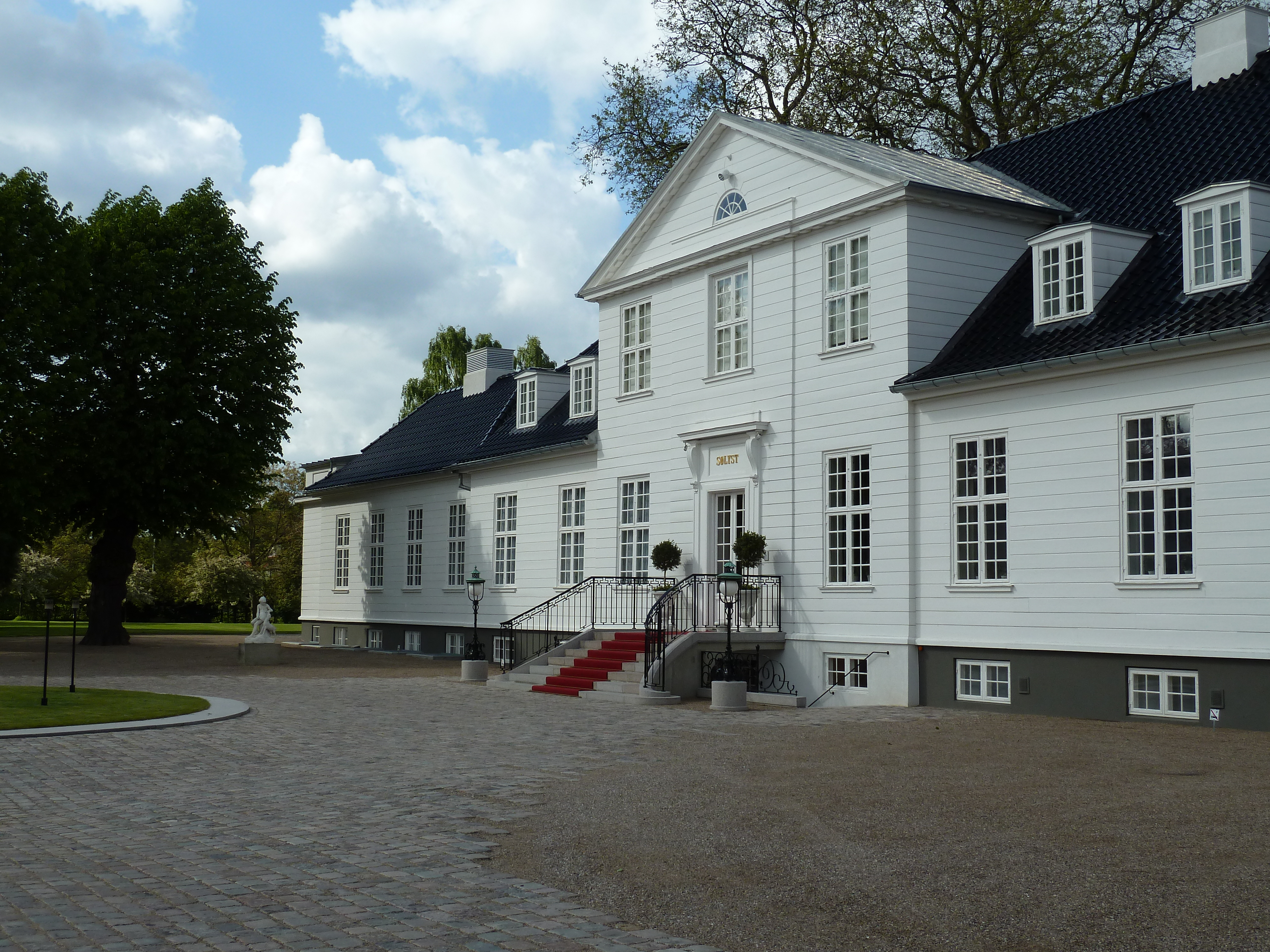
- Sølyst front view

General information
- Location: Klampenborg, Copenhagen, Denmark
- Coordinates: 55.7714°N 12.5927°E
- Completed: 1760
- Client: Just Fabritius
- Owner: Royal Copenhagen Shooting Society

Sølyst is a former country house located just near the Øresund coast in Klampenborg, Gentofte Municipality, on the northern edge of Copenhagen, Denmark. It now houses the Royal Copenhagen Shooting Society.

== History ==
=== First owners ===
The first Sølyst, then spelled Zeelust, was built by a merchant called Julius Frøichen. It was half-timbered and stood 11 bays long. In 1725, it was bought by another merchant, Just Fabritius, who also owned the nearby Rococo mansion Christiansholm, which he had built in 1746. He replaced the house with a new building in 1760.

=== A cultural venue ===
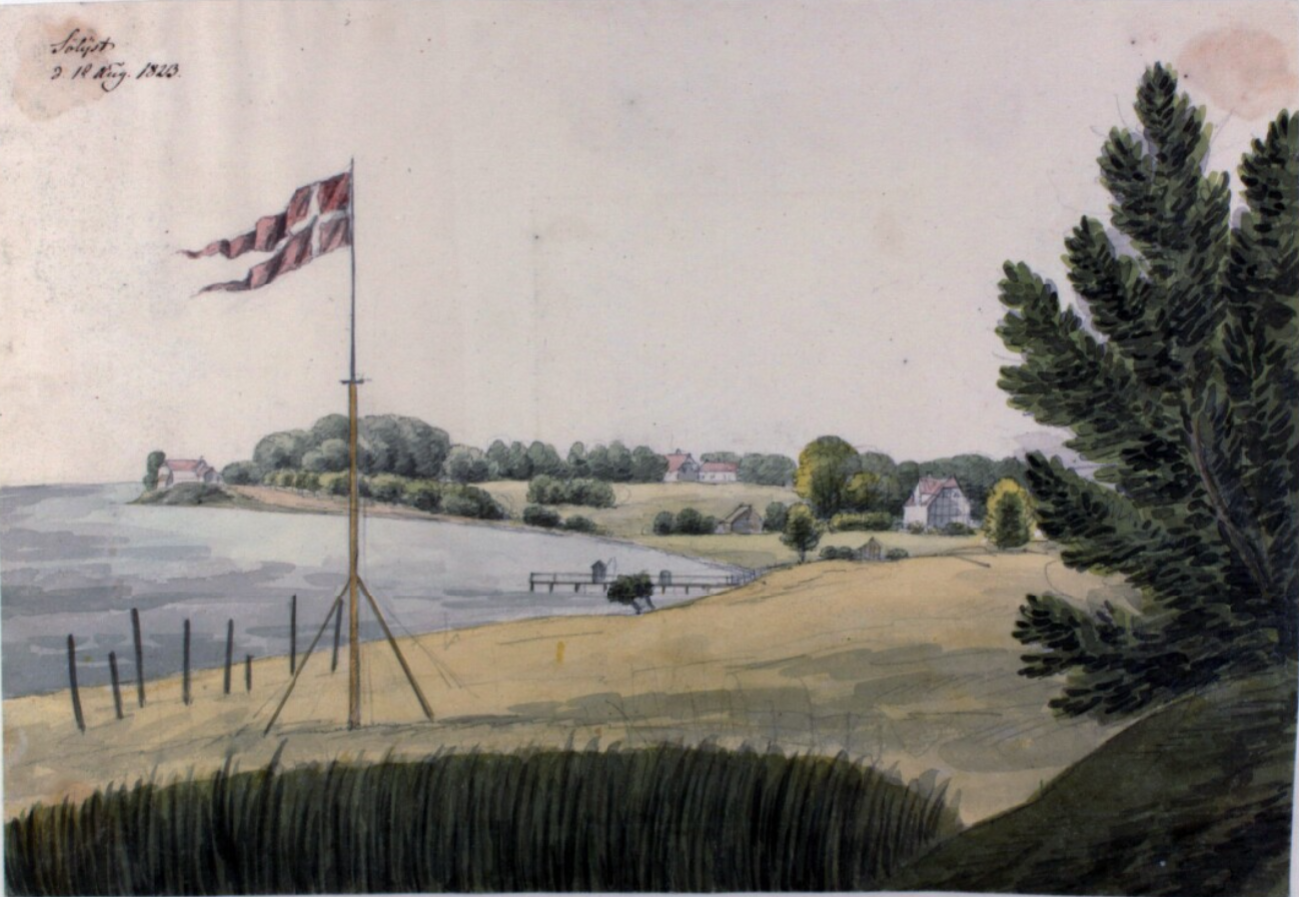
Ole Jørgen Rawert: Sølyst, 1 August 1823

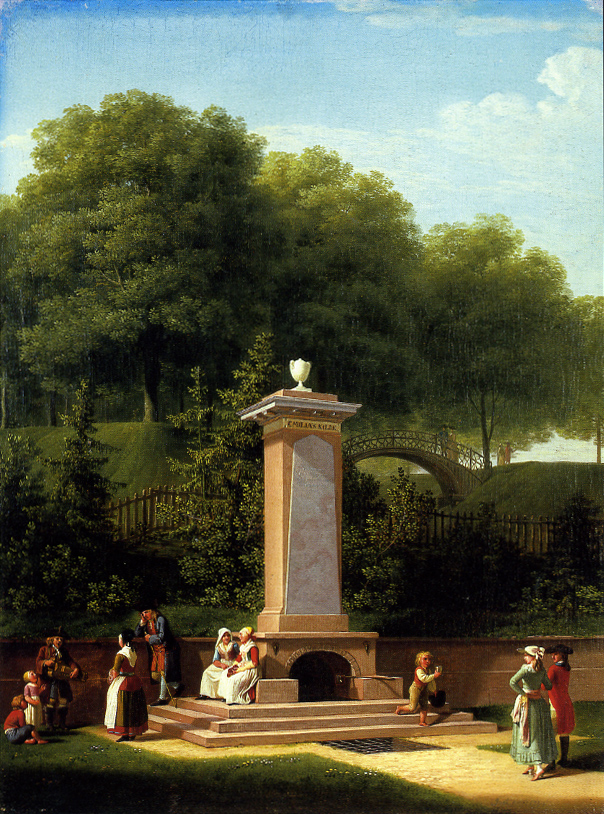
The Emiliekilde monument painted by Jens Juel, 1784

In 1776 the property was acquired by Ernst Heinrich von Schimmelmann, a central civil servant in the financial administration and later Minister of Financial Affairs, who used it as his summer residence. The year before he had married Countess Emilie Rantzau but she died of tuberculosis just five years later when only 28 years old. He remarried in 1782 and with his new wife Charlotte, continued to spend his summers at Sølyst. During the winter season they resided at the Schimmelmann Mansion which he had inherited from his father that same year. At Sølyst, to commemorate his first wife, he commissioned the artist Nikolaj Abraham Abildgaard to design a monument, Emiliekilde, by a small spring next to the main road where she had often rested on her walks in the surrounding countryside. Ernst and Charlotte Schimmelmann shared a passion for the arts and with them the house and park developed into a colourful cultural venue which gained an international reputation.

=== Changing owners ===
The Schimmlemann era ended when Ernst Schimmelmann died in 1831. Sølyst was inherited by his daughter Adelaide but she moved to Vienna in 1831 when her husband, Georg Heinrich von Løwenstern, received an appointment as Ambassador there, and in 1840 she sold the house. Over the next century Sølyst changed hands a number of times among land owners, businessmen and bank managers.

In 1949 Sølyst was acquired by the Royal Copenhagen Shooting Society. The society had been based outside Copenhagen's Western City Gate since the 1750s, at the site of the current Museum of Copenhagen and Shooting Range Garden, but after the city was allowed to develop beyond its former Bastioned Fortifications, which were decommissioned in the second half of the 19th century, the society had seen much of its land expropriated and soon found itself surrounded by the dense Vesterbro working-class neighbourhood. With Sølyst the society finally found a setting which was more compatible with its activities.

== Sølyst today ==
The Royal Copenhagen Shooting Society is still based at Sølyst but the property also serves as a venue for parties, receptions, meetings and minor conferences with attendances from 20 to 180 people.

== List of former owners ==
| From | To | Owner |
|---|---|---|
| 1724 | 1753 | J. Frøichen |
| 1753 | 1756 | Just Fabritius |
| 1771 | 1831 | Ernst Heinrich von Schimmelmann |
| 1831 | 1840 | Adelaide von Løwenstern |
| 1840 | 1858 | Theodor Suhr |
| 1858 | 1875 | Ole Berendt Suhr |
| 1875 | ? | Ida Marie Suhr, née Bech |
| 1913 | 1924 | Emil Glückstadt |
| 1924 | 1948 | G. Rasmussen |
| 1949 | | Royal Copenhagen Shooting Society |
