= Emiliekilde =

Monument in Denmark

Coordinates: 55.7724°N 12.5943°E

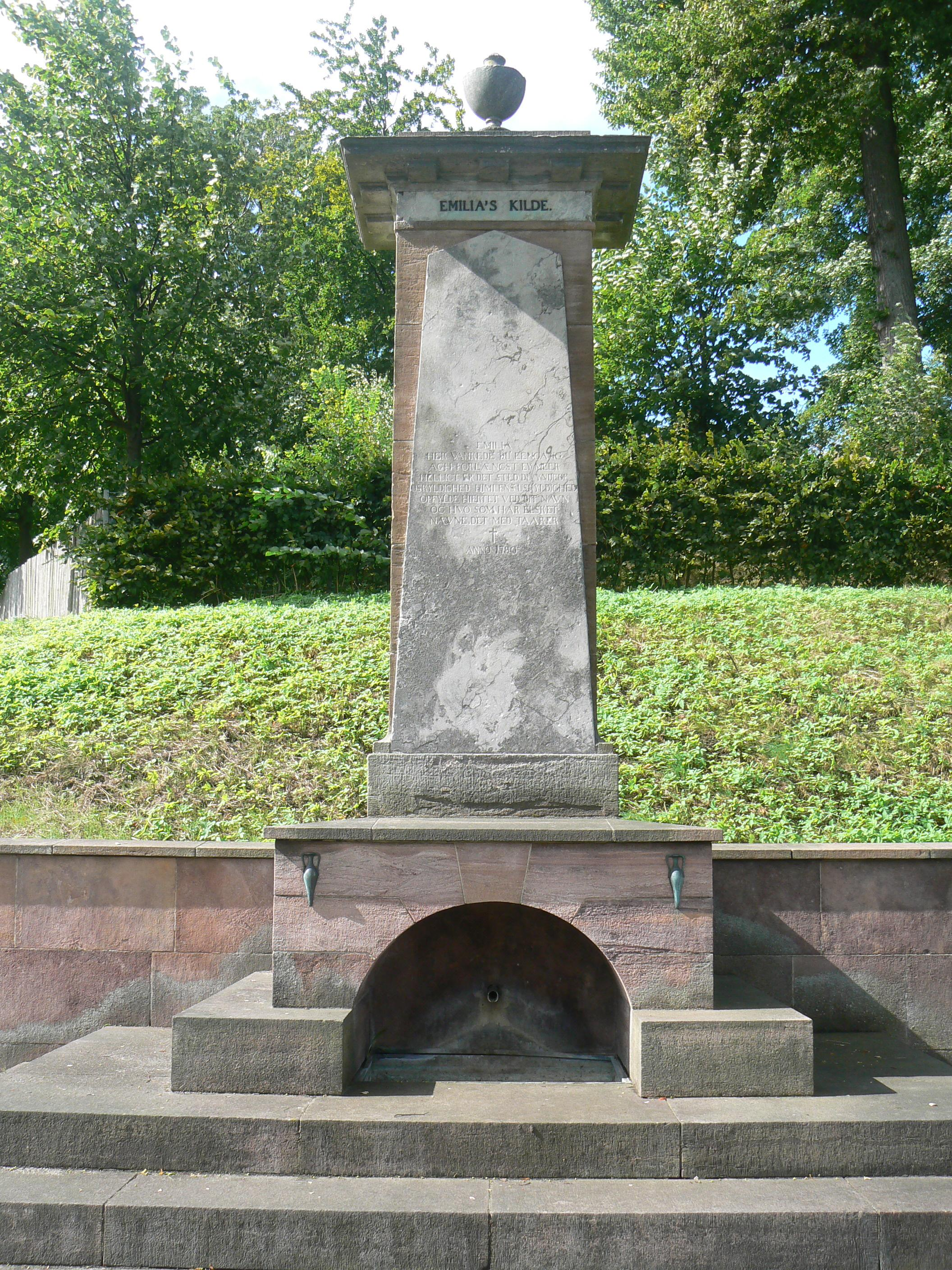
Emiliekilde

Emiliekilde is a memorial located at the corner of Strandvejen and Emiliekildevej in Klampenborg, Gentofte Municipality, in the northern suburbs of Copenhagen, Denmark. It was installed by Ernst Heinrich von Schimmelmann to commemorate his first wife, Emilie Caroline, who had recently died of tuberculosis.

== Description ==
The monument is 5.7 metres tall and built in reddish granite. A short flight of stairs leads up the monument, which is backed by a low wall. The wider base has an arched opening with a spring flowing from a small pipe. The monument is topped by a sandstone urn. Just below the urn is a white marble plaque with the name EMILIA'S KILDE ("Emily's Spring") in capital lettering. Further down on the monument is another white marble plaque with a short poem in carved lettering that has almost disappeared. It reads:

In Danish
Emilie. Her vankede du eengang
agh for længst ey meer
helligt er det sted dy yndede
uskyldighed himlens uskyldighed
opfyldte hiertet ved dit navn
og hvo som elsket
nævne det med taarer
Anno 1780

In English
Emilie. Thou once waited here
alas 'tis far too long ago
holy is the place thou loved
innocence, divine innocence
filled the heart at the mention of thy name
and he who loved thee
mentions it with tears
Anno 1780

== History ==
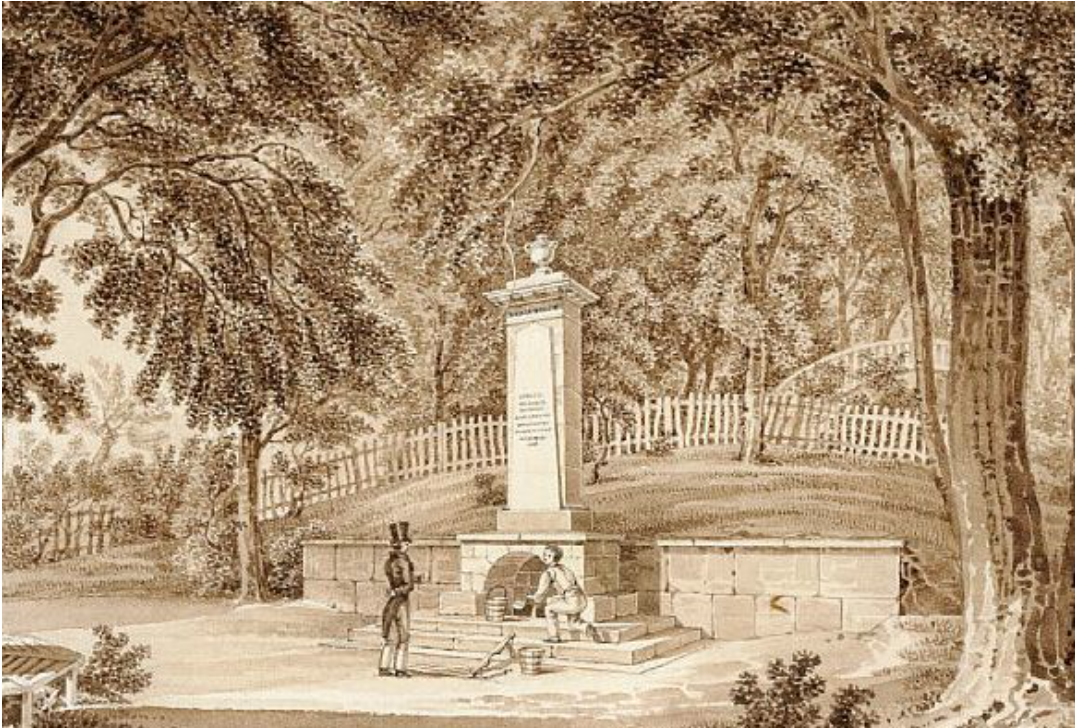
Emiliekilde

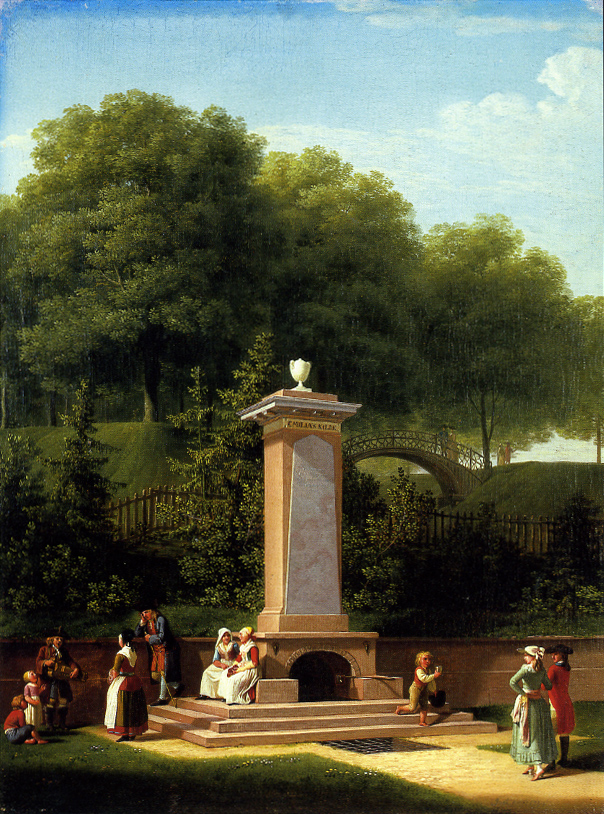
Emiliekilde painted by Jens Juel

Count Ernst Heinrich von Schimmelmann married Emilie Caroline Rantzau at Ahrensburg in 1775. The couple lived in the Schimmelmann Mansion on Bredgade in Copenhagen but spent their summers at Sølyst in the countryside to the north of the city. On 6 February 1780, just 20 years old, Emilie died from tuberculosis. Shortly thereafter Schimmelmann commissioned a memorial from Nicolai Abildgaard to commemorate his departed wife. He married Caroline Schimmelmann in 1782. The memorial to his first wife was installed close to Sølyst that same year. The poem on the monument was written by Christen Henriksen Pram.

The monument became a popular destination for excursions during the Danish Golden Age. It is the subject of a number of paintings from the period.
