= Ole Jørgen Rawert =

Danish writer (1786–1851)

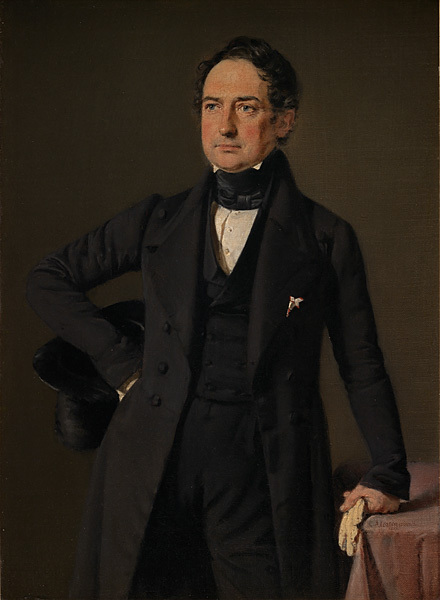
- Rawert painted by C. A. Jensen in 1839
- Born: 3 January 1786; Copenhagen, Denmark
- Died: 11 July 1851 (aged 64); Copenhagen, Denmark
- Occupations: Civil servant, industrial historian and illustrator

Ole Jørgen Rawert (Ravert) (3 January 1786 - 11 July 1851) was a Danish civil servant, industrial historian, topographical writer and illustrator. Throughout his life, he travelled extensively, in Denmark and the rest of Europe, documenting what his saw through a vast number of rather primitive, dated topographical watercolors.

== Early life and career ==
Rawert was born in Copenhagen, the son of Jørgen Heinrich Rawert (1751–1823) and Anna Maria Krieger (1758–1826). He passed grammar school in 1803 and then enrolled at the University of Copenhagen, but the nature of his studies is unknown. In 1809 he was employed as a copyist in the Kommercekollegiet. He became an associated member of the board of directors of the royal manufactories (overtalligt medlem af fabrikdirektionen), and a co-editor of Handels- og Industritidende ("Journal of Trade and Industry"), and, in 1812, a full board member.

== Travels and publications ==
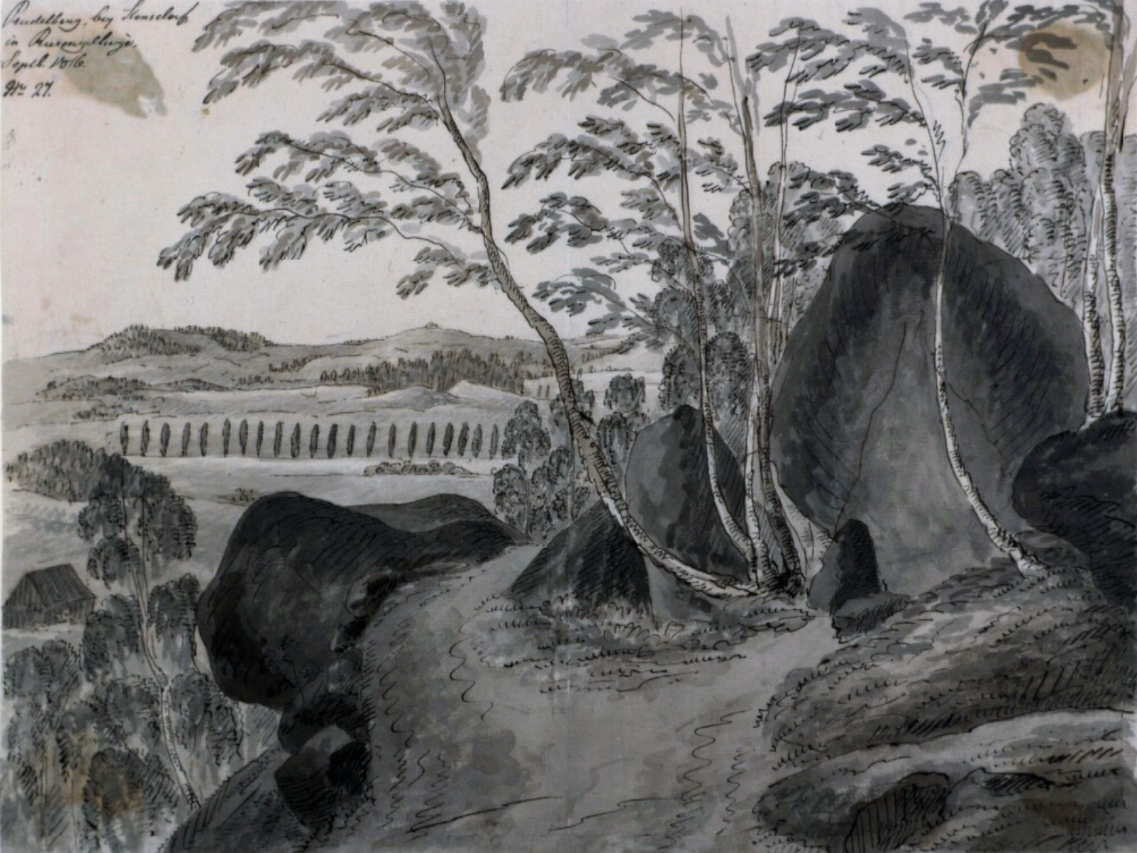
Prudelberg bey Stonsdorf in Riesengebürge, 1816

The state bankruptcy of 1813 left the country in a difficult situation. The position of editor of Handels- og Industritidende was suspended temporarily in 1814 and the board of management of the royal manufactories was dissolved in 1816, leaving Rawert out of work and with only a small pension (ventepenge). Rawert had visited Bornholm with Gottfried Garlieb in 1815 (their description of the island was published in 1818) and now received a royal stipend to study industrial enterprises on a journey abroad in 1816–19. He visited Germany, Switzerland, Italy, France, England, and The Netherlands. A visit to Ireland in October 1818 produced five pictures from the area of Dublin and Wicklow in manuscript form (Rawerts maleriske Reisebut, VI) but were not accompanied by a travel narrative. He then travelled widely in Denmark in 1819–21, publishing the Danske Egne ("Regions of Denmark") in 1819–23, The work was richly illustrated with copper print engraving by Søren Henrik Petersen (1788-1860) based on his own and Rawert's drawings. His next work, Beretning om Industriens Tilstand i de danske Provindser ("An account of the Condition of Industrial Enterprises in the Provinces"), published in 1820, received considerable attention. It described the sorry condition of industrial enterprises around the country and argued that the situation could only be improved through the establishment of polytechnic schools and other educational facilities.

== Later career ==
Rawert was appointed as accessor in 1823 and once again served as editor of Handels- og Industritidende from 1825–44. In 1829, he once again became a member (ekstrakommitteret) of kommercekollegiet. He left it in 1831 to assume a position as customs inspector in Copenhagen as well as director of factories.

== New travels and publications, 1844–49 ==
Reaert retired as customs inspector and editor of Handels- og Industritidende in 1844 but remained director of factories until his death. In 1844 and 1845 he travelled in Germany and Austria with economic support from Industrifonden and Den Reiersenske Fond. It resulted in small publications about the industry of Sachsen, Württemberg, Bavaria, Hannover and Austria in 1846–47. A similar publication about Sweden was published in 1847. He published Kongeriget Danmarks industrielle Forhold fra de ældste Tider indtil Begyndelsen af 1848 in 1848.

== Personal life ==
Rawert married Cathrine Actonia Christine Bugge (21 March 1786 - 1 April 1849) on 29 November 1827. She was a daughter of State Council secretary (gehejmekabinetssekretær) Frederik Conrad Bugge (1754–1842) and Henriette Cathrine Henrichsen (1746–1830). After his first wife's death in 1849, Rawert married her younger sister, Henriette Cathrine Bugge (8 August 1801 - 25 April 1885), on 27 November 1849.

== Legacy ==
The Royal Danish Library contains approximately 1,400 coloured drawings from his travels. Rawert was not only interested in strengthening industrial development but also in the industrial history of the country. This resulted in numerous articles in Handels- og Industritidende. He began the publication of a work on the history of the textile industry in Denmark in 1813 but discontinued it for "several reasons" that he fails to specify. An article in Handels- og Industrietidende from 1825 about the state of trade in Denmark resulted in an official note of displeasure. Kongeriget Danmarks industrielle Forhold fra de ældste Tider indtil Begyndelsen af 1848 (1848) is considered his most significant work. It is, however, rather a compilation of his earlier articles and publications than a coherent work which provides a clear overview of the subject. The kommercekollegiet archives provided him with much valuable information.

Rawert's Almindeligt Varelexicon published in two volumes in 1831 and 1834 provides detailed information on everyday goods, their place of origin, and history, etc.

== Gallery ==
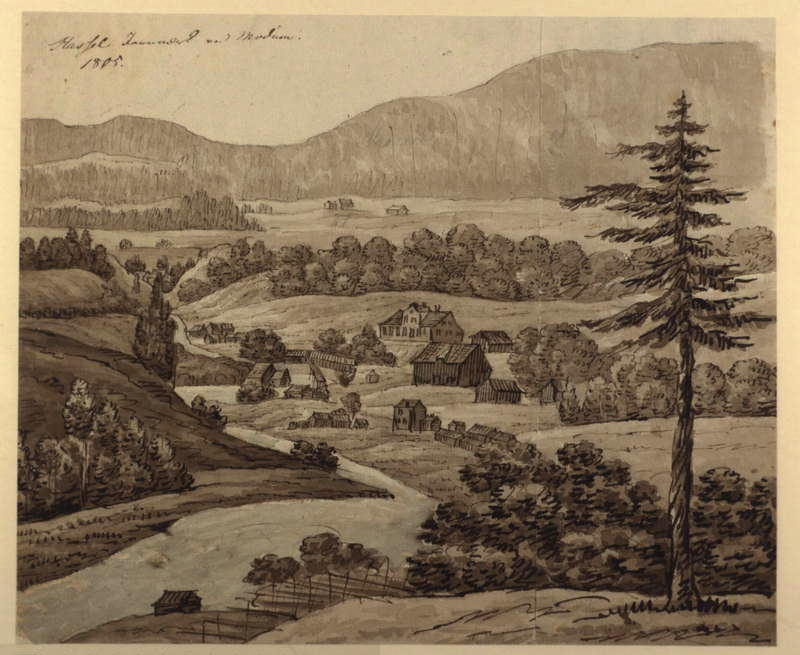
1805: Hassel Iron Works, Norway

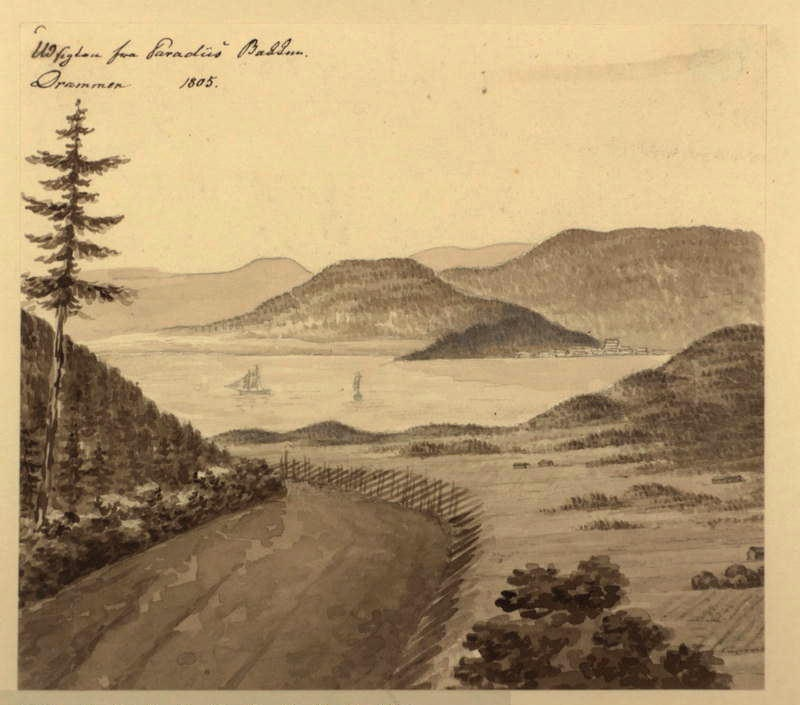
1805: View From Paradise Hill, Drammen, Norway

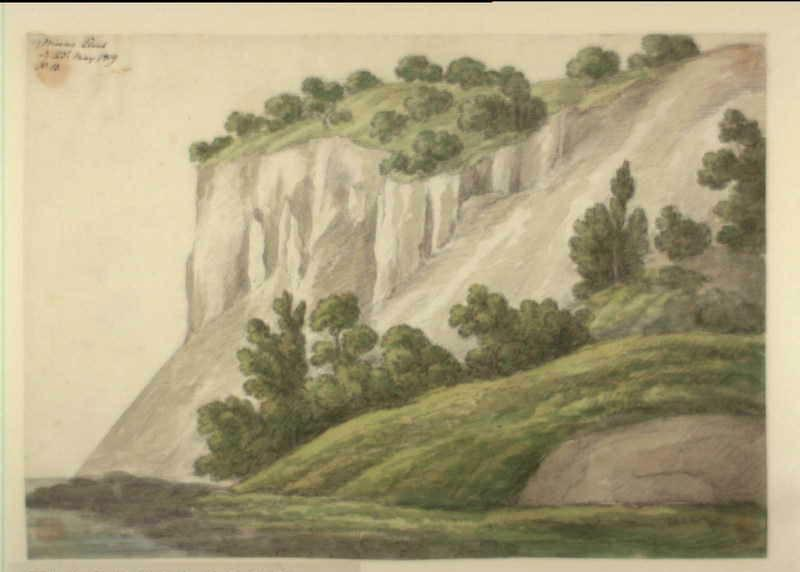
23 May 1819: Møns Klint, Møn

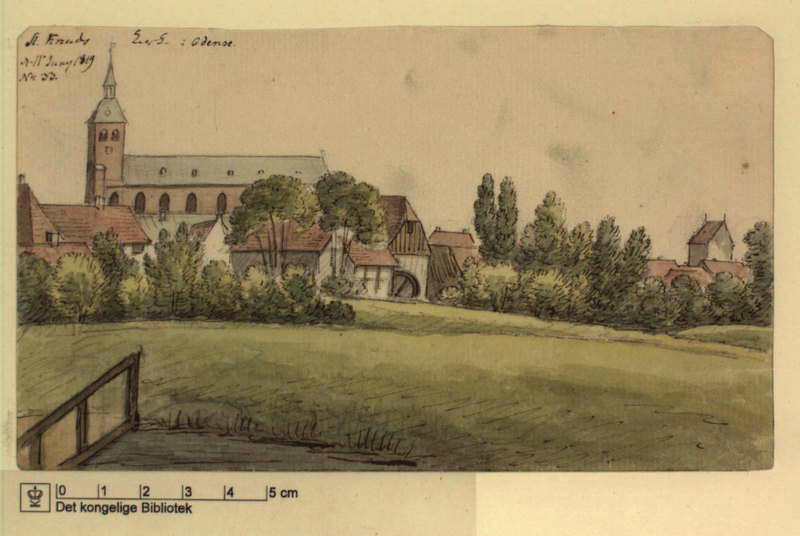
11 June 1819: St. Canute's Cathedral, Odense

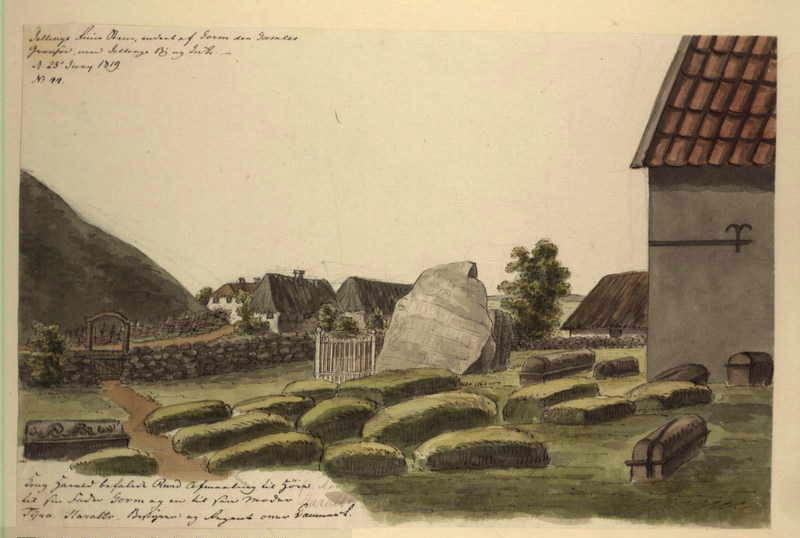
25 June 1819: Jelling stones

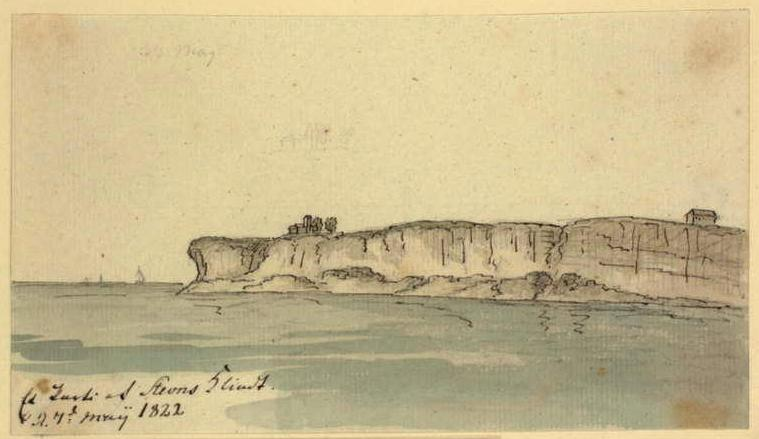
7 May 1822: Stevns Klint

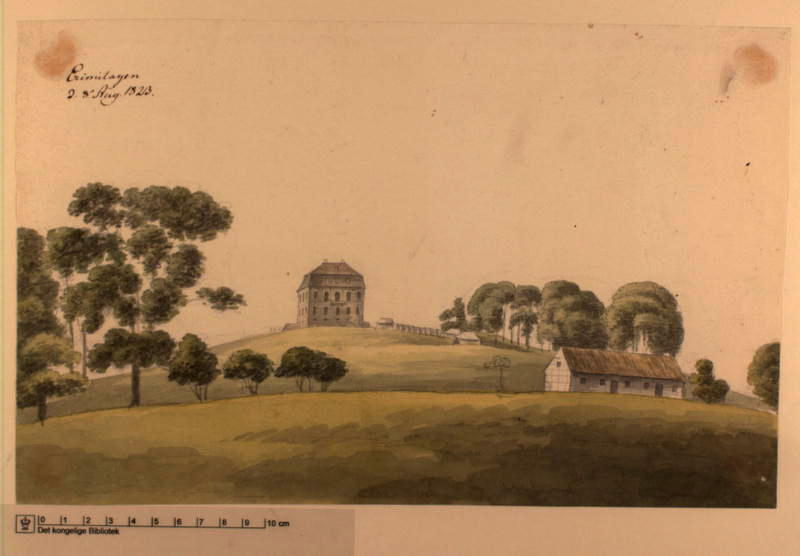
8 August 1823; The Hermitage, Jægersborg Deer Park

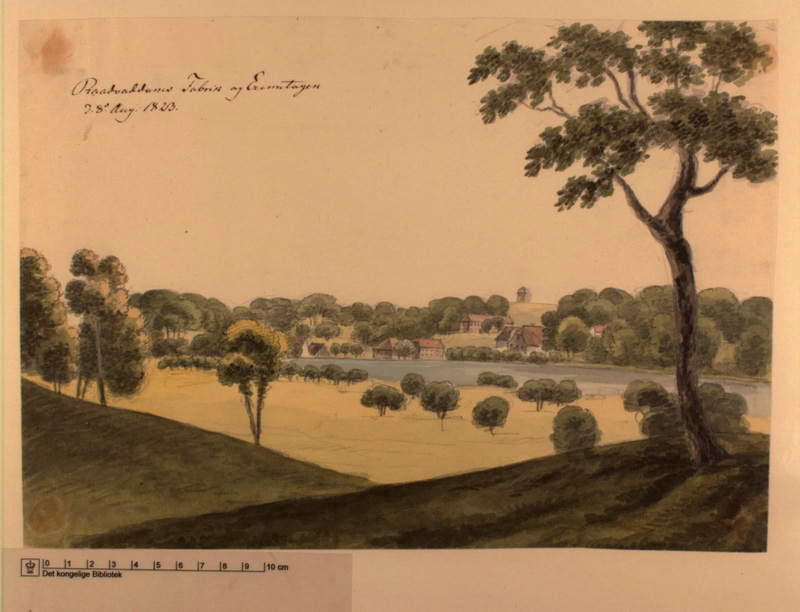
8 August 1823: Raadvad

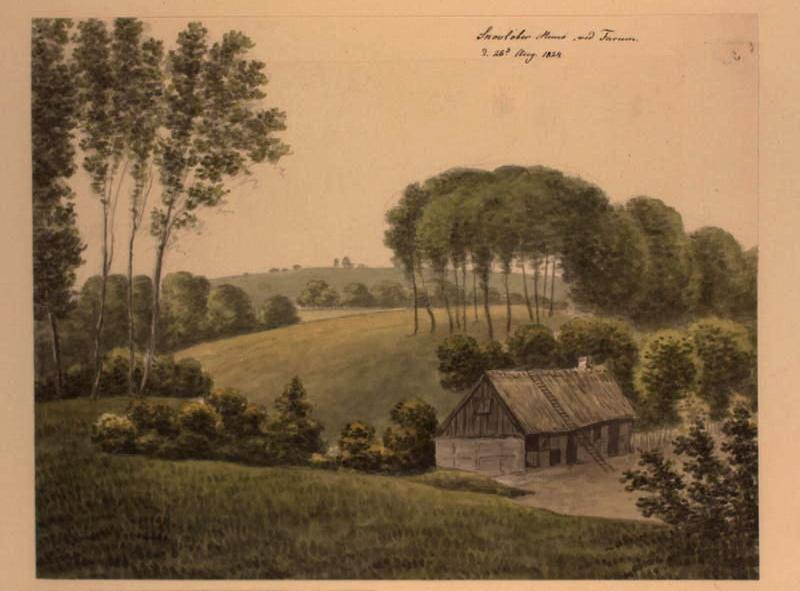
26 August 1824; Forest Worker's House at Farum

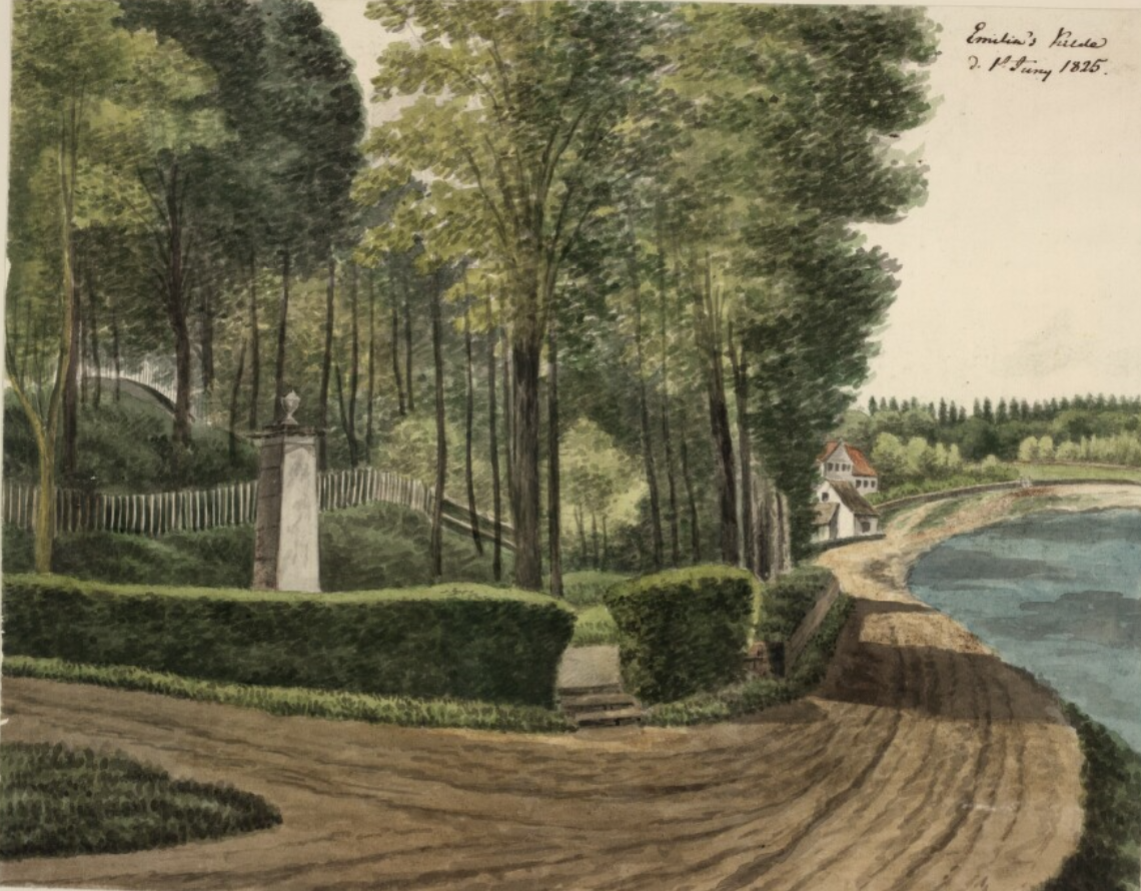
1 June 1825: Emilie's Spring, Charlottenlund

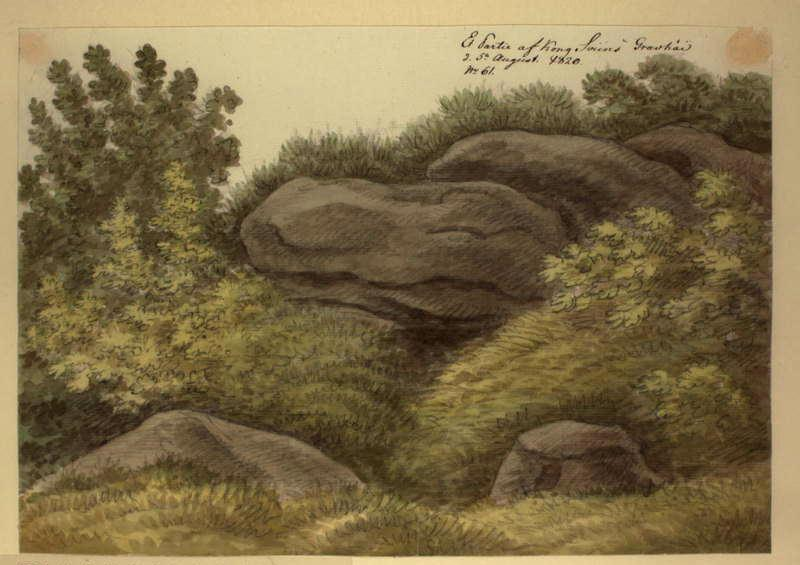
5 August 1820 King Svin's Mound, Smørum

== See also ==
- Christian Albert Clemmensen
