= Caroline von Schimmelmann =

Danish countess (1730–1795)

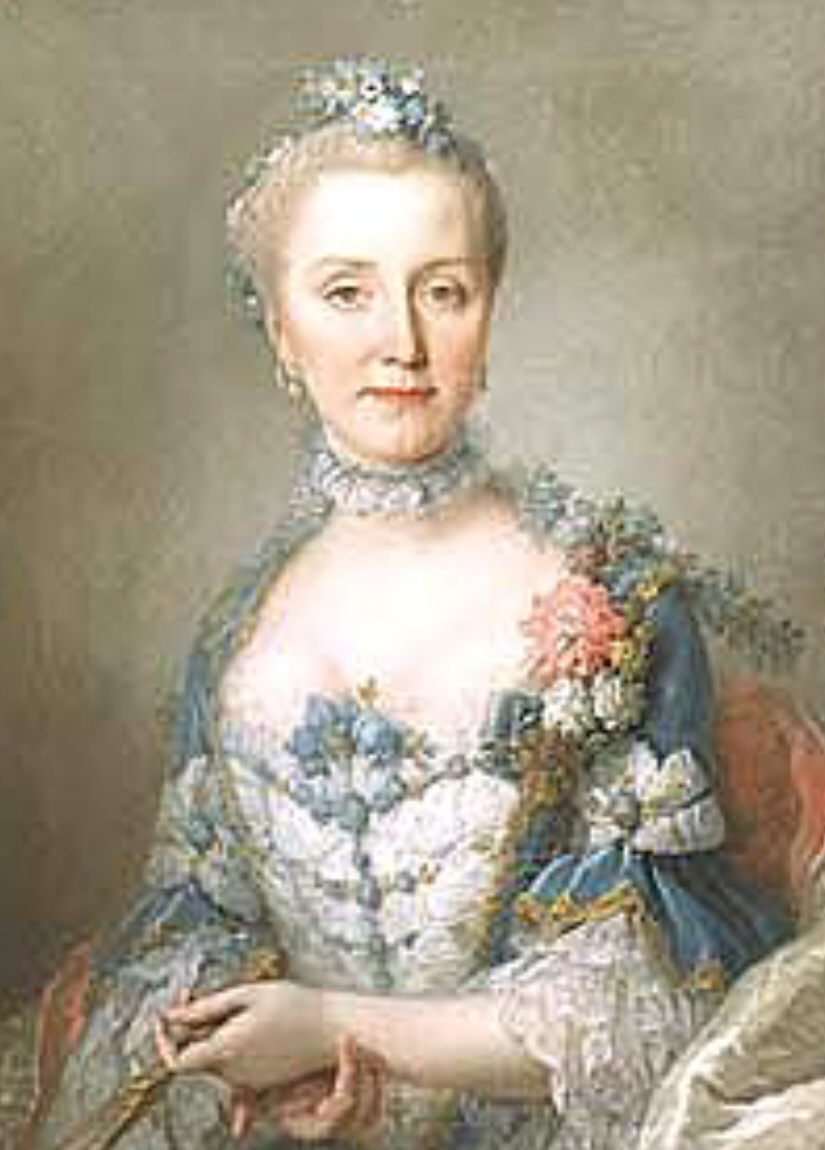
Caroline von Schimmelmann

Caroline von Schimmelmann, née Tugendreich Friedeborn (1730–1795), was a Danish countess.

Her parentage is unknown, but she was the foster daughter of Heinrich Ernst von Gersdorfs in Dresden, and given a good education by him. She married Heinrich Carl von Schimmelmann in 1747. Her spouse had an important role within Danish government from 1762, and the couple became central figures within the Danish aristocracy. The masquerade balls hosted by the Schimmelmann couple in their palace in Copenhagen belonged to the foremost centers of Danish society life in the 1760s, and these balls were later blamed to have encouraged queen Caroline Matilda's adultery with Struensee: the couple were also noted to have behaved suspiciously at them.

Schimmelmann belonged to the queen's closest circle of friends, and was decorated with the Matildeordenen in 1771. Described as an intelligent and kind character, who managed her household and the upbringing of her children with good economic sense, she was also regarded as an attractive woman who looked much younger than her years, and had herself the major Seneca Otto Falkenskjold for a lover.

However, the queen's relationship with Struensee made her worried, and her close favor with the queen caused a conflict in the connection between her spouse and Count Johann Hartwig Ernst von Bernstorff. Her spouse was asked to use his wife to influence the queen to end her affair with Struensee, but he refused and commented that the queen was their ruler and did as she pleased.

The Schimmelmann couple was not affected by the fall of Struensee and the queen in January 1772, despite Caroline von Schimmelmann's position as the queen's intimate friend, and her spouse made a successful career in the new regime. After his death in 1782, Caroline von Schimmelmann retired as society hostess and spent the rest of her life moving about between the homes of her children.

In 1774–75, her son Ernst Schimmelmann belonged to the conspirators around Nathaniel William Wraxall, who planned to install queen Caroline Matilda as regent of Denmark.
