= Christian Albert Clemmensen =

Danish journalist

Christian Albert Clemmensen (19 February 1869 – 27 December 1937) was a Danish journalist and author. He was president of the Danish Union of Journalists from 1926–1930.

== Life and career ==
Clemmensen was born in Copenhagen on 19 February 1869, the son of Sergeant Mads Clemmensen and Sidsel Clemmensen (née Albrechtsen). He graduated from Østre Borgerdydskole in 1887. Clemmensen worked as a journalist at Samfundet, Nationaltidende, and Dagens Nyheder. He was president of the Danish Union of Journalists in 1926–1930 and a board member of Dansk Arbejde. He wrote books about the commercial and cultural history of Denmark.

== Selected works ==
- Haandværkerforeningen i Kjøbenhavn. Bidrag til Foreningens Historie i Aarene 1890-1915, Haandværkerforeningen (1915)
- Tivoli gennem 75 Aar (1918)
- Vægter-Bogen (1926)
- Omkring Københavns Kvægtorv (1929)
- Forlagsboghandler G. E. C. Gad (1930)
- Johannes Neye. 1881-5. Oktober-1931 (1931)
