= Heinrich Carl von Schimmelmann =

German-born Danish merchant, banker and politician (1724–1782)

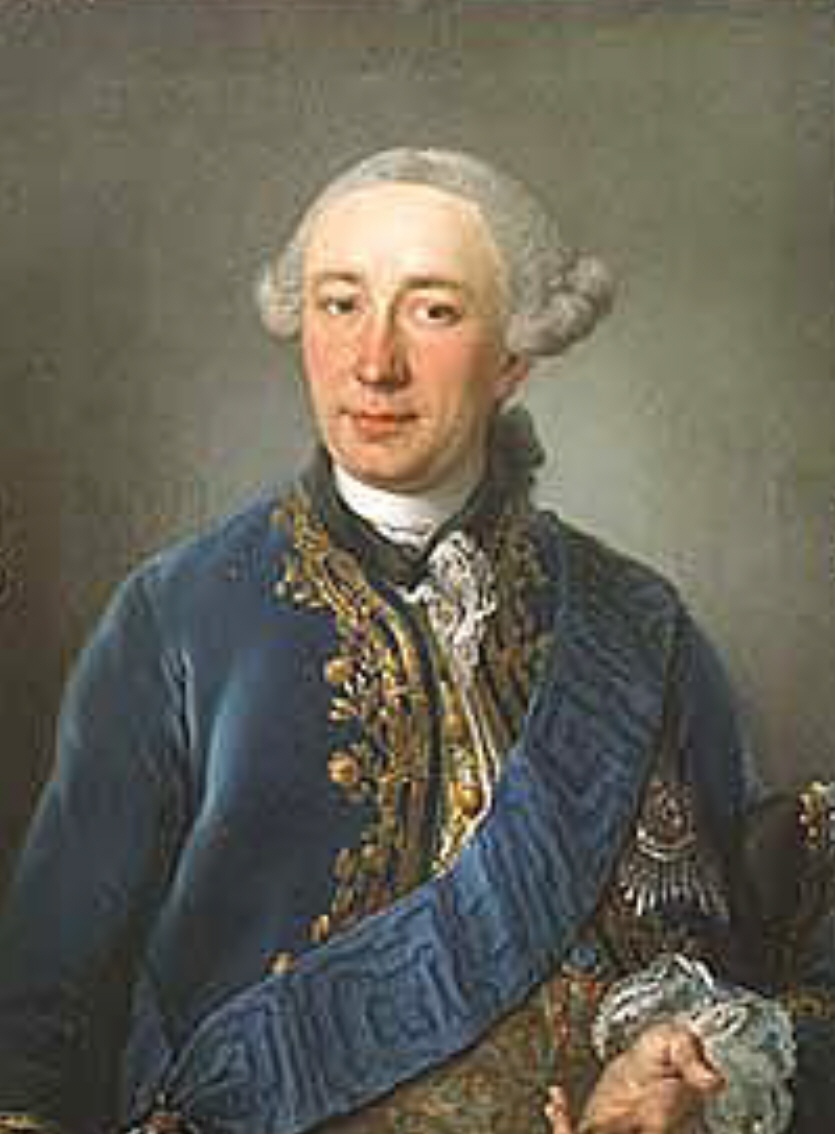
- c. 1762 portrait of von Schimmelmann
- Born: 13 July 1724; Demmin, Pommern
- Died: 16 February 1782 (aged 57); Copenhagen, Denmark
- Resting place: Schimmelmann-Mausoleum, Wandsbek Markt, Hamburg
- Occupations: Businessman, politician
- Spouse: Caroline von Schimmelmann
- Children: Ernst Heinrich von Schimmelmann, Julie Reventlow

Heinrich Carl von Schimmelmann (13 July 1724 – 16 February 1782) was a German-born Danish merchant, banker and politician. He was the largest Danish slave owner and slave trader, owning over 1,000 slaves in his plantations in the Danish-owned West Indies. He became one of the absolute richest people in Denmark and, among other things, owned the Odd Fellow Palace. During the Seven Years' War, he speculated heavily on currency debasement in close association with his business partner Abel Seyler. After supporting Denmark–Norway as the head of the banking system in Denmark, he was rewarded by becoming a member of the Danish nobility. Eventually, he became a plantation owner (and slave owner) and Danish finance minister. From 1774 onwards, von Schimmelmann was involved in the project of digging the Eider Canal. He died in 1782.

== Early life and career ==
His father Diedrich Jacob was a merchant and city councillor in Demmin, Swedish Pommerania, who sent him out learning the trade in Stettin. In 1746 he set up a supplies store in sugar, coffee and tobacco in Dresden. On 4 March 1747, at the age of 23, he married then 17-year-old Caroline Tugendreich Friedeborn. In 1755, Schimmelmann was responsible for tariff collection in Kursachsen. By the end of 1756 he delivered grain and flour to the Prussian army and was appointed as Geheimrat. In December 1756 or 1757 he bought pillaged Meissen porcelain from the Prussian king, which were shipped in 110 cases to Hamburg, and auctioned on 11 July 1758. (He secretly returned a part to the Saxon king August III.) In April Frederick the Great ordered him to contact Veitel Heine Ephraim and Daniel Itzig and deliver silver to the two mint masters who were leasing all the Prussian mints. Already in July 1758 Schimmelmann leased the mint in Schwerin (Mecklenburg) from Frederick II, Duke of Mecklenburg-Schwerin and started to compete with Ephraim & Itzig. Schimmelmann produced debased coins, but with a higher silver content than the debased Prussian coins. Schimmelmann employed more than a hundred people at the end of 1759; one year later already almost 300 people.

== Connection with Denmark ==
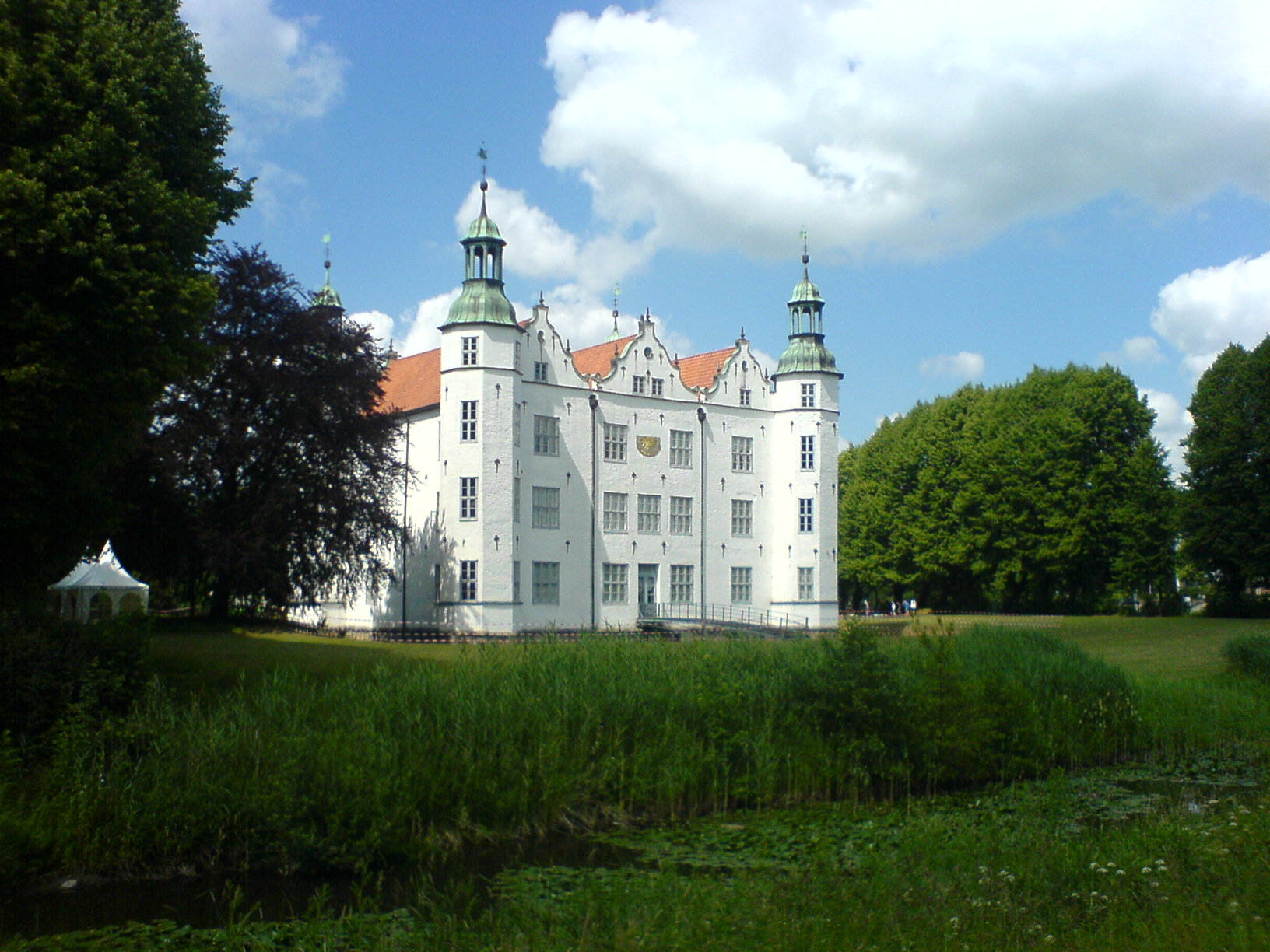
Ahrensburg

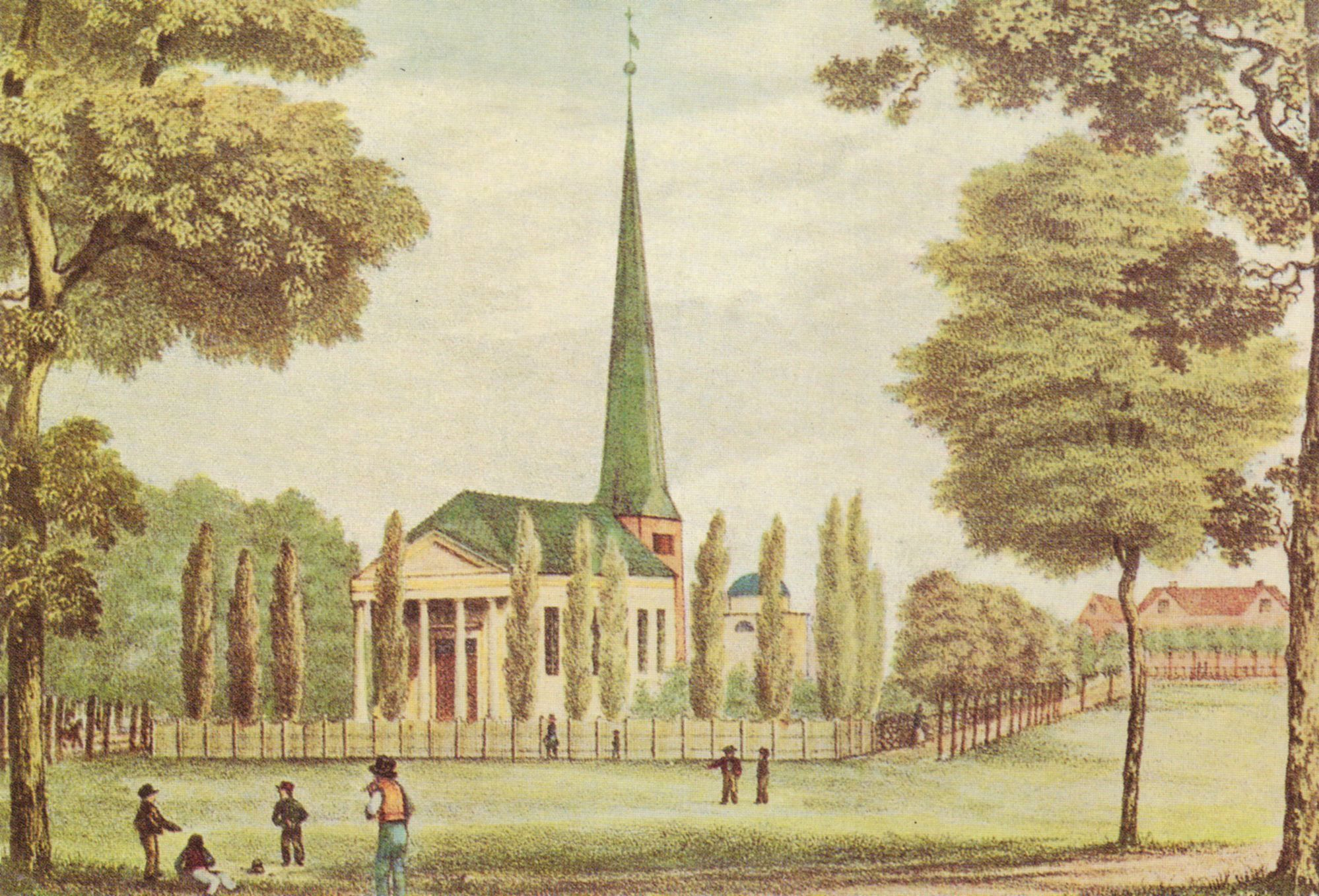
Wandsbek with Schimmelmann mausoleum behind the church

The city of Hamburg did not allow him to settle within the walls, but with a trick, using his bookkeeper he succeeded to buy a mansion in 1758. In 1759 he bought the Ahrensburg estate in Holstein (paying cash) and became a Danish citizen. Early 1761 Schimmelmann leased the mints in Neustrelitz and Rethwisch, Stormarn and ordered Abel Seyler and his partner Johann Martin Tilleman to produce worse coins. The head of the Danish government, Count von Bernstorff, realized how Schimmelmann's talents as a merchant could benefit the state of Denmark during those times of financial duress. In July 1761 Schimmelmann became a financial advisor for the king, Frederik V of Denmark. Schimmelmann introduced an extraordinary income tax, to be paid in silver, which led to unrest in the country. In 1762 he bought an estate in Wandsbek, closer to Hamburg. He appointed Johann Heinrich Gottlob Justi to improve the refining of silver and copper from debased coins through cupellation. Justi succeeded by using coal.

In cooperation with his business partner Abel Seyler Schimmelmann produced large amounts of coins (so-called Heckmünzen), that were exported to various German states during the war. The furnace in Rethwisch was taken over by Veitel Ephraim in 1762 and stopped.

The financial situation in Denmark at the time was dire, due to the large army of 20–25.000 soldiers stationed in Holstein, the rearmament following the aggression of Peter III of Russia in 1762, after the death of Frederick Charles, Duke of Schleswig-Holstein-Sonderburg-Plön. Because it was hard for the Danish state to get loans at the time, Denmark had tried to get funds through seignorage, but this destabilized both the state and the banks responsible. Lacking men of financial capacity, Schimmelmann's talents and reputation was utilized to get favourable loans from Amsterdam to keep the Danish state and financial system afloat. In the years 1762–1765, Schimmelmann continued his work of securing the Danish government, sometimes even through loans of his own.

Schimmelmann on his own part benefited from the connection with the Danish government both due to Denmark's neutrality being beneficial for trade, and for reasons of prestige. Negotiations soon led to Schimmelmann being appointed as second in command to the Danish attaché in Hamburg, and the connection with Denmark was solidified by buying property in Copenhagen and Himmerland. Schimmelmann received the title of Baron of Lindenborg and the Order of the Dannebrog (April 1762).

== Influence on tax policies ==
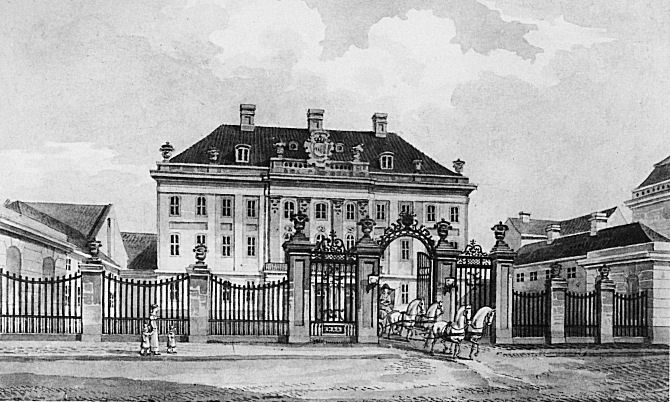
Schimmelmann Palace in Copenhagen

To better the state's finances, Heinrich Carl von Schimmelmann decided on an extraordinary poll tax in September 1762. It would have been too difficult at the time to create a progressive income tax, but the brutality of the poll tax led to civil unrest. However, it secured the state finances and stabilized the financial markets.

An advisory board was created in December 1762 with von Schimmelmann as a member, through which he became de facto administrator of Denmark's taxes and deficit. With short interruptions, this influence over the state's finances continued until his death.

== Private business ==
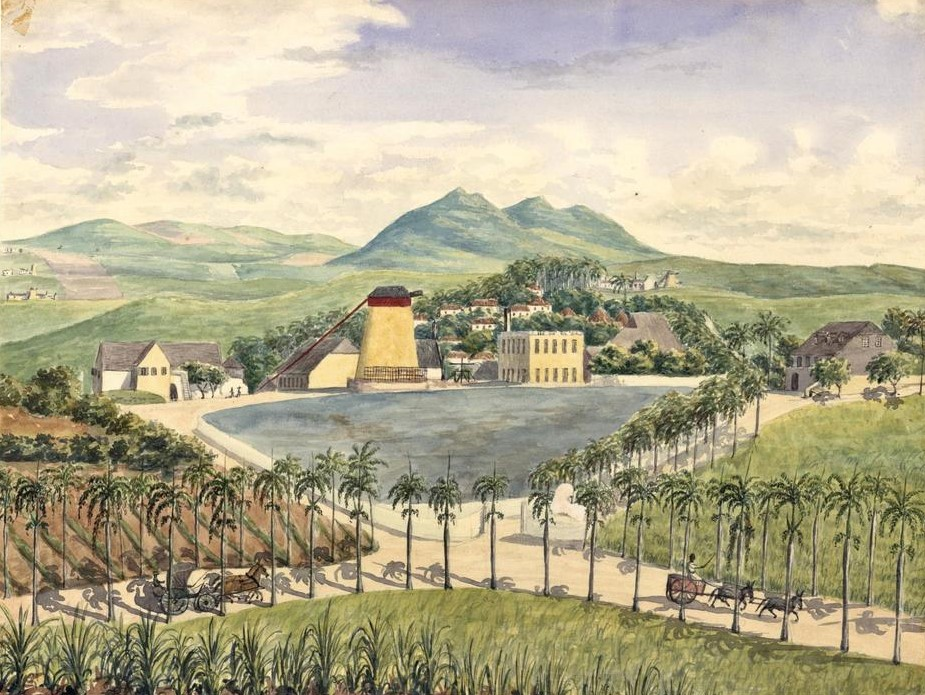
The Schimmelmann family's plantation on St. Croix in the Danish West Indies

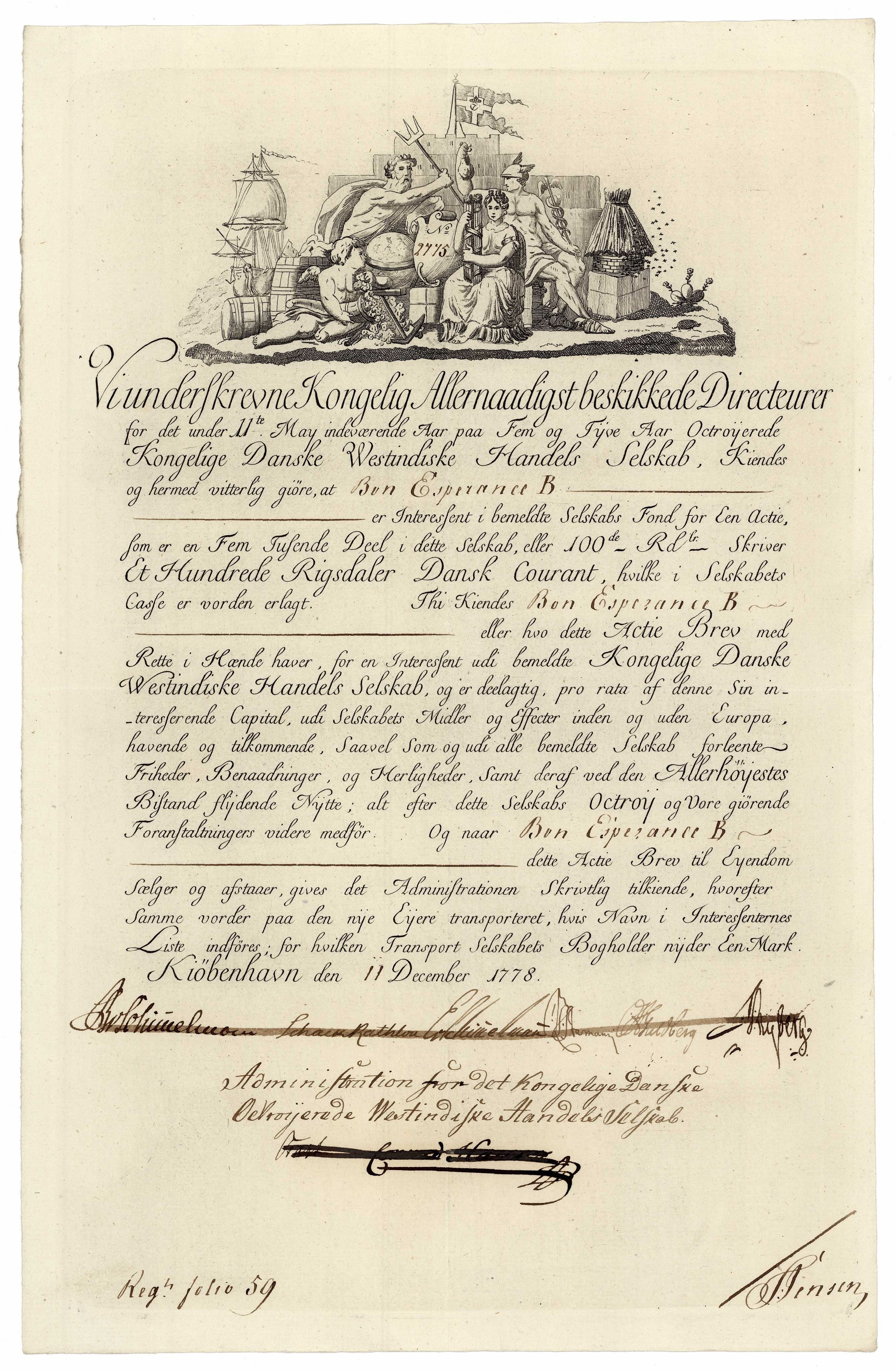
Share of the Royal West Indian Trading Company, issued 11. December 1778, signed by director Heinrich Carl von Schimmelmann

Besides his duties as overseer of Denmark's taxes, von Schimmelmann also ran his own private business, having bought in March or April 1763 several of the largest Danish sugar plantations in the Danish West Indies, including La Grande Princesse near Christiansted and La Grange at Frederiksted on St. Croix, and a sugar refinery in Copenhagen for 400,000 rigsdaler. Schimmelmann became the largest plantation owners in the Danish West-Indies. The plantations used slave labour from the Danish trading stations in present-day Ghana. Through the work of von Schimmelmann's son Ernst Heinrich von Schimmelmann among others, the slave trade was banned in 1792 (effective from 1803).

Schimmelmann also bought the Hammermøllen rifle factory north of Helsingør from the government for 70.000 Rigsdaler in 1768. Hellebækgård and the rifle factory, collectively known as Hellebækgård Manor (Danish: Hellebækgård Gods), was purchased by Schimmelmann in 1768. Schimmelmann commissioned Philip de Lange to remodel the house. In 1770, Schimmelmann moved the inn to another building while a chapel was installed in the east wing in its place.

However, the goal of his public endeavours was mostly the development of foreign trade. When Schimmelmann sought after a trade surplus, he thought it was especially important for a country like Denmark, where fiat money was the only means of payment. Through trade, one could avoid a weakening (depreciation) of the currency compared to other countries. Besides, the development of trade would improve domestic wealth and thus also the tax revenue and state finances.

He became connected with this important endeavour when he on 7 March 1767 was made deputy of the Kommercekollegiet (College of Commerce), and in December when he was given a seat in the newly formed Trade Balance Commission, which was supposed to investigate the state's finances and trade balance. Before Schimmelmann, other traders based in Copenhagen had realized that due to Denmark's lack of naturally exportable goods, it was necessary to start intermediary trade with overseas goods as compensation. This, among other factors, led to the formation of the Danish East India Company. Schimmelmann wanted to further this by establishing a free port in Copenhagen, which probably would have been accomplished had it not been for the influence of Johann Friedrich Struensee.

== Personal life ==
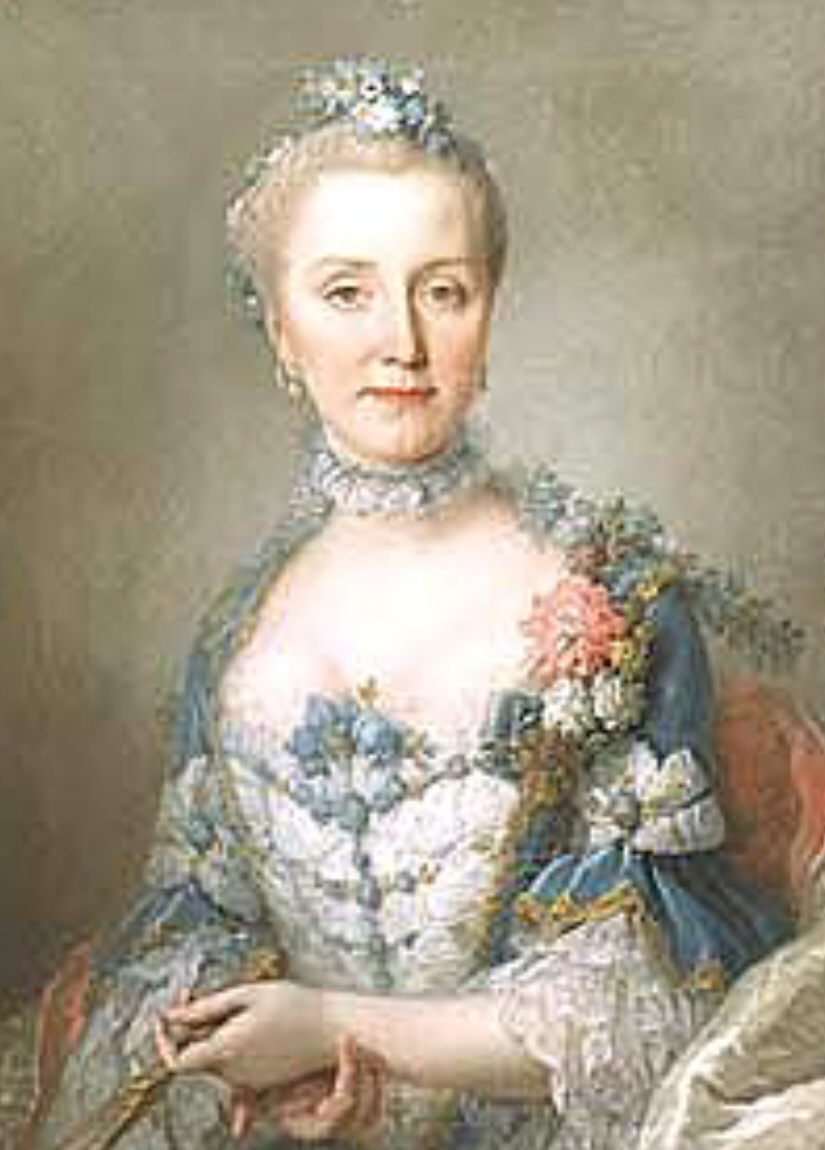
Caroline von Schimmelmann, c. 1762

Schimmelmann had 9 children with his wife, 6 sons and 3 daughters. The oldest child was his son Ernst Heinrich von Schimmelmann, who followed in father's footsteps, becoming both Minister of Finance and Minister of Foreign Affairs.

Besides his extensive career, von Schimmelmann enjoyed an excellent social life. His wife understood how to host great parties in the couple's winter home in Copenhagen, with royally approved masquerades. The summers were spent in the splendid castle Ahrensburg in Holstein. His circle of friends included the Danish statesmen with Bernstorff the Elder as the centre, with whom he agreed on other political subjects. For example, Schimmelmann co-negotiated an agreement settling the Gottorp Question on 27 May 1768 between Hamburg on one side, and Denmark and Gottorp on the other, where the Holstein-Gottorp territories of Schleswig-Holstein were taken over by the King.

== Relationship to Christian VII ==
Due to his many-faceted political influence, Schimmelmann came into close contact with the mentally-ill King Christian VII, with whom he also travelled abroad in 1768. His influence on the King was mostly due to the King's respect for von Schimmelmann's knowledge of trade and finance, and the King consulted with Schimmelmann on many occasions, e.g. regarding how much the country could spend on the army. Schimmelmann gained greater influence than Bernstorff ever could, and so it was von Schimmelmann, that convinced the King to banish the notorious prostitute Støvlet-Cathrine from Copenhagen in 1768.

Besides reflecting his personal abilities, Schimmelmann's influence also shows the importance of money. In this context, it was unfortunate that he both served the role as financial advisor and made money by serving as a bank and lender for the state. The possible conflict of interests was often pointed out by his enemies, as he used his official position to earn money as a trader. Even though he in no way cheated the state, this still put him in a bad light

== Age of Struensee ==
During von Schimmelmann's rising influence, Struensee came to power in 1770. As the insane King's physician, Struensee came to be de facto regent, and deposed many of the statesmen besides Schimmelmann, before finally being overthrown and executed in 1772. Schimmelmann, however, was still valuable to the new men in power, and so decided to work with the new leaders to salvage what he could of his old policies, as well as securing his own personal business endeavours. He succeeded beyond all expectations due to the goodwill of Struensee and his fellows, who made him a member of a commission established on 28 December 1770 with the purpose of settling the main economic questions of the day. His wife also made good use of the new political climate, becoming close friends with Struensee's lover, Queen Caroline Matilda.

Von Schimmelmann's favourable position with Struensee influenced his relationship with former statesmen like Bernstorff once they came back into power. Schimmelmann, however, had a personal dislike for Struensee, who on his part wanted to sever the ties with Schimmelmann once possible. In the spring of 1771, Schimmelmann began withdrawing from his financial ties with the state. In the same year, the Treasury and the College of Commerce were closed down as the state financial system was being restructured to accommodate those in power, so Schimmelmann's influence was diminished. However, careful as he was, Schimmelmann never completely severed the ties with either Struensee or the old circle of power, and thus retained his place in the limelight.

== Age of Guldberg ==
After Struensee's fall, the King's half-brother Frederick was made Regent, with his mother, Queen Juliana Maria and minister Ove Høegh-Guldberg as de facto rulers. This power transition enabled Schimmelmann to wield influence once again. Formally, his power lay in his position as a member of the Tax Board, and in a seat on an extraordinary financial committee created in October 1772. The Treasury was reinstated on 3 July 1773, with Schimmelmann as its director. Schimmelmann was also awarded the Order of the Elephant in 1773, and made Count in 1779.

The records of the time reflect Schimmelmann's wide-ranging influence. At the start, he made sure that A. P. Bernstorff (Bernstorff the Younger) was reinstated and made head of the German Chancellery, and that Adolph Sigfried von der Osten was removed from the State Council in the spring of 1773. Furthermore, he facilitated the King's divorce from his unfaithful queen. Schimmelmann and Bernstorff the Younger were quite close, and Schimmelmann was often consulted in financial matters. One result of this was the nationalization of the Bank of Copenhagen in March 1773, which came under the Tax Board, and thus under Schimmelmann's personal leadership until his death.

Meanwhile, Schimmelmann had great influence on the state's finances even though he did not have a seat on the College of Finance, an influence admiringly reflected in Bernstorff the Younger's letters about his absolute leadership over the state's fixed expenses and a great influence on other colleges. Bernstorff writes: “Schimmelmann is the soul in everything that happens in the internal affairs of the State. Even when decisions are made without him, it is as if he hastened their execution”. Naturally, Schimmelmann could not have had such influence unopposed. It was only possible with the support from the de facto rulers, Queen Juliana Maria and Høegh-Guldberg. Once again, those in power had a great appreciation for Schimmelmann's financial abilities, and he knew how to stay on good terms with them.

== Mercantilism ==
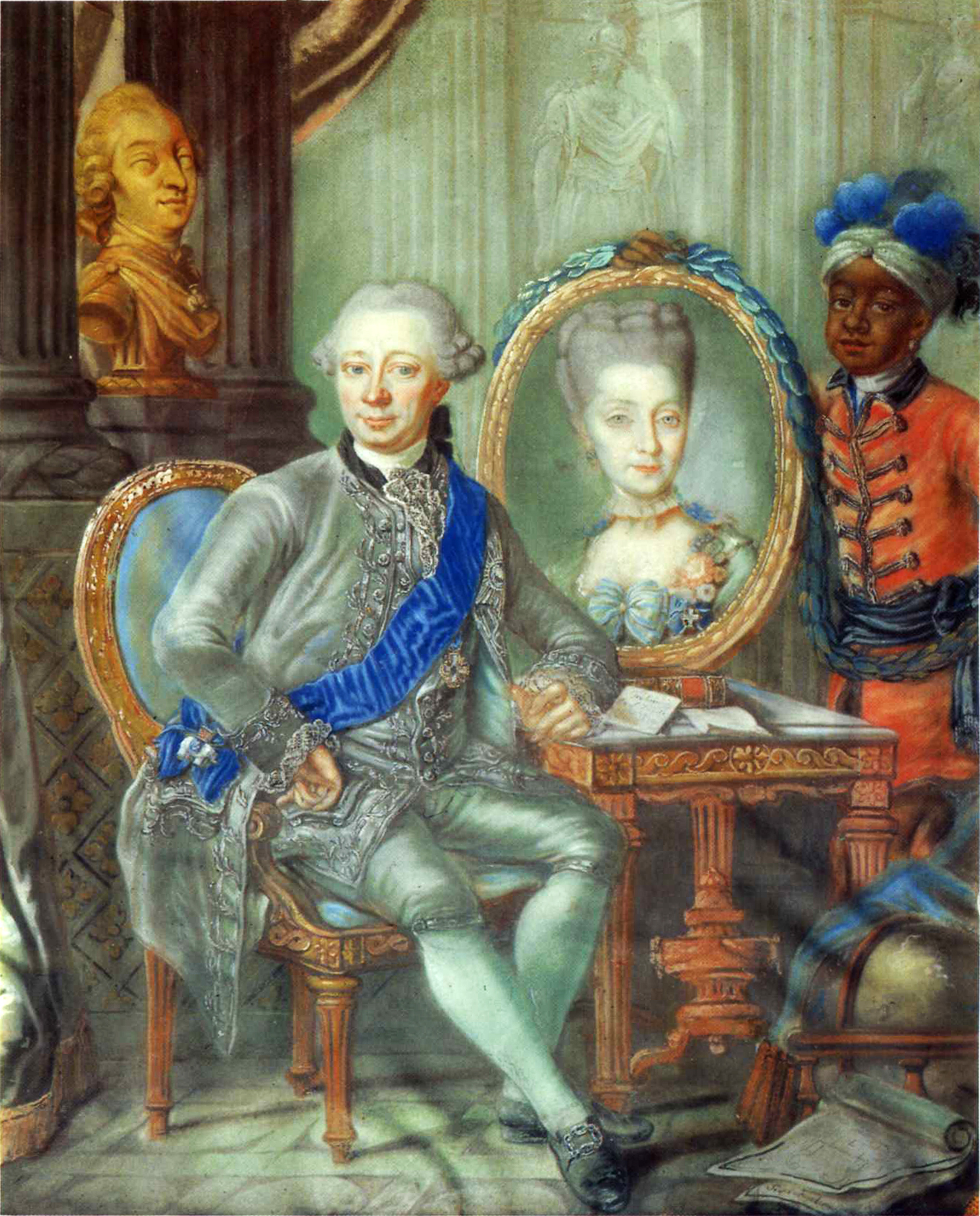
Heinrich Carl von Schimmelmann, ca. 1773

The effect of this cooperation shone through on the trade policy of the time. Thus, it was at this time that the protectionist system of mercantilism was carried through in the age of Guldberg, both with regards to industry and trade, even to the extent that the state became involved in shipbuilding, fishing and overseas trade. It was decided that the government should begin fishing to a great extent in the northern seas, capturing whales and seals. These activities were connected with the royal trade with then-colonies Greenland and Iceland, which required large-scale investments in shipbuilding. Although Guldberg showed great enthusiasm for these projects, it was Schimmelmann who was responsible for the government's attitude towards them, due to Schimmelmann's great influence over Guldberg and in every aspect of the state's finances.

This was also the case for another important decision, which was thought to be very important for trade, namely the excavation of the so-called Eider Canal in Schleswig-Holstein, connecting the Baltic Sea and the North Sea using stretches of the Eider River, which was completed in 1784.

== Death ==
By the end of the 1770s, Schimmelmann's health started to decline. Although he still found comfort in his work, it hurt him to see that his high hopes for Denmark's finances were disappointed as the country was hit by inflation, and when A. P. Bernstorff was fired in 1780. Heinrich Carl von Schimmelmann died - as the richest man in Denmark - in Copenhagen on 15 February 1782, at the age of 58. He is buried in Wandsbek outside of Hamburg.

== Legacy ==
Although always a merchant with an eye for his own advantage, Schimmelmann was dutiful in his work for his adopted country Denmark. From the first years after moving to Denmark, he gained great honors by saving the country from a dire financial situation, and later exhibiting extraordinary skills in many other areas. His legacy has been attacked – not without justification – because the state takeover of the Bank of Copenhagen in 1773 in the long run led to inflation due to the unhealthy temptation of printing money whenever the state needed it. The ways in which he allowed the state to intervene in the economic activities of the day had negative effects already in his lifetime.

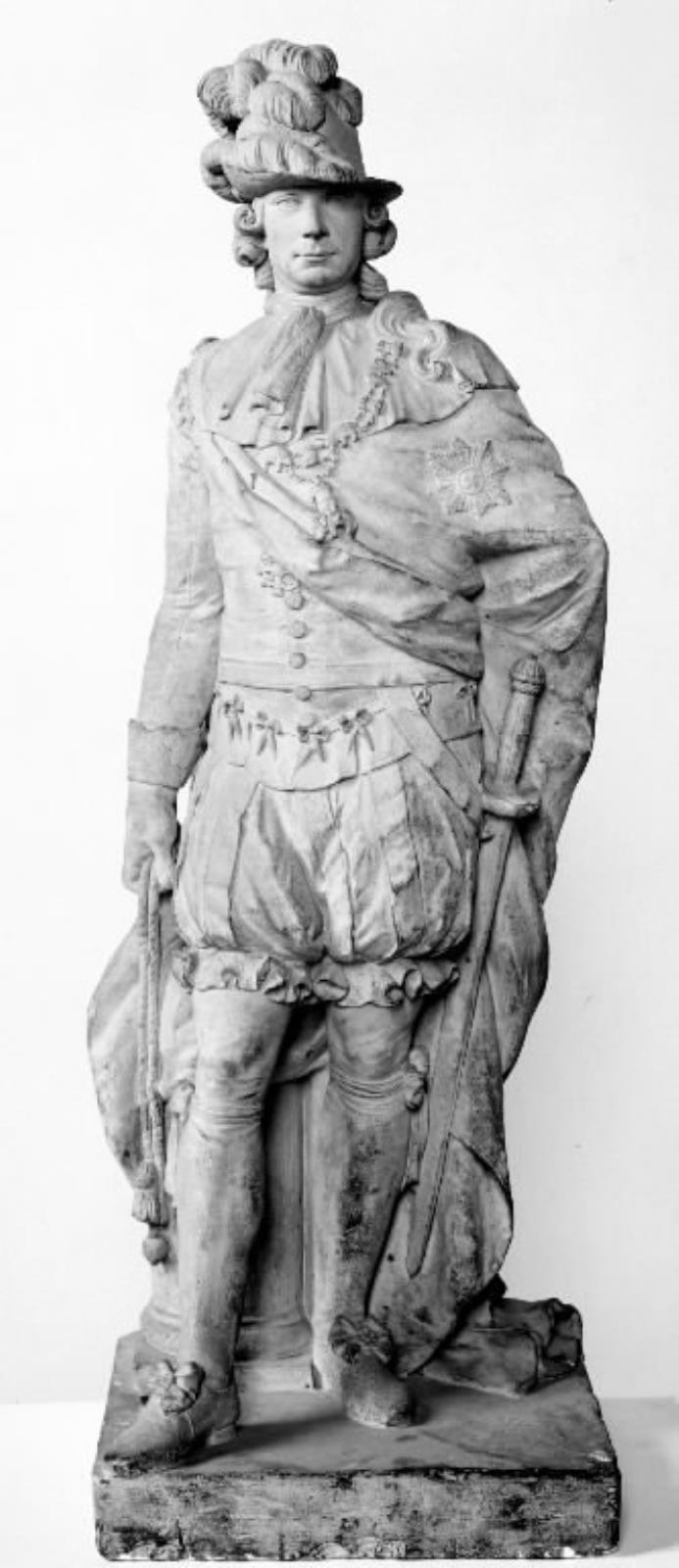
Figurine by Luigi di Giuseppe Grossi of Schimmelmann wearing the Order of the Elephant.

== Sources ==
- Heinrich Carl von Schimmelmann entry in the Dansk biografisk Lexikon
- Bro-Jørgensen, J.O. Heinrich Carl Schimmelmann: En studie i skatmesterens fortid. Copenhagen: Fremad, 1970. ISBN 978-8755701588.
- Degn, Christian. Die Schimmelmanns im atlantischen Dreieckshandel: Gewinn und Gewissen. Neumünster: Wachholtz, 1974. ISBN 978-3529061486.
- Maletzke, Erich. Schimmelmann: Schatzmeister des Königs. (Historical fiction.) Neumünster: Wachholtz, 2009. ISBN 978-3529061257.
- Schovelin, Julius. Fra den danske Handels Empire: Forhold og Personer i det 18. Aarhundredes sidste Halvdel. (2 vols.) Copenhagen: Det Nordiske Forlag, 1899–1900. Online edition (photographed), Internet Archive
