= Ernst Heinrich von Schimmelmann =

German-born Danish politician, businessman and philanthropist

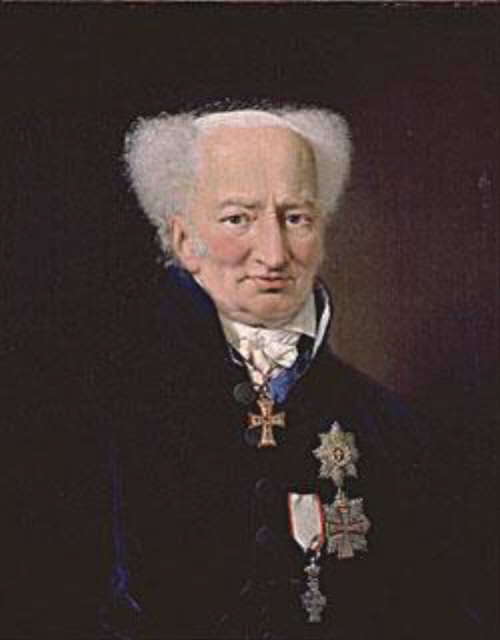
- Ernst Schimmelmann portrayed by Christian Albrecht Jensen (1827)

Prime minister of Denmark
- Predecessor: Joachim Godske Moltke
- Successor: Otto Joachim Moltke
- Born: 4 December 1747; Dresden, Saxony, Germany
- Died: 9 February 1831 (aged 83); Copenhagen, Denmark
- Buried: St. Peter's Church, Copenhagen
- Spouses: Emilie Rantzau (m. 1775; died 1780) Charlotte Schimmelmann (m. 1782; died 1816)
- Father: Heinrich Carl von Schimmelmann
- Mother: Caroline von Schimmelmann
- Occupation: Businessman, politician, estate owner

Ernst Heinrich von Schimmelmann (4 December 1747 – 9 February 1831) was a German-born Danish politician, businessman and philanthropist.

== Early life and career ==
Ernst von Schimmelmann was born in Dresden to Baron Heinrich Carl von Schimmelmann (1724–1782) and Caroline von Schimmelmann, who was the foster daughter of Heinrich Ernst von Gersdorf (1704–1755) in Dresden. His father was a successful merchant who made a fortune in war and became affiliated with the Danish government after moving to Hamburg and buying Schloss Ahrensburg in Schleswig-Holstein. Ernst studied economics in Europe and worked for his father.

== Career ==
From 1782, Ernst von Schimmelmann became a key figure in Denmark's financial administration, part of a so-called Trefoil of Counts which was completed by A. P. Bernstorff and Christian Ditlev Reventlow.

Due to disputes with the Minister of State, Ove Høegh-Guldberg, he had to resign in 1783 but the following year he took part in the coup d'état against Høegh-Guldberg and was appointed Minister of Finance in the new government, a post he held until 1813. From 1824 to 1831 he was Minister of Foreign Affairs.

=== Plantation owner and views on slavery ===
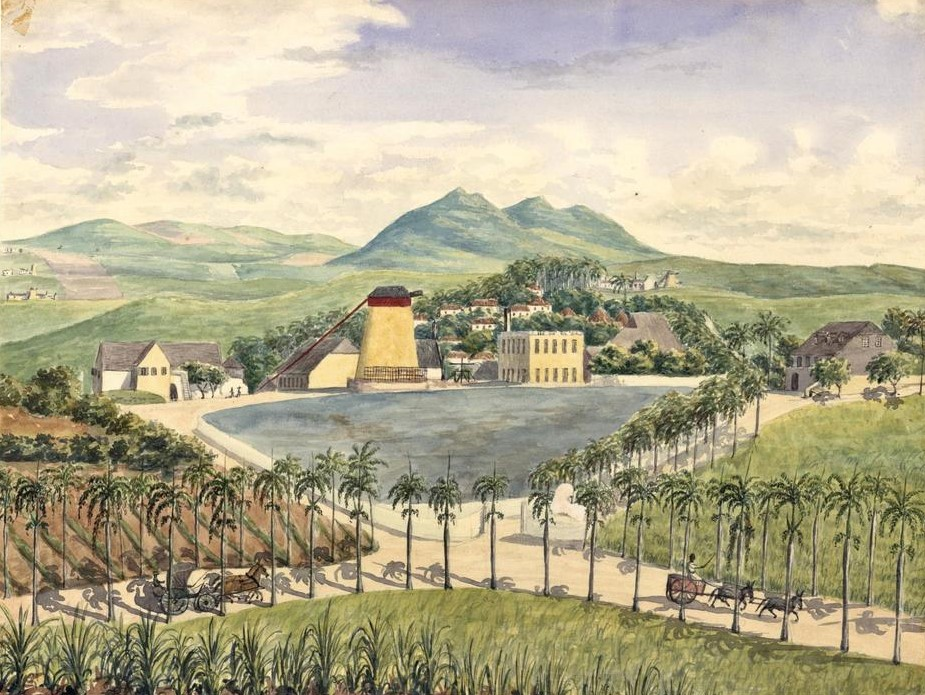
Constitution Hill, the Schimmelmann family plantation on St. Croix

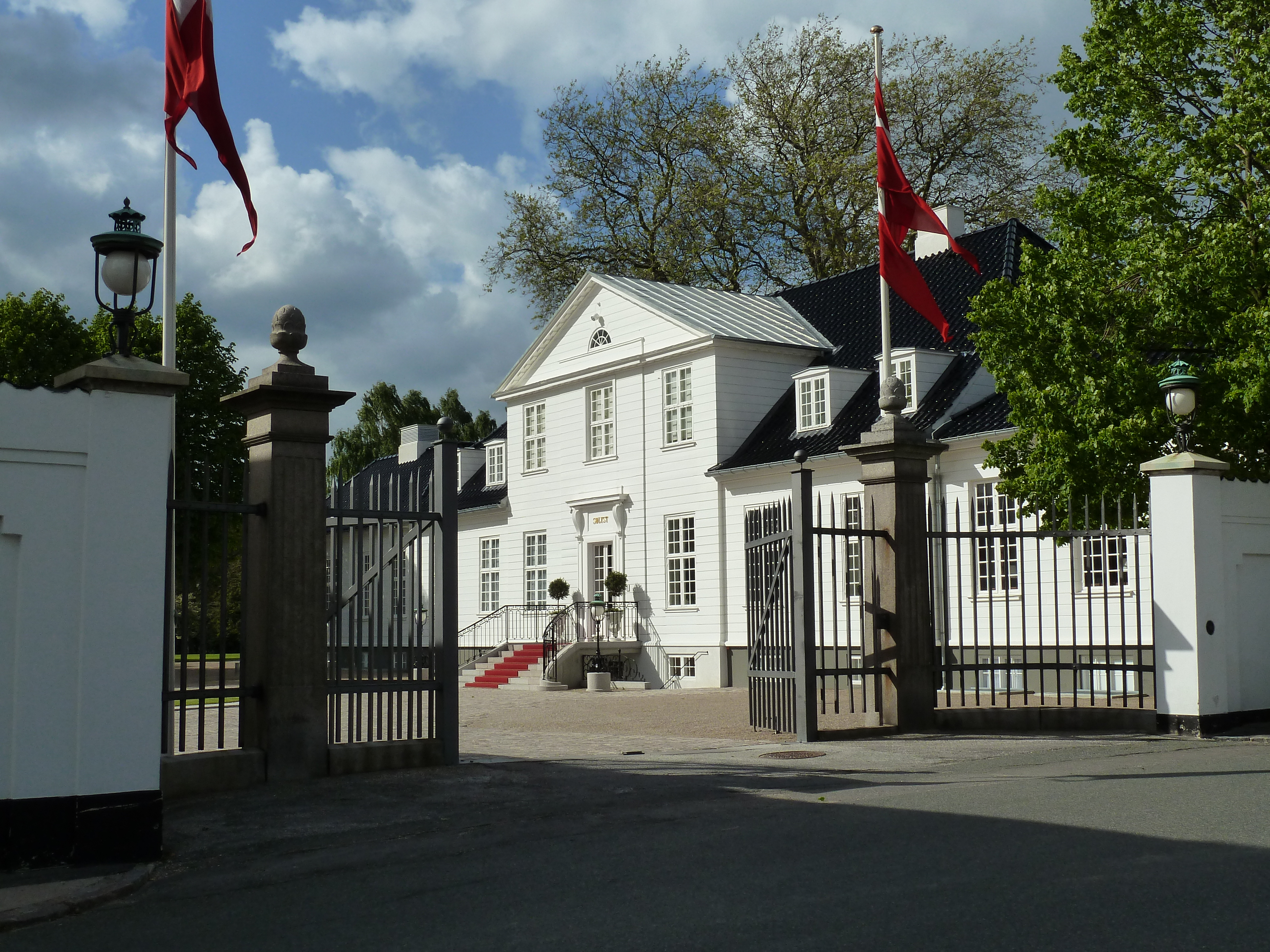
Sølyst in Klampenborg

He contributed to the abolition of the Danish slave trade by showing in a report, how the trade was inhumane and led to deficits. In the report, he also argued how better treatment of slaves in the Danish West Indies could reduce the large child mortality rates there, which each year substantially reduced the enslaved population. Schimmelmann was not against slavery, but rather the Atlantic slave trade. Ernst Heinrich von Schimmelmann was a slave owner himself, inheriting a large sugar plantation on the island of Saint Croix and being a shareholder in a company that transported slaves from the Gold Coast.

As Minister of Finance, Schimmelmann's work to stop the slave trade was started in 1792. Previously there had been no restrictions on the trade, and as a compensation, he introduced government-subsidized loans for purchasing slaves prior to the ban. The Schimmelmann family became the richest family in Denmark in the 18th century largely and dominated the economic fabric of Denmark.

== Family ==
In 1775, Schimmelmann married Countess Emilie Caroline Rantzau, who died of tuberculosis 5 years later at the age of 28. Schimmelmann remarried in 1782, and moved with his new wife Charlotte (née Schubart) to his country home Sølyst in Klampenborg. In 1782, he raised a Classicistic monument called Emiliekilde in Klampenborg to the memory of his first wife.

Ernst Heinrich von Schimmelmann and his family are buried in St. Peter's Church, Copenhagen (Sankt Petri Kirk), a church for which he was patron from 1800 until his death.

== In culture and legacy ==
Schimmelmann is one of the characters in the historical novel Druknehuset (Samlernes Forlag. 2008) by Maria Helleberg. The plot starts when a drenched corpse shows up on his doorstep.

The street Schimmelmannsvej in Charlottenlund is named after him.

Political offices
Preceded by Joachim Godske Moltke	Privy Councillor of Denmark; 1818–1824	Succeeded by Otto Joachim Moltke
