= Charlotte Schimmelmann =

Danish noblewoman and salonist

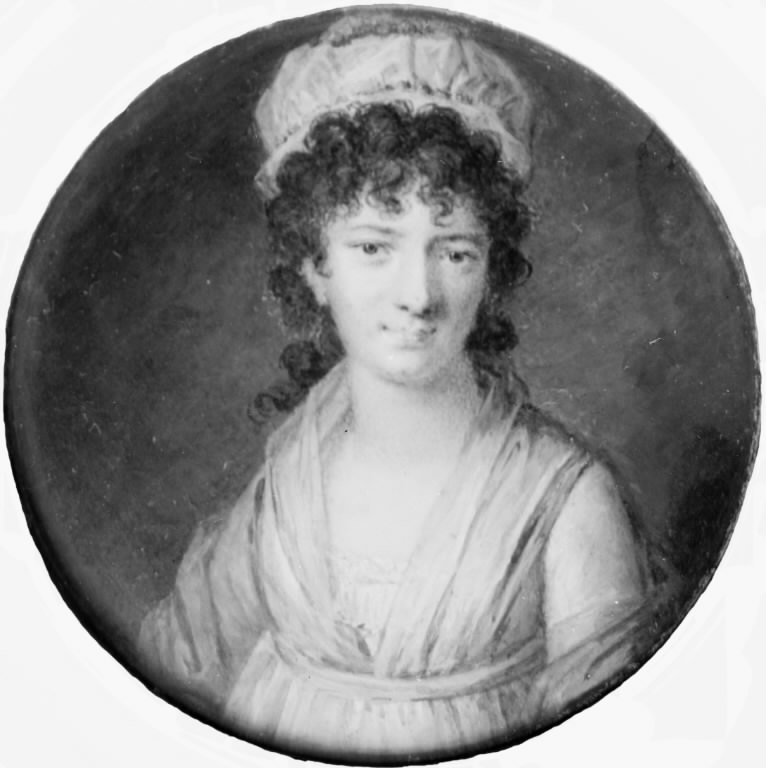
- Charlotte Schimmelmann, miniature portrait by Cornelius Høyer (c. 1800)
- Born: 10 August 1757; Skien, Norway
- Died: 2 December 1816 (aged 59); Copenhagen, Denmark
- Known for: Salons
- Spouse: Ernst Heinrich von Schimmelmann

Magdalene Charlotte Hedevig Schimmelmann (10 August 1757 – 2 December 1816) was a Danish noblewoman and salonist.

== Biography ==
Magdalene Charlotte Schubart was born at Fossum in Skien, Norway to Lieutenant Carl Rudolph Schubart (1714–59) and Inger Løvenskiold (1732–1808). On 25 May 1782, she married the statesman Count Ernst Heinrich von Schimmelmann (1747–1831). After the coup d'état against Ove Høegh-Guldberg in 1784, he became Minister of Finance until 1813 and later Prime Minister.

Her salon was organized according to the French pattern and was renowned abroad. The latest developments in science, politics and culture were discussed. She considered it a profession to be a salonist. Her salon gathered philosophers and politicians, and played a part in the country's political scene. It was inspired by a form of "aristocratic humanism", and by the ideas of the French Revolution in 1789.

Her husband opened schools, which she protected, and argued for the abolition of slavery, even though they owned plantations in the Danish West Indies. The Schimmelmann family became the richest family in Denmark in the 18th century largely due to the sugar trade with the West Indies. Until 1807, her political circle of ministers earned money by trading with countries involved in the Napoleonic Wars, which made her salon considered to be a center of political corruption, which made it unfashionable.

== See also ==
- Louise Stolberg
- Sophia Magdalena Krag Juel Vind
