= List of lighthouses and lightvessels in Denmark =

This is a list of lighthouses and lightvessels in Denmark. Except for the island of Bornholm, Denmark is located at the transition between North Sea and Baltic Sea which includes the Skagerrak and Kattegat waters.

== Lighthouses ==
Name	Image	Water body	Region	Location Coordinates	Year built	Notes
Bovbjerg Lighthouse		North Sea	Central Denmark	Ferring, Lemvig Municipality; 56°30′47″N 08°07′10″E	1877	
Lodbjerg Lighthouse		North Sea	North Denmark	Lodbjerg, Thy; 56°49′24″N 08°15′45″E	1883	
Vesborg Lighthouse		Kattegat	Central Denmark	Vesborg, Samsø island 55°46′10″N 10°33′05″E	1858	
Hanstholm Lighthouse		North Sea/ Skagerrak	North Denmark	Hanstholm, Thy; 57°06′45″N 08°35′56″E	1843	
Hjelm Lighthouse		Kattegat	Central Denmark	Hjelm island 56°08′00″N 10°48′20″E	1856	
Fornæs Lighthouse		Kattegat	Central Denmark	Norddjurs Municipality; 56°26′36.3″N 10°57′26.3″E	1839	
Skagen Lighthouse		Skagerrak	North Denmark	Skagen; 57°44′08″N 10°37′49″E	1858	
Skagen's Vippefyr		Skagerrak	North Denmark	Skagen; 57°43′36″N 10°36′29″E	1627	
Skagen's White Lighthouse		Skagerrak	North Denmark	Skagen; 57°43′45″N 10°36′24″E	1747	
Hirtshals Lighthouse		Skagerrak	North Denmark	Hirtshals	1863	
Rubjerg Knude Lighthouse		Skagerrak	North Denmark	Lønstrup; 57°26′58″N 09°46′31″E	1900	
Christiansø Lighthouse		Baltic Sea	Bornholm	Christiansø; 55°19′27″N 15°11′29″E	1798	
Dueodde Lighthouse		Baltic Sea	Bornholm	Dueodde; 54°59′30″N 15°04′28″E	1962	
Hammeren Lighthouse		Baltic Sea	Bornholm	Hammeren; 55°17′11″N 14°45′55″E	1802	
Hammer Odde Lighthouse		Baltic Sea	Bornholm	Hammeren; 55°17′52″N 14°46′19″E	1885	
Rønne Lighthouse		Baltic Sea	Bornholm	Rønne; 55°05′58″N 14°41′46″E	1880	
Svaneke Lighthouse		Baltic Sea	Bornholm	Svaneke; 55°07′54″N 15°09′10″E	1919	
Blåvandshuk Lighthouse		North Sea	Central Denmark	Varde Municipality	1900	
Lightvessel Gedser Rev		Northern Bay of Mecklenburg	Zealand	Offshore south of Gedser Odde	1895	Registered as Lightvessel No. XVII (Danish: Fyrskib XVII Gedser Rev) this ship served on the Gedser Rev position until 1972. It is now a museum ship owned by the National Museum of Denmark.
Lågemade Lighthouse		Flensburg Firth	Southern Denmark	54°54′6.6″N 9°36′51.7″E	1896	Built in 1896 when the area belonged to Germany, this lighthouse provides the front light for a range of leading lights.
Lightvessel I		North Sea	Southern Denmark	Horns Rev west off Esbjerg	1913	This wooden ship was deactivated in 1980 and decommissioned in 1988. It is now a museum ship owned by a private foundation in Esbjerg.
Lightvessel XI		Various	Various	Offshore	1878	
Lightvessel XXI		Various	Various	Offshore	1911	Built in 1911, this wooden ship was mainly used at Horns Rev off the North Sea coast of Denmark. It was moored at Læsø island from 1945 to 1969 and had its final position at the Skagens Rev reef off Skagen Odde. The ship was decommissioned in 1988. As of 2006, it was used as a floating café in Ebeltoft.

== See also ==
- List of lighthouses in the Faroe Islands
- Lists of lighthouses and lightvessels
