= Skagen Bunker Museum =

Museum in Jutland, Denmark

Coordinates: 57°44′20″N 10°37′55″E

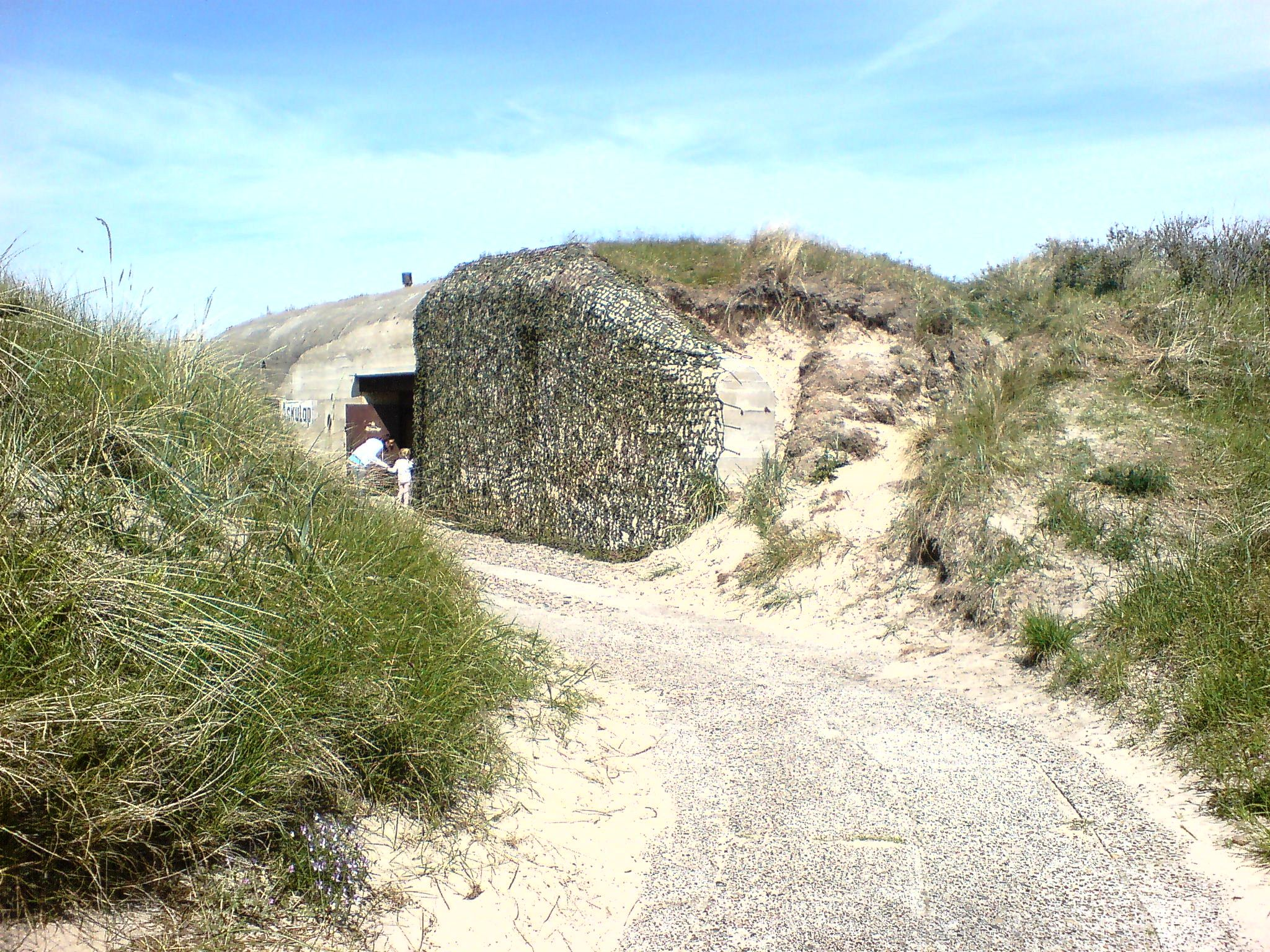
Skagen Bunker Museum

Skagen Bunker Museum is a private museum near the tip of Grenen in the far north of Jutland, Denmark. It is located in an old German bunker of the Regelbau 638 type which was used during the Second World War as an infirmary for treating wounded soldiers. It is now fitted out as a small museum with uniforms, weapons and other artifacts.

== Description ==
Located close to the spot where the Sand Worm (Sandormen) transports passengers to the end of Skagen Odde, a German bunker has been converted into a small war museum. It was established in 2008 by Martin Nielsen and Christian Forman Hansen. Although it is fitted out as an infirmary, it was apparently never used as such. It does nevertheless provide a good introduction to the German bunkers along the west coast of Jutland. The museum is open every day, from April to October, usually from 11 am to 4 pm but from 10 am to 5 pm in the high season.
