= Major Baltic inflow =

Inflow of saline water from the North Sea into the Baltic Sea

The Baltic Sea saltwater inflow, known as the major Baltic inflow (MBI), is a significant influx of saline water from the North Sea into the Baltic Sea through the Danish Straits. In the Baltic Sea, dense seawater from the North Sea sinks to the bottom and moves along the seabed, displacing the often oxygen-depleted water in the deep basins. Simultaneously, it transports new oxygen-rich water to the deep basins. These inflows are crucial for the Baltic Sea's ecosystem because they alleviate the oxygen depletion that commonly occurs in the deep basins of the poorly mixed sea, and at the same time, they prevent eutrophication caused by internal nutrient loading.

The two-layer circulation of the Baltic Sea presented as a schematic figure. Major Baltic inflows (MBIs) bring saline water from the North Sea to the Baltic Sea through the Danish Straits. Dense ocean water sinking to the depths of the Baltic Proper advances northward along the seafloor, displacing the low-oxygen water present in the deep basins.

== The process for MBI formation ==
The water in the Baltic Sea is brackish, meaning it has a low salinity. Each year, approximately 550 km^{3} of freshwater from rainfall and rivers within its drainage basin flow into the Baltic Sea. However, only about 100 km^{3} of water evaporates from the Baltic Sea into the atmosphere annually. This results in an excess of approximately 450 km^{3} of fresh water each year, which accounts for about two percent of the total volume of the Baltic Sea. To maintain a stable water level over the long term, the excess water flows out of the Baltic Sea through the Danish Straits into the North Sea. Periodic counterflow from the North Sea to the Baltic Sea prevents the Baltic from gradually turning into a freshwater basin.

The saltwater inflow, known as the major Baltic inflow (MBI), is said to occur when there is a strong overflow of saline water from the North Sea to the Baltic Sea over the cross-sections of the Darss Sill (Belt Sea) and the Drogden Sill (The Sound). Such a flow almost entirely destroys the salinity stratification in the areas of the sills for several days. Typically, the inflow event must last for at least five days to be classified as an MBI. During extremely powerful events, the Baltic Sea receives over 100 km^{3} of very saline water from the ocean, whereas during weaker MBIs, the volume is less than 100 km^{3}, averaging around 70 km^{3}.

Major Baltic inflows primarily occur during winter and early spring because weather conditions are most favorable for the inflow of saline water. First, the Baltic Sea must experience easterly and southeasterly winds for about 20 to 30 days, reducing precipitation within the Baltic Sea drainage basin, enhancing outflow from the basin, and causing a drop in the sea level. Before the arrival of the saline inflow, the Baltic Sea's surface level is typically around 26 centimeters lower than usual. Following this, a roughly one-month period of westerly winds begins, during which the sea level in the Kattegat rises, and pressure differences force the saline water from the North Sea through the narrow Danish Straits into the Baltic Sea. Throughout the entire inflow process, the Baltic Sea's water level rises on average by about 59 cm, with 38 cm occurring during the preparatory period and 21 cm during the actual saline inflow. The MBI itself typically lasts for 7–8 days.

The two principal time series of MBIs in the Baltic Sea. The newer DS5 time series (green bars above, Mohrholz 2018) is based on observations from the Darss Sill and includes all saltwater inflow events lasting over 5 days. The older FM96 time series (blue bars below, Fischer and Matthäus, 1996) has data gaps after 1976 when the l/v Gedser Rev ended salinity measurements. The newer time series shows cyclical variations in the occurrence of saline inflows at approximately 30-year intervals.

== Occurrence of MBIs ==
The formation of an MBI requires specific, relatively rare weather conditions. Between 1897 and 1976, approximately 90 MBIs were observed, averaging about one per year. Occasionally, there are even multi-year periods without any MBIs occurring. Large inflows that effectively renew the deep basin waters occur on average only once every ten years.

Very large MBIs have occurred in 1897 (330 km^{3}), 1906 (300 km^{3}), 1922 (510 km^{3}), 1951 (510 km^{3}), 1993/94 (300 km^{3}), and 2014/2015 (300 km^{3}). Large MBIs have on the other hand been observed in 1898 (twice), 1900, 1902 (twice), 1914, 1921, 1925, 1926, 1960, 1965, 1969, 1973, 1976, and 2003. The MBI that started in 2014 was by far the third largest MBI in the Baltic Sea. Only the inflows of 1951 and 1921/1922 were larger than it.

Previously, it was believed that there had been a genuine decline in the number of MBIs after 1980, but recent studies have changed our understanding of the occurrence of saline inflows. Especially after the lightship Gedser Rev discontinued regular salinity measurements in the Belt Sea in 1976, the picture of the inflows based on salinity measurements remained incomplete. At the Leibniz Institute for Baltic Sea Research (Warnemünde, Germany), an updated time series has been compiled, filling in the gaps in observations and covering Major Baltic Inflows and various smaller inflow events of saline water from around 1890 to the present day. The updated time series is based on direct discharge data from the Darss Sill and no longer shows a clear change in the frequency or intensity of saline inflows. Instead, there is cyclical variation in the intensity of MBIs at approximately 30-year intervals.

== Effects on the state of the Baltic Sea and its ecosystem ==
Major Baltic inflows (MBIs) are the only natural phenomenon capable of oxygenating the deep saline waters of the Baltic Sea, making their occurrence crucial for the ecological state of the sea. The salinity and oxygen from MBIs significantly impact the Baltic Sea's ecosystems, including the reproductive conditions of marine fish species such as cod, the distribution of freshwater and marine species, and the overall biodiversity of the Baltic Sea.

The heavy saline water brought in by MBIs slowly advances along the seabed of the Baltic Proper at a pace of a few kilometers per day, displacing the deep water from one basin to another. Although some oxygen is transported from the North Sea to the Baltic Sea, only a small portion of the oxygen responsible for renewing the deep basins originates from the Baltic Sea entrance area. In the southwestern basins of the Baltic Sea (Arkona sea, Bornholm basin), there is already oxygen present in the water column, and the role of the saltwater pulse is to entrain and direct it towards the deep basins of the sea.

It has been observed that the oxygen supplied by saline inflows is consumed more rapidly in the Baltic Proper than before. In 1993, the oxygen replenishment was depleted in about 17 months, in 2003, it took approximately 13 months, and in 2015, it was exhausted in just six months.

The intense oxygen consumption in the Baltic Sea's seafloor is due to prolonged nutrient loading and the impacts of climate change. Although a single MBI can oxygenate both the deep water hydrogen sulfide and ammonia, multiple consecutive inflows would be required to raise the oxygen level to a satisfactory level. The so-called "oxygen debt" was estimated to be about 20 million tons in 2020. This is the amount of oxygen that should be transported to the Baltic Proper via saline inflows to raise its oxygen concentration to the 3 mL/L level observed after the MBI of 1993. With a single 200 km^{3} MBI, approximately 2 million tonnes of oxygen are transported.
