= GeoCenter Møns Klint =

Museum in Denmark

Coordinates: 54°57′59″N 12°33′03″E

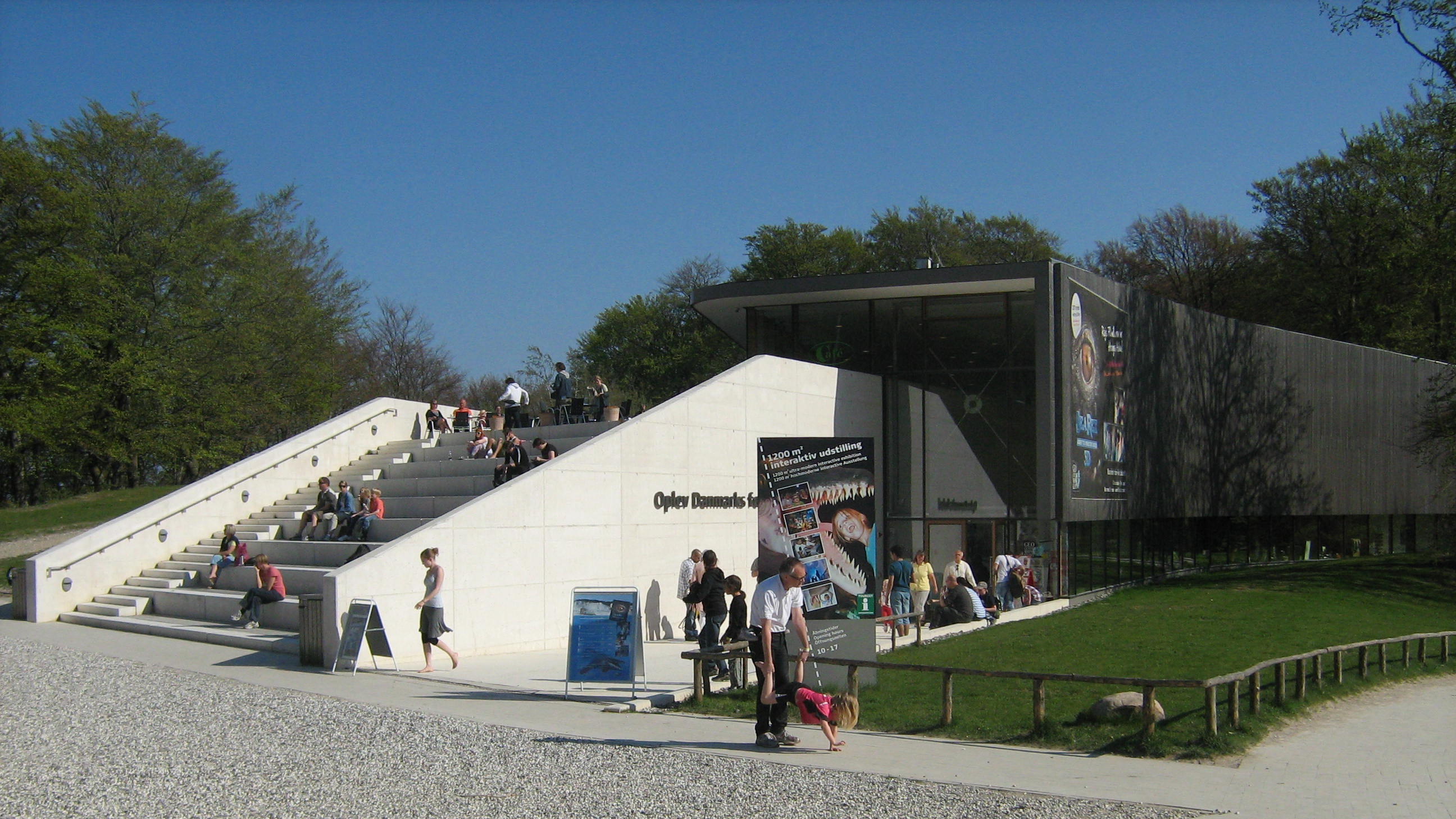
GeoCenter Møns Klint

GeoCenter Møns Klint is a geological and natural history museum on the island of Møn in southeastern Denmark. Located close to the top of the chalk cliffs known as Møns Klint, it was opened on 29 May 2007 by Queen Margrethe. The building was designed by PLH Architects, the winners of an international design competition.

== Design ==
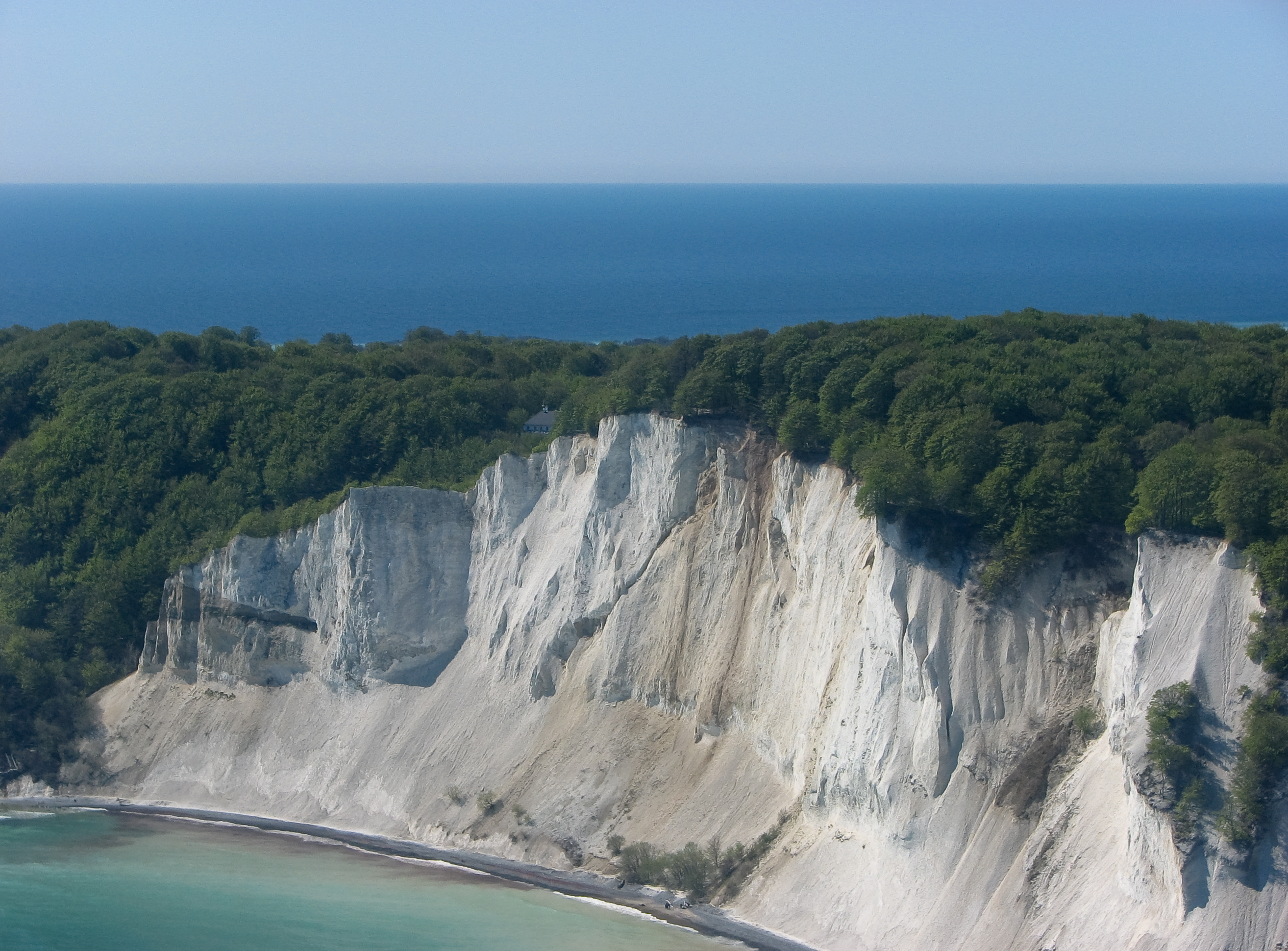
GeoCenter Møns Klint just visible at the top of the cliffs

Considered by the World Architecture Festival to be one of the world's most beautiful buildings, most of the structure is underground. The architects chose to safeguard nature by reducing the visible above-ground part of the building to a minimum. The large exhibition area, entirely underground, falls in line with the centre's objective which is to tell the story of what lies beneath Denmark. The curvature of the building was the result of a desire to preserve the trees lining the cliff. The centre's architect, Søren Mølbak, explains: "Because the cliffs are white and we wanted to follow nature, our choice of materials and colours is based on the natural environment. But we didn’t want to paint the walls white, so the building is made of white concrete, the floors are white cement plaster, the indoor walls are white rendered plasterboard, and the ceilings are white Mono acoustic spray-rendered ceilings." The white ceilings in the restaurant are free of directional lines, following the curvature of the building, and have randomly placed light fixtures. Those in the underground exhibition centre are black. The outer wall adjacent to the parking lot is lined with untreated planks of larch wood, blending into the surroundings.

== The exhibition ==
The exhibition traces Denmark's birth from prehistoric times 70 million years ago. Around the main exhibition hall, there are a number of large cave-like booths where artists express their views of the story. Visitors can walk through the gallery experiencing the different geological levels passing through the Cretaceous Period with sharks, sea urchins and the mosasaur, Tertiary Period when the chalky seabed was freed from the sea; and the Quaternary Period when glaciers subsided over Denmark.

In addition to interactive computer screens, the exhibition gallery has many attractions for children including treasure hunts, competitions and a 3D film.

== Gallery ==
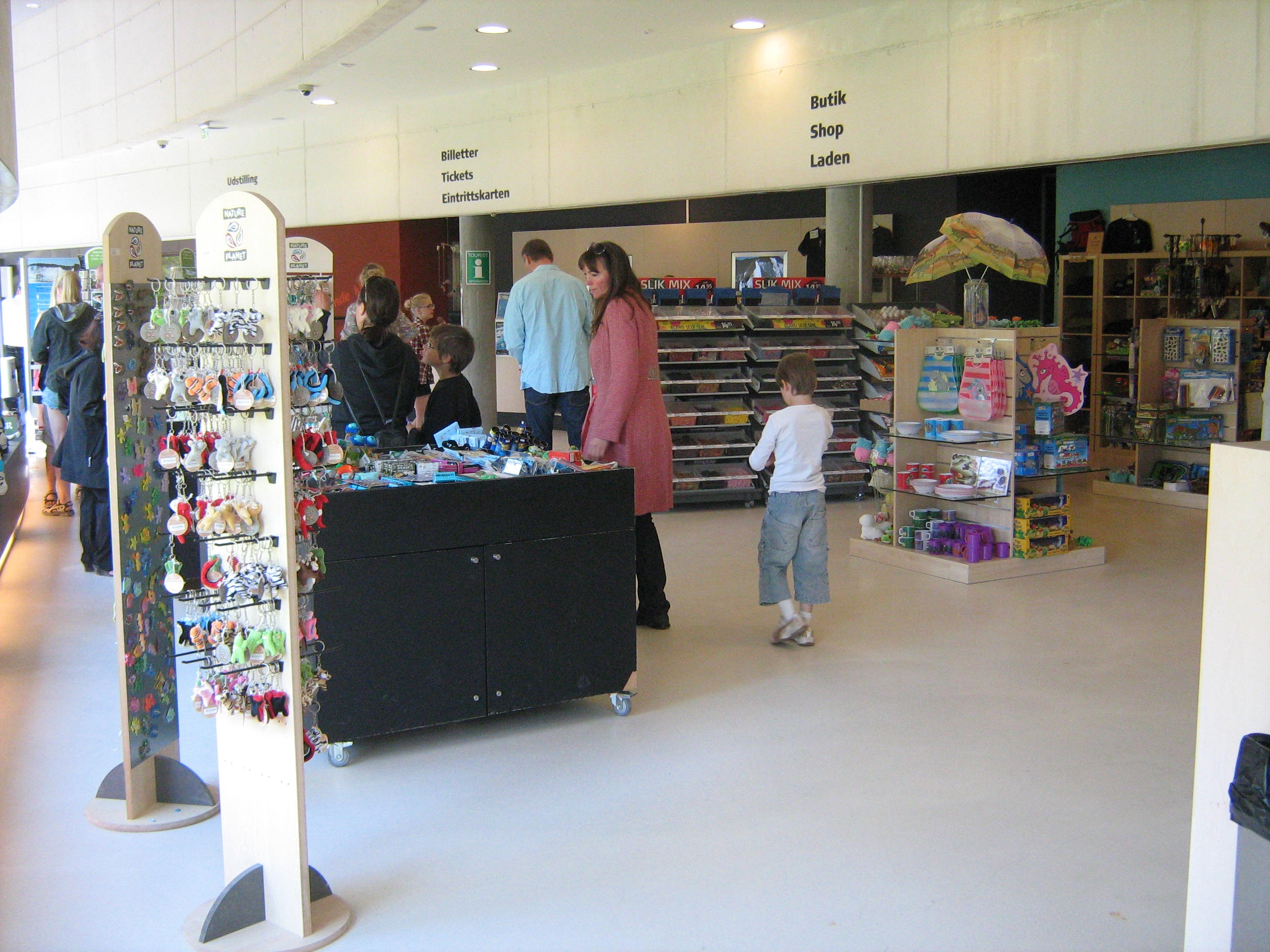
Ground floor with shop

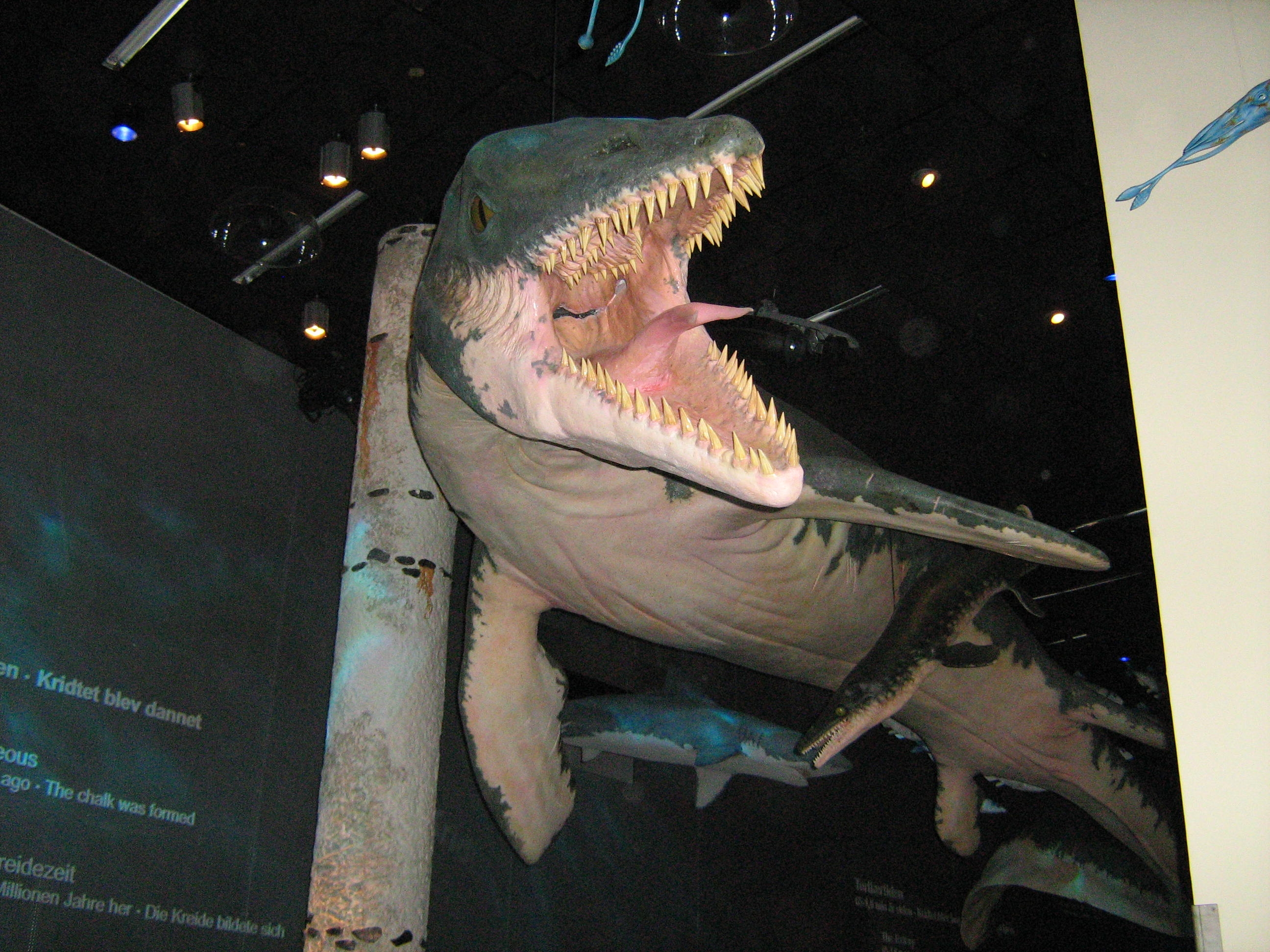
Mosasaur model suspended from exhibition gallery ceiling

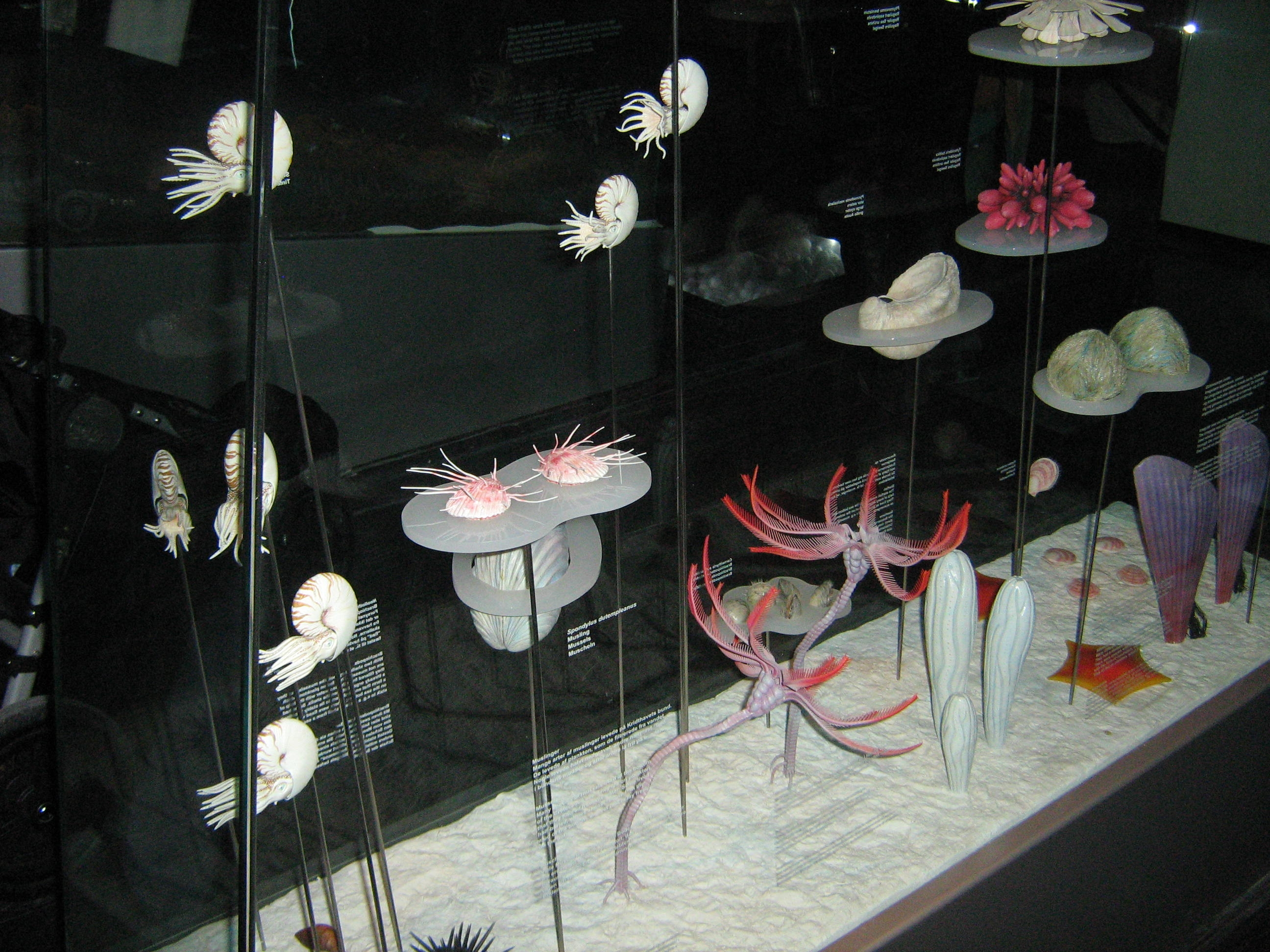
Show case in the underground exhibition centre

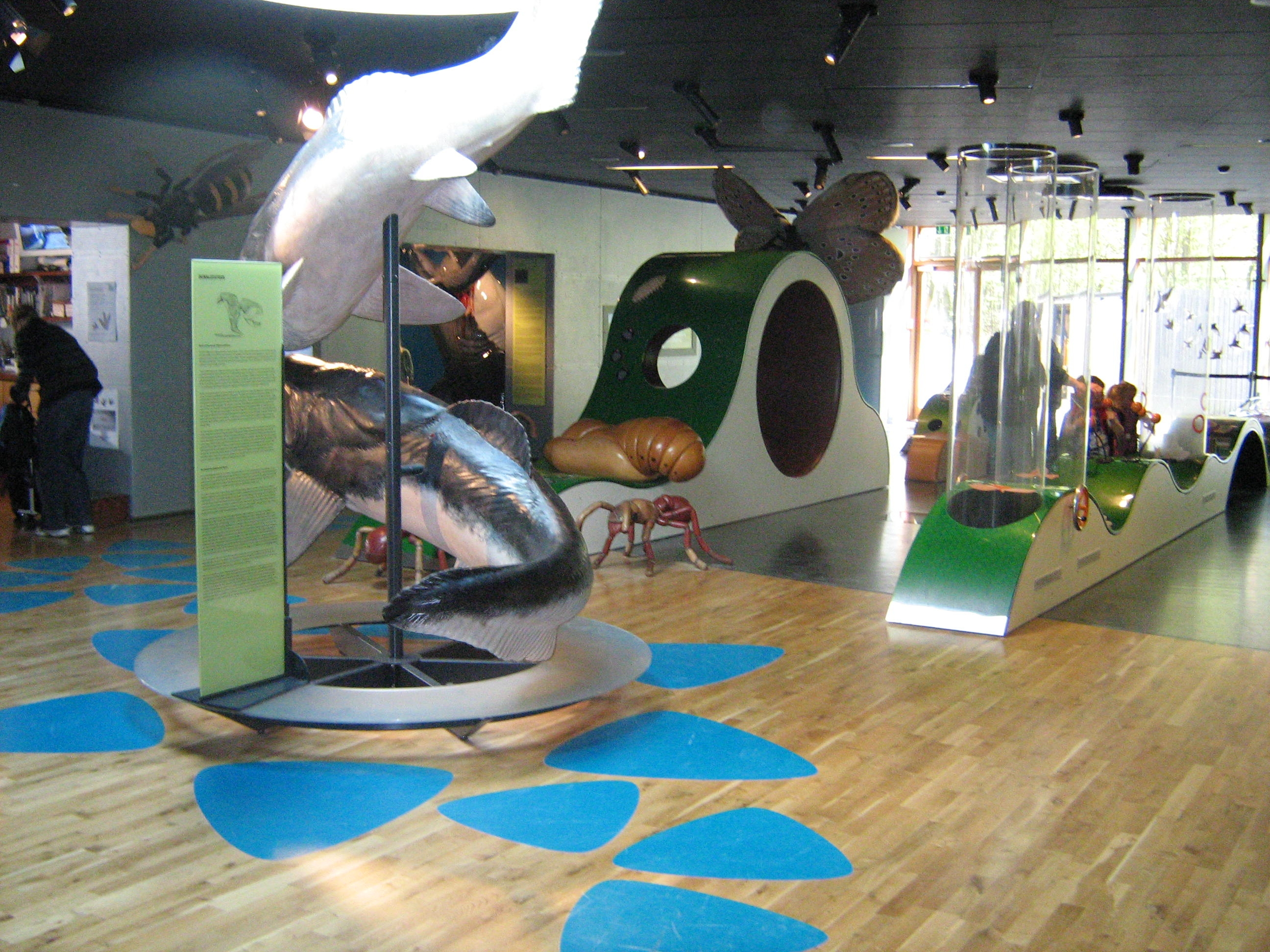
Upper floor section of the exhibition centre

== See also ==
- Skagen Odde Nature Centre
