= Fornæs Lighthouse =

Fornæs Lighthouse, Denmark
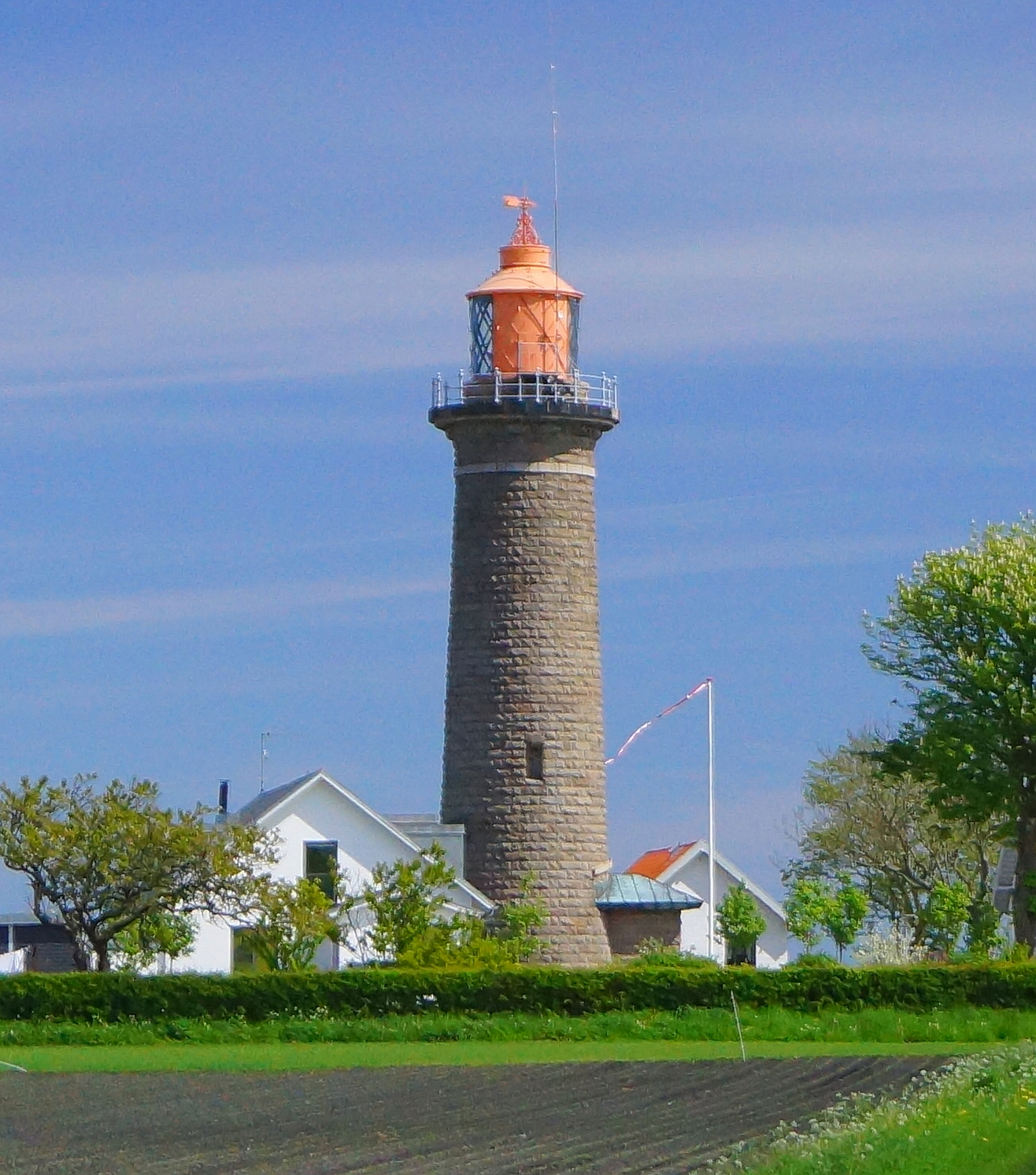
- Location: Djursland, Denmark
- Coordinates: 56.443421°N 10.957266°E

Tower
- Constructed: 1839
- Foundation: granite
- Construction: granite tower
- Height: 27 metres (89 ft)
- Shape: cylindrical tower with balcony and lantern
- Markings: unpainted tower and red lantern

Light
- First lit: 1892 (current)
- Focal height: 32 metres (105 ft)
- Characteristic: Fi W 20 s.
- Denmark no.: DFL-1870

Fornæs Lighthouse in Denmark is located on the eastern tip of the Danish peninsula, Djursland by the sea, Kattegat between Denmark and Sweden, 6 kilometers north of the town Grenaa.

The lighthouse was built in 1839 based on drawings by Georg Holgreen. The tower is integrated with the lighthouse keepers house. The lighthouse is supplied with rotating mirrors. In 1892 the current lighthouse tower was built from granite. In 1902 an acetylene based lamp was installed. In 1924 it was electrified based on British lighthouse technology.

== Description ==
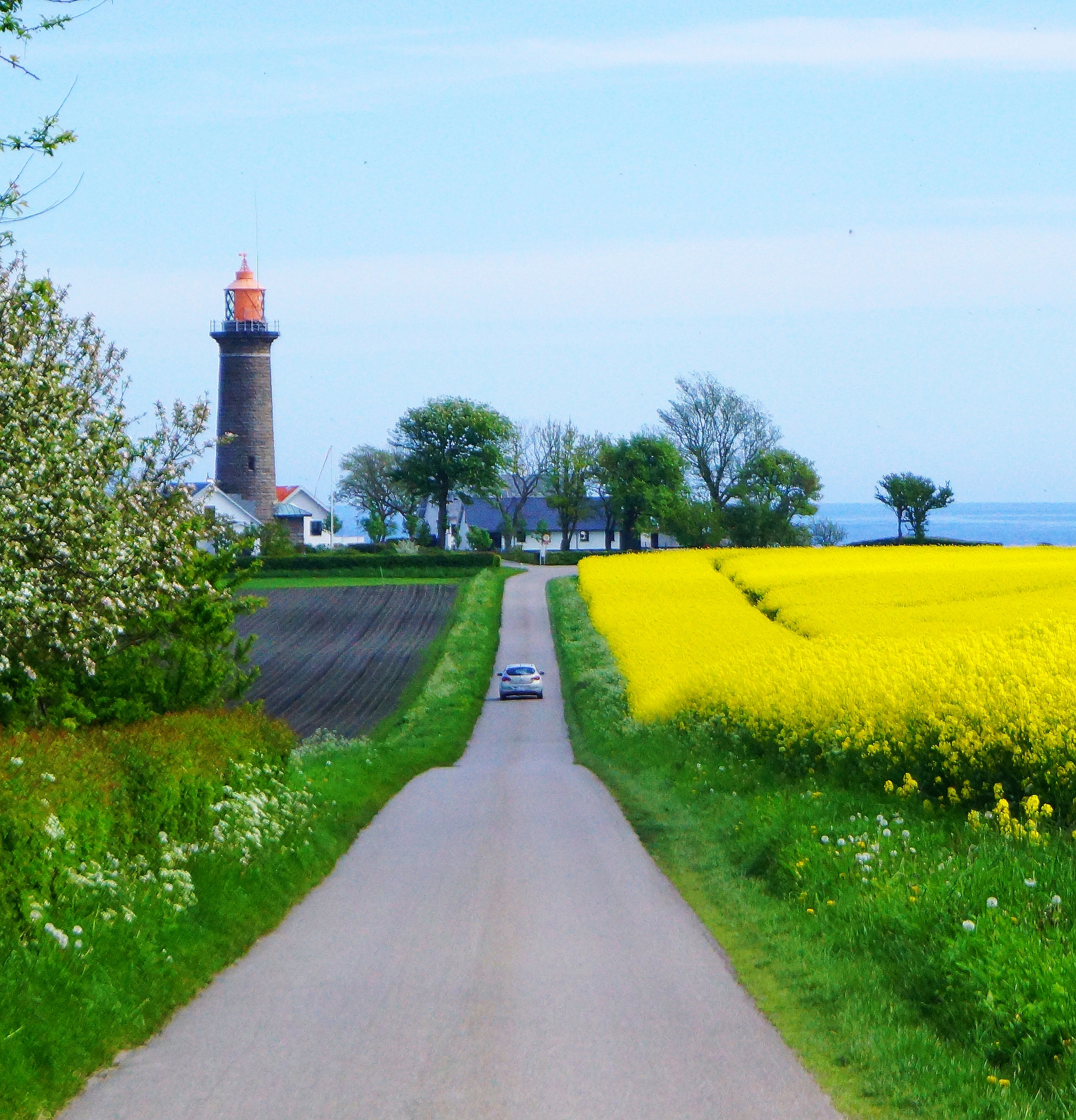
The road to Fornæs Lighthouse north of Grenaa

The tower is based on a 3 meter deep and 8.8 meter wide concrete foundation resting on solid lime underground. The 22 meter granite tower is built on a 0.5 meter granite base. The stairs leading up the tower has 84 granite steps, with one end integrated in the outer granite wall of the tower. The woodwork in the tower is made from teak. The cylindrical lamp structure has a diameter of 3.7 meters, and a window height of 2.8 meters supported by 12 window bars made of iron.

In 1976-77 a 365 m^{2} 2-story control center was built next to the lighthouse. From here a number of automated lighthouses were controlled. On January 1, 2000, the control center was closed, and the automated functions where transferred to the Danish capital, Copenhagen.

There is a parking area by the lighthouse giving public access to the beach and coastal fields south and north of the lighthouse. Anglers and divers also visit the area. The lighthouse keepers house has been used as a vacation rental since 2011.

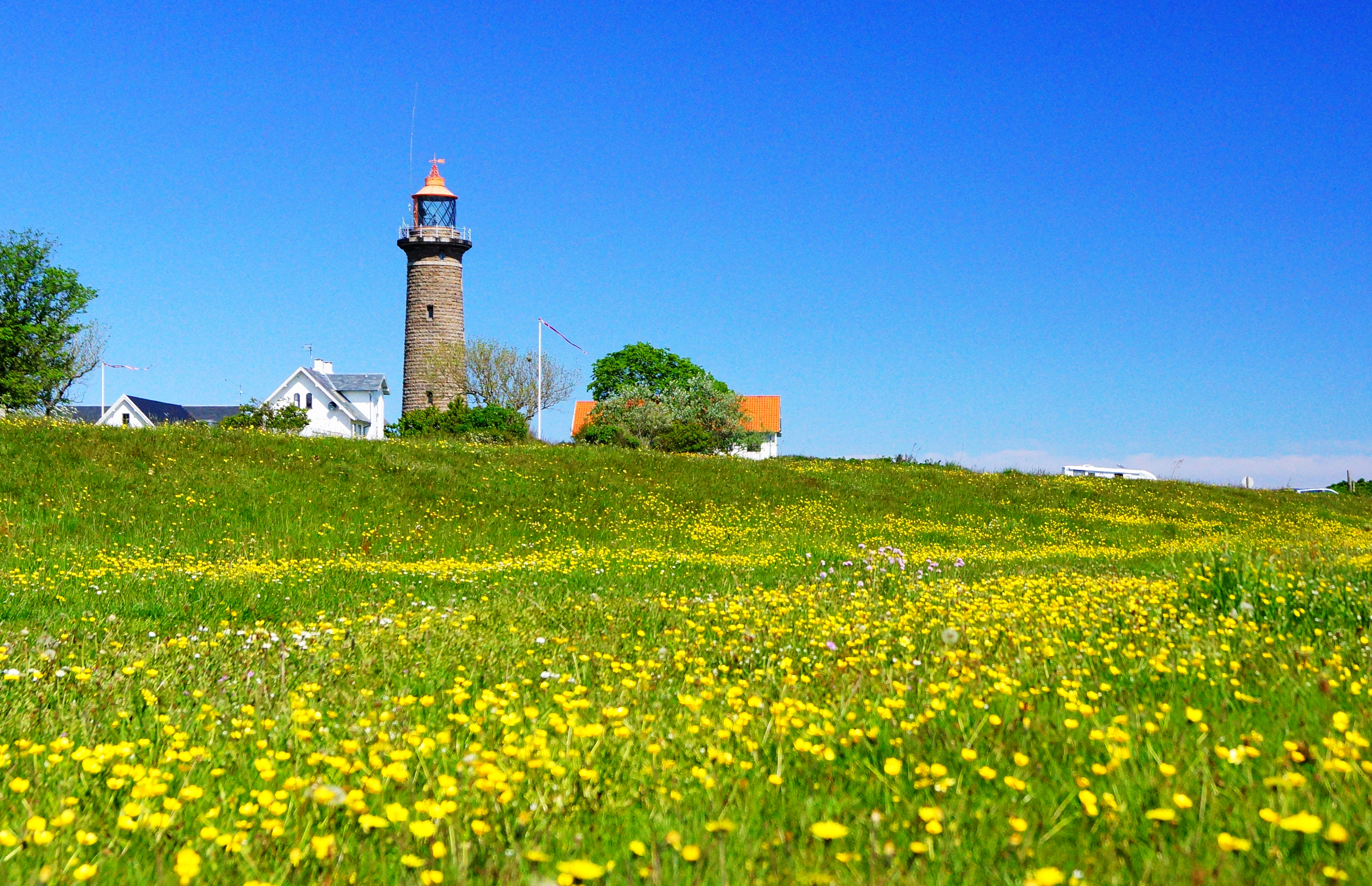
Flowery meadow down to the sea.

== See also ==
- List of lighthouses and lightvessels in Denmark
