= Rønne Lighthouse =

Rønne Lighthouse Rønne Bagfyr
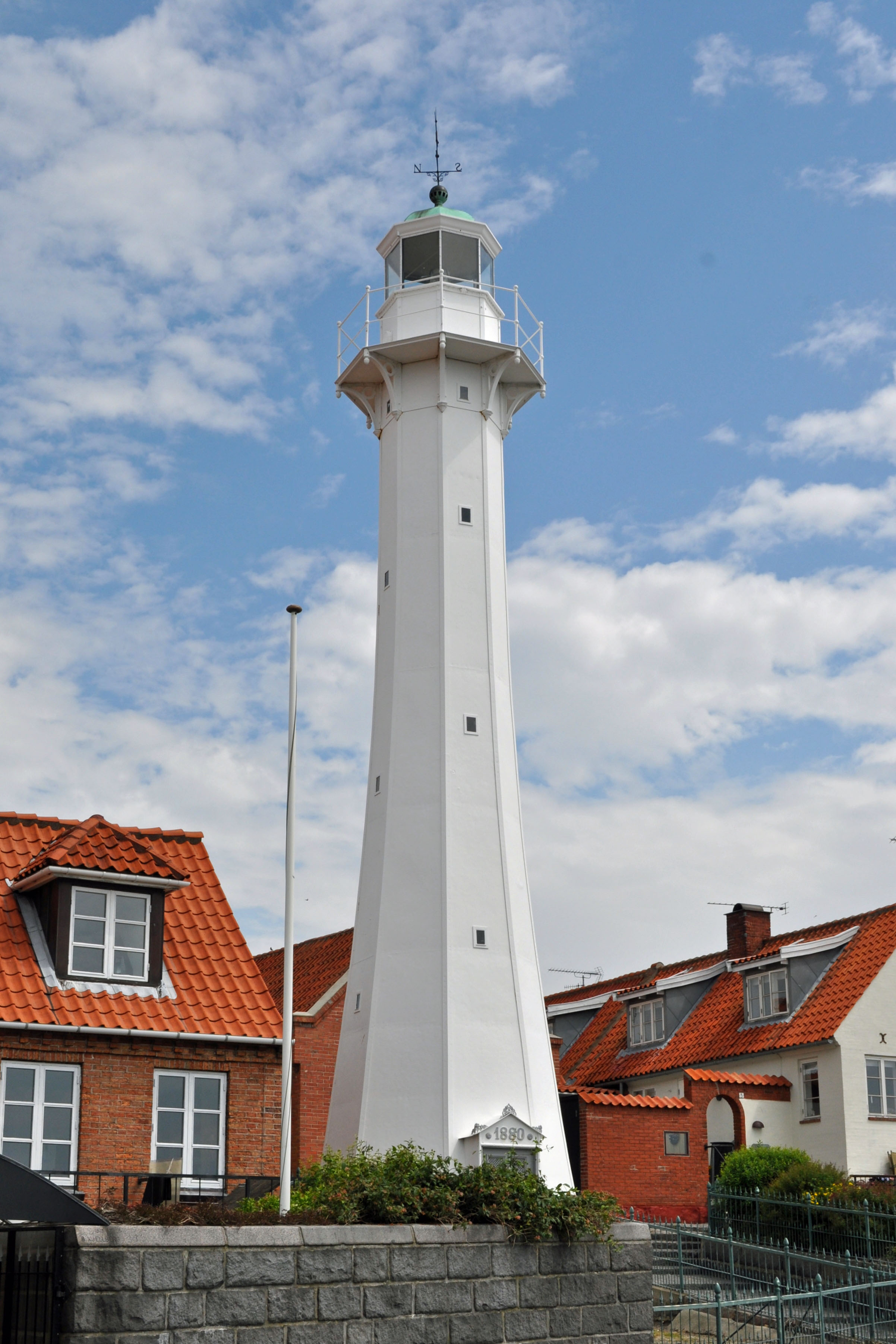
- Location: Rønne, Denmark
- Coordinates: 55.099510°N 14.696037°E

Tower
- Constructed: 1846 (first)
- Construction: cast iron tower (second)
- Height: 18 metres (59 ft) (second)
- Shape: tapered octagonal tower with balcony and lantern (second)
- Markings: white tower, green lantern dome (second)

Light
- First lit: 1880 (second)
- Deactivated: 1989

Rønne Lighthouse (Danish: Rønne Bagfyr) is located close to the waterfront in Rønne on the Danish island of Bornholm.

== History and description ==
The lighthouse was built by the Bornholm firm H. Wichmann & Co. in 1880, replacing the simple light which had stood on the site. It was brought into service on 27 September 1880, initially with a green light which was soon changed to red. The structure consists of a tapered, white-painted octagonal tower in cast iron with a lantern and gallery. The lantern dome is painted green. The lighthouse was restored and repainted in 2000. It stands between houses slightly back from the harbour waterfront. The overall height is 18 metres (59 ft), the cast-iron tower having a height of 12 metres (39 ft). The lighthouse was taken out of commission in 1989.

== See also ==
- List of lighthouses and lightvessels in Denmark
