= Svaneke Lighthouse =

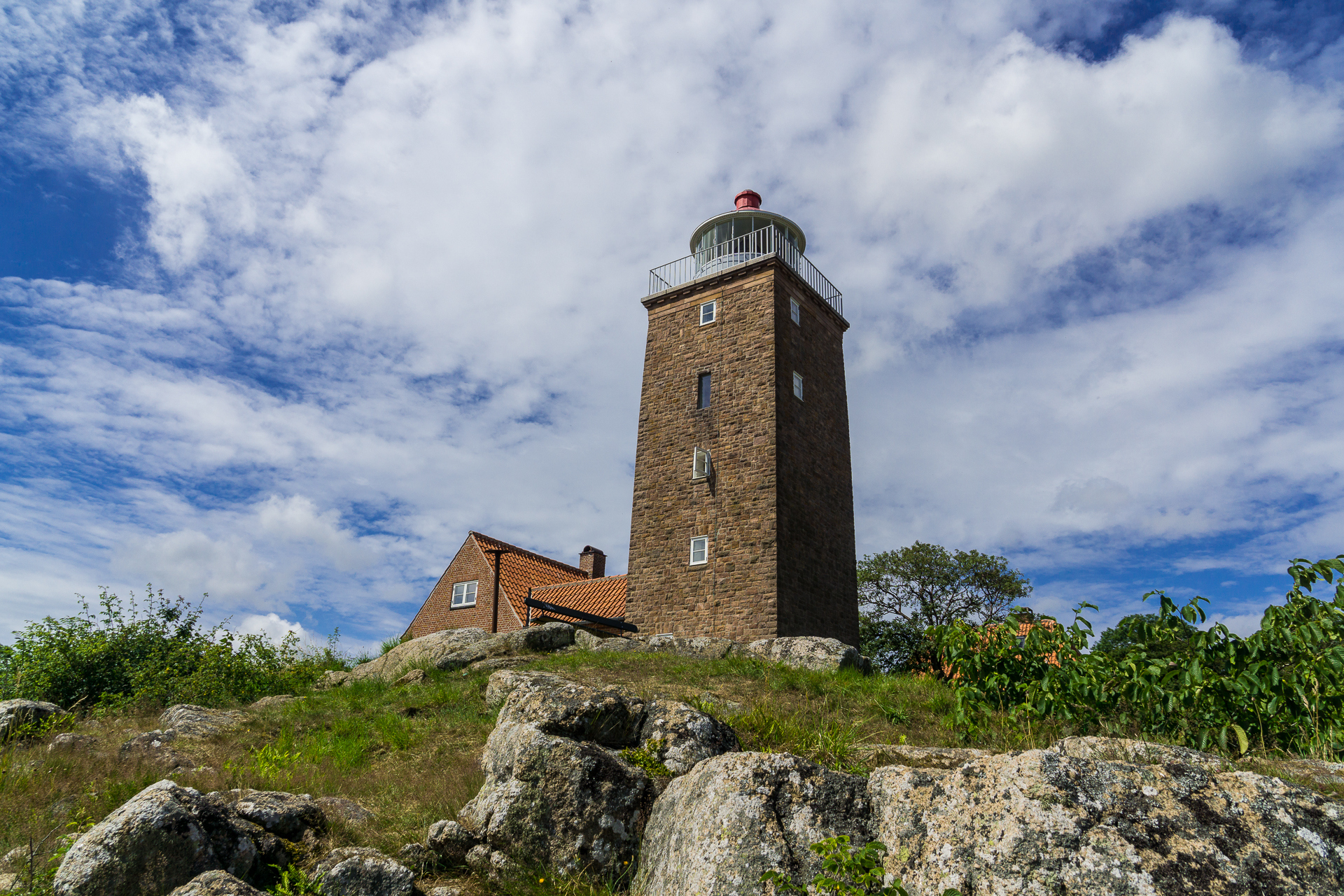
- Svaneke Lighthouse
- Location: Svaneke, Bornholm; Denmark
- Coordinates: 55.131644°N 15.152759°E

Tower
- Constructed: 1920
- Construction: stone tower
- Height: 18 metres (59 ft)
- Shape: square tower with balcony and lantern
- Markings: unpainted tower, white lantern, red roof lantern

Light
- Deactivated: 2010
- Focal height: 20 m (66 ft)
- Range: 19 nmi (35 km; 22 mi)
- Denmark no.: DFL-6085

Svaneke Lighthouse (Danish: Svaneke Fyr) is located southeast of Svaneke harbour on the Danish island of Bornholm. The overall height of the tower is 18 metres (59 ft).

== History and description ==
In March 1914, as a result of wind and fog, the Polish schooner Louise & Helene went aground at Hullenakke off the coast of Svaneke. As Poland did not exist as an independent state at that time the ship should properly have been identified as coming from the German Empire, the country that controlled the Baltic coast of the region until after the First World War and the creation of Poland. The ship was broken up on the rocks and its crew of three all drowned. As a result, the city council provided a plot of land for a lighthouse on Hullenakke. The architect Otto Bertlesen was invited to design the building which was completed in 1919. The base of the rather unusual square-shaped building is in Nexø granite while the tower itself is built of sandstone, 15 metres (49 ft) in height. In January 1920, a temporary light was placed on the platform and in August 1920 the final fixtures were added and the lighthouse came into full operation. As the lighthouse was also to provide fog warnings, a foghorn was installed which was operated by compressed air from an engine in the machine house. Living quarters for the lighthouse keeper and his family were also constructed on the site. In 2010, the lighthouse was taken out of commission and sold into private ownership the following year after heritage protection had been denied.

== Location ==
The lighthouse is situated on Sandkås Odde to the east of the fishing port of Svaneke close to a little inlet known as Hullehavn with excellent swimming.

== See also ==
- List of lighthouses and lightvessels in Denmark
