= Hammer Odde Lighthouse =

Lighthouse on Bornholm island, Denmark

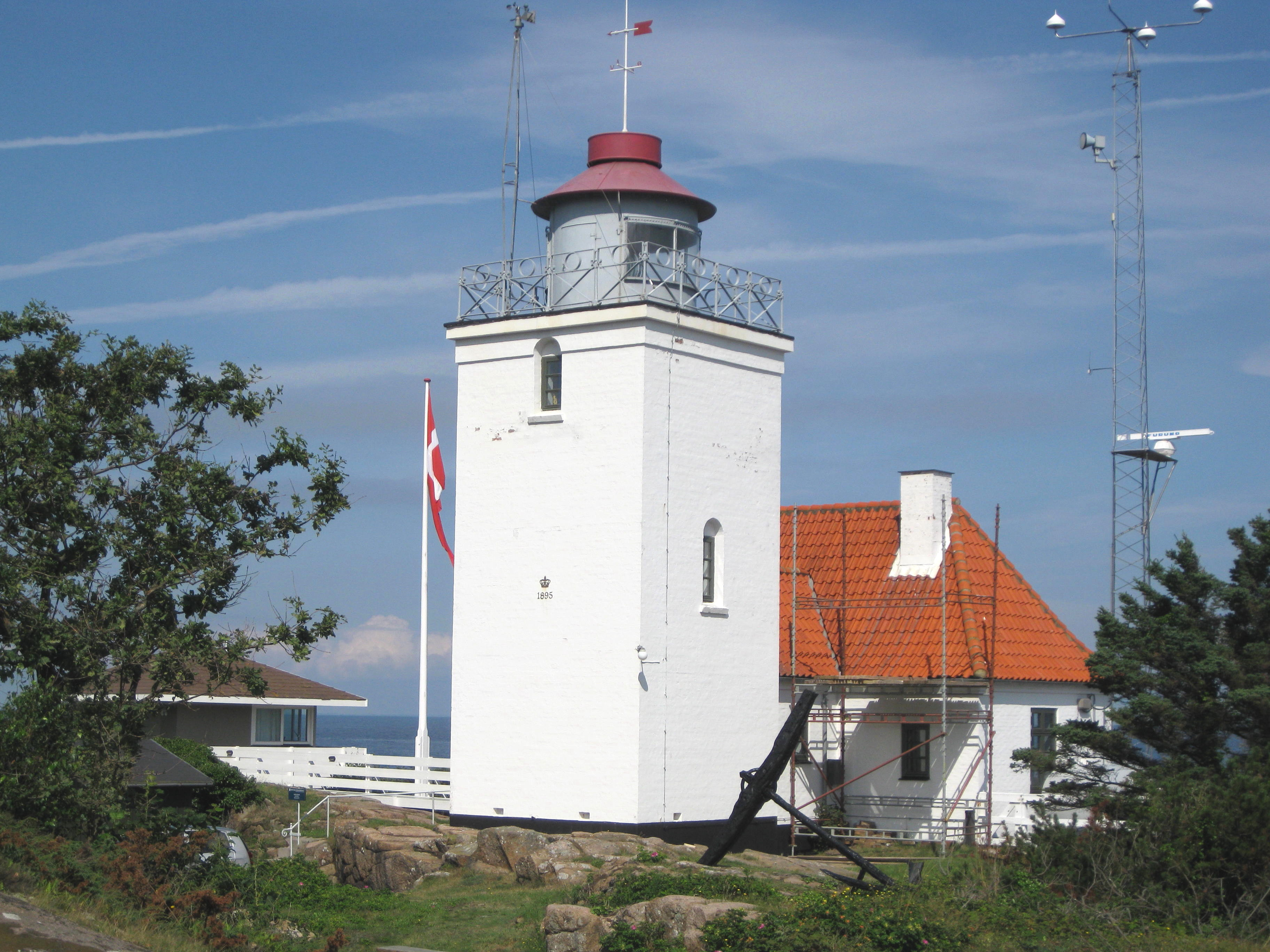
- Hammer Odde Lighthouse
- Location: Hammeren, Bornholm, Denmark
- Coordinates: 55°17′53.7″N 14°46′25.8″E

Tower
- Constructed: 1895
- Construction: masonry
- Height: 12 feet (3.7 m)
- Shape: square tower with balcony and lantern
- Markings: white tower and red lantern roof

Light
- Focal height: 21 feet (6.4 m)
- Intensity: 11,009 candela
- Range: 17 nmi (31 km; 20 mi)
- Characteristic: FI (2) W 10s.
- Denmark no.: DFL-6010

Hammer Odde Lighthouse (Danish: Hammer Odde Fyr) is located on the northernmost point of Hammeren, just outside Sandvig on the Danish island of Bornholm. A sand and gravel ocean bank, named David Bank, is situated 5.25 miles (8.45 km) from the lighthouse.

== History and description ==
Hammer Odde Lighthouse was built in 1885 to complement the nearby Hammeren Lighthouse which, owing to its high altitude 91 metres (299 ft), could not always be seen from the sea in foggy weather. The whitewashed square-shaped tower has a height of just 12 metres (39 ft). From the start, the lighthouse was equipped with a rotating lens, giving two short blinks every 10 seconds. In 1939, radio equipment was installed, making it one of the most modern facilities of its kind.

== See also ==
- List of lighthouses and lightvessels in Denmark
