= Skagen Lighthouse =

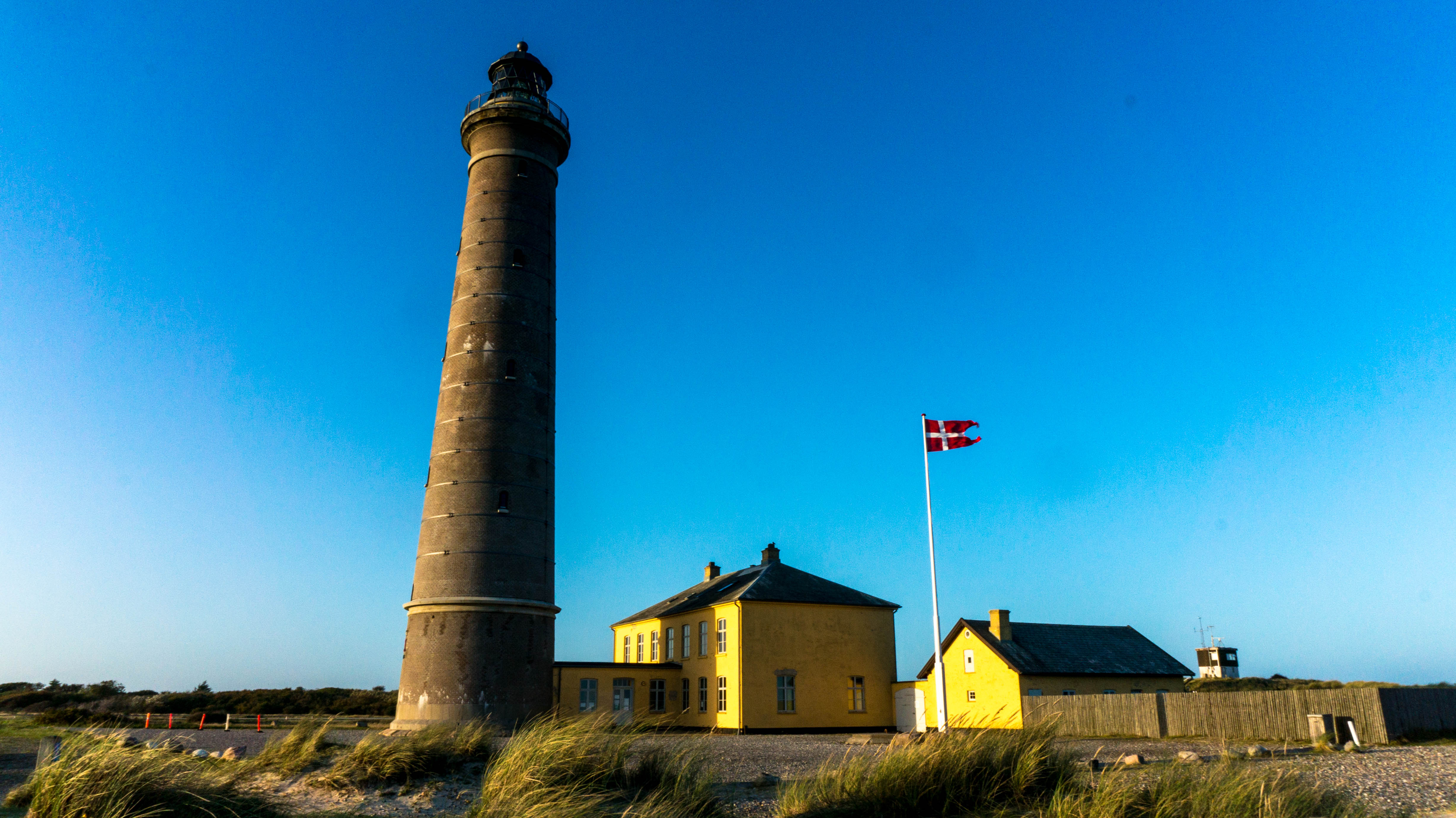
- Skagen Lighthouse
- Location: Grenen, Frederikshavn Municipality, Denmark
- Coordinates: 57.735550°N 10.630144°E

Tower
- Constructed: 1747 (first)
- Construction: brick tower
- Height: 46 m (151 ft)
- Shape: tapered cylindrical tower with balcony and lantern
- Markings: unpainted tower, grey metallic lantern
- Heritage: monument on Kulturstyrelsen register
- Racon: G

Light
- First lit: 1858 (current)
- Focal height: 44 m (144 ft)
- Range: 20 nmi (37 km)
- Characteristic: Fl W 4s
- Denmark no.: DFL-0330

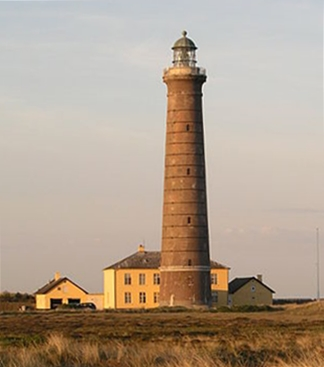
Skagen fyr

Skagen Lighthouse (Danish: Skagen Fyr), also known as Skagen's Grey Lighthouse (Det Grå Fyr), is an active lighthouse four kilometres (2 1/2 miles) northeast of Skagen in the far north of Jutland, Denmark. Designed by architect Niels Sigfred Nebelong, it was brought into operation on 1 November 1858.

== Description ==
Skagen's first lighthouse, the White Lighthouse (Det Hvide Fyr), designed by Philip de Lange and completed in 1747, was the first lighthouse in Denmark to be built in brick. The Skagen Lighthouse which replaced it consists of an unpainted round brick tower with a lantern and gallery, reaching a height of 46 m (151 ft). The two-storey keeper's house to which it is attached is painted bright yellow. When it was built it was more or less at the centre of the Skagen Odde peninsula, but as a result of coastal erosion, it is now very near the Kattegat coast to the southeast.

The lighthouse has a two-tonne rotating lens resting on mercury. Originally there was a five-wicked paraffin lamp which was successively replaced with a 1000-watt then a 1500-watt electric lamp. Today there is a 400-watt sodium lamp which every four seconds can be seen up to 37 kilometres (20 nautical miles) away.

Until 1952, Skagen Lighthouse was the country's tallest. Dueodde Lighthouse on Bornholm is now just one meter higher.

In 2017, the lighthouse was launched as a new international bird center Skagen Grey Lighthouse - Center for Migratory birds. The center consists of an interactive exhibition and a working bird observatory -Skagen Bird Observatory. Skagen and the Grenen area is known for its wide range of migrating birds, so the lighthouse is a perfect place for birdwatching.

== Open to visitors ==
The lighthouse is open to visitors from April to October. Daily opening hours are 10:00 to 16:00 from April to mid-June and from September to October. In the high season from mid-June until the end of August the opening hours are from 10:00 to 17:00.

== See also ==
- List of lighthouses and lightvessels in Denmark

== Literature ==
- Lønstrup, Jørn; Nielsen, Ingrid; Egnsmuseum, Skagen By- og (1997). Skagen - fyr og flamme: Det hvide Fyr og dets forgængere (in Danish). Skagen By- og Egnsmuseum. ISBN 978-87-88940-10-7.
