= Grenen =

Northernmost point of Denmark

Coordinates: 57°44′38″N 10°38′51″E

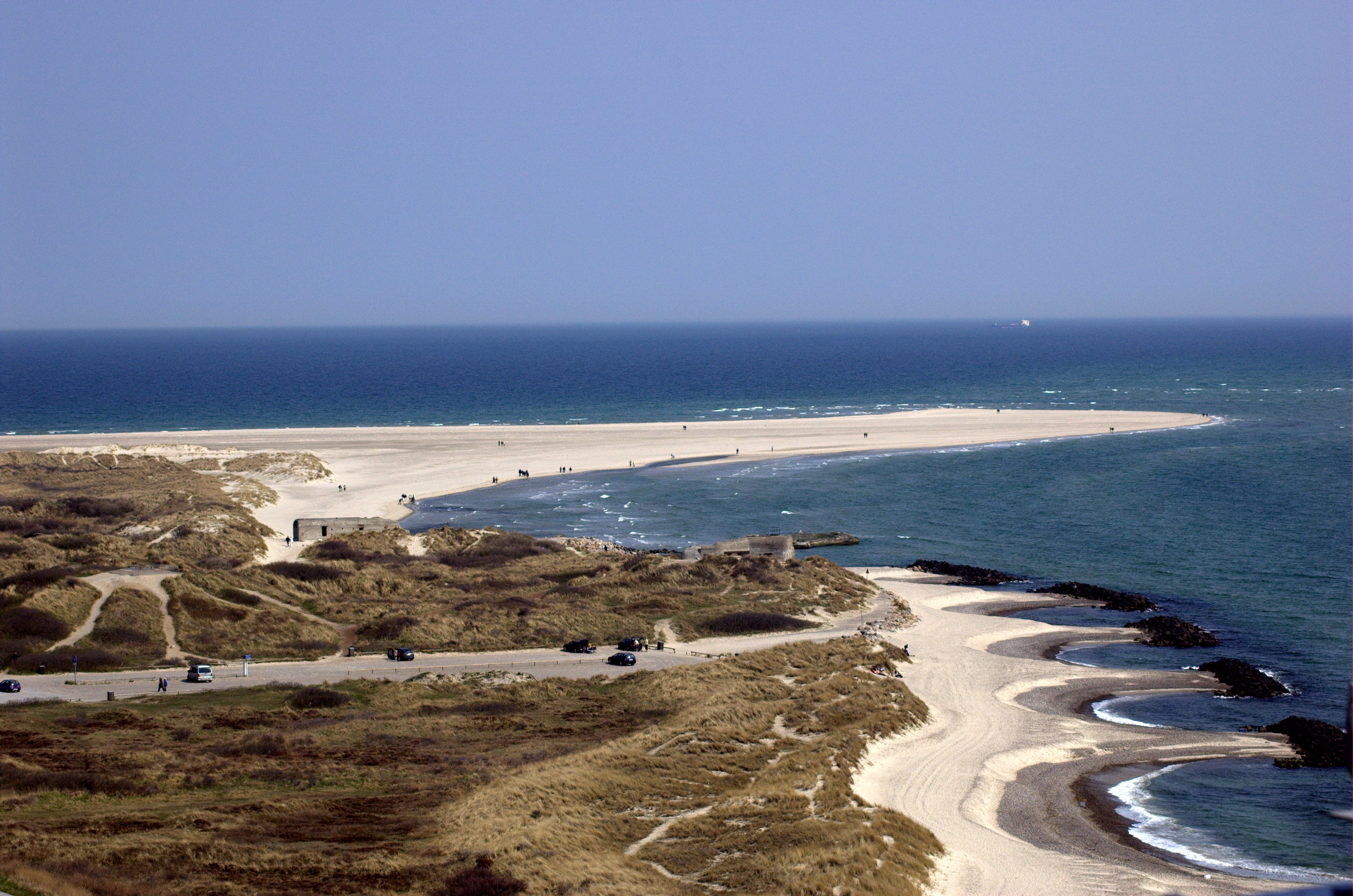
Grenen beach, 2006

Grenen is a long sandbar spit at Skagen Odde (the headland of Jutland), northeast of the town of Skagen.

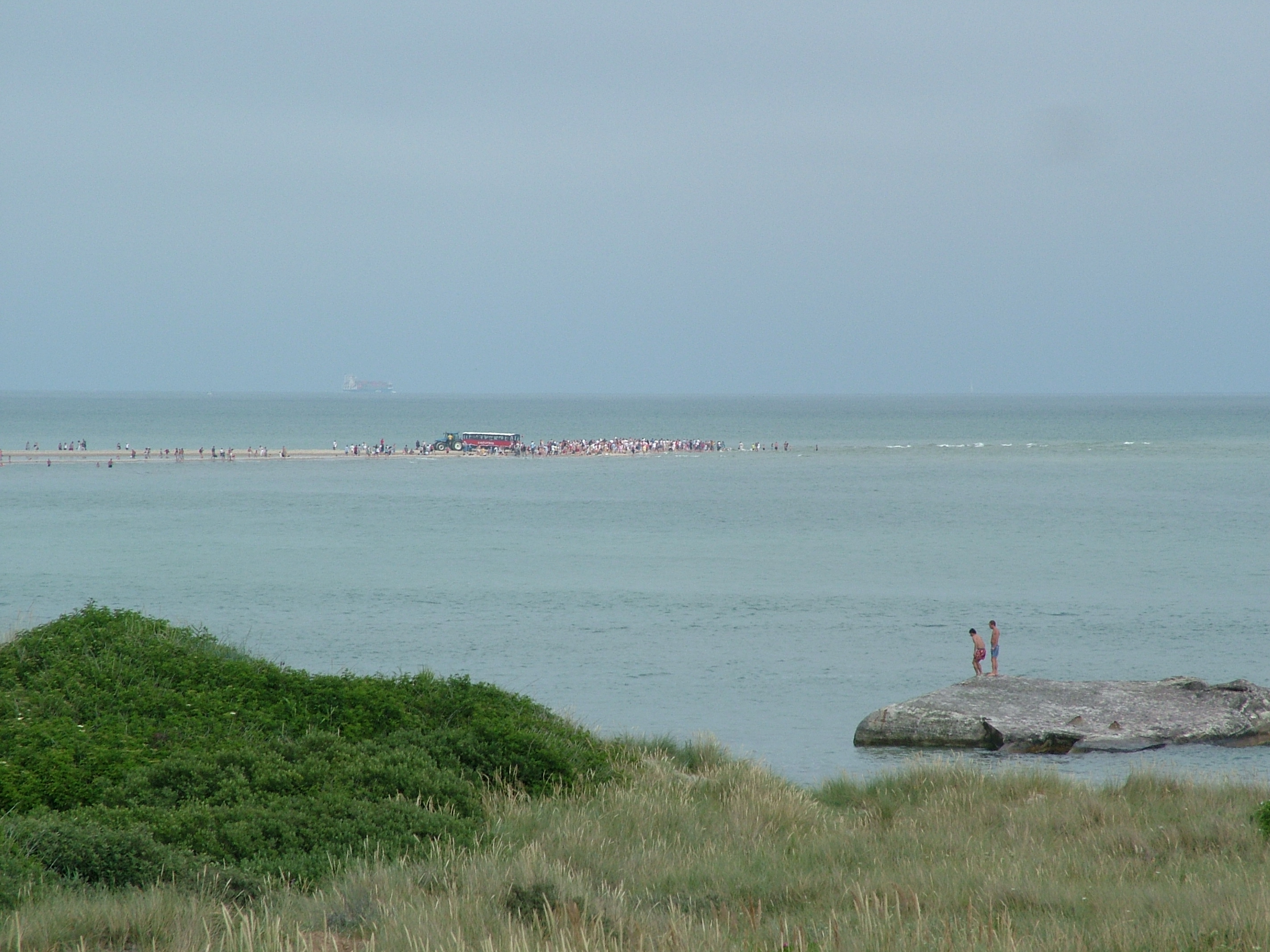
Grenen seen from the south.

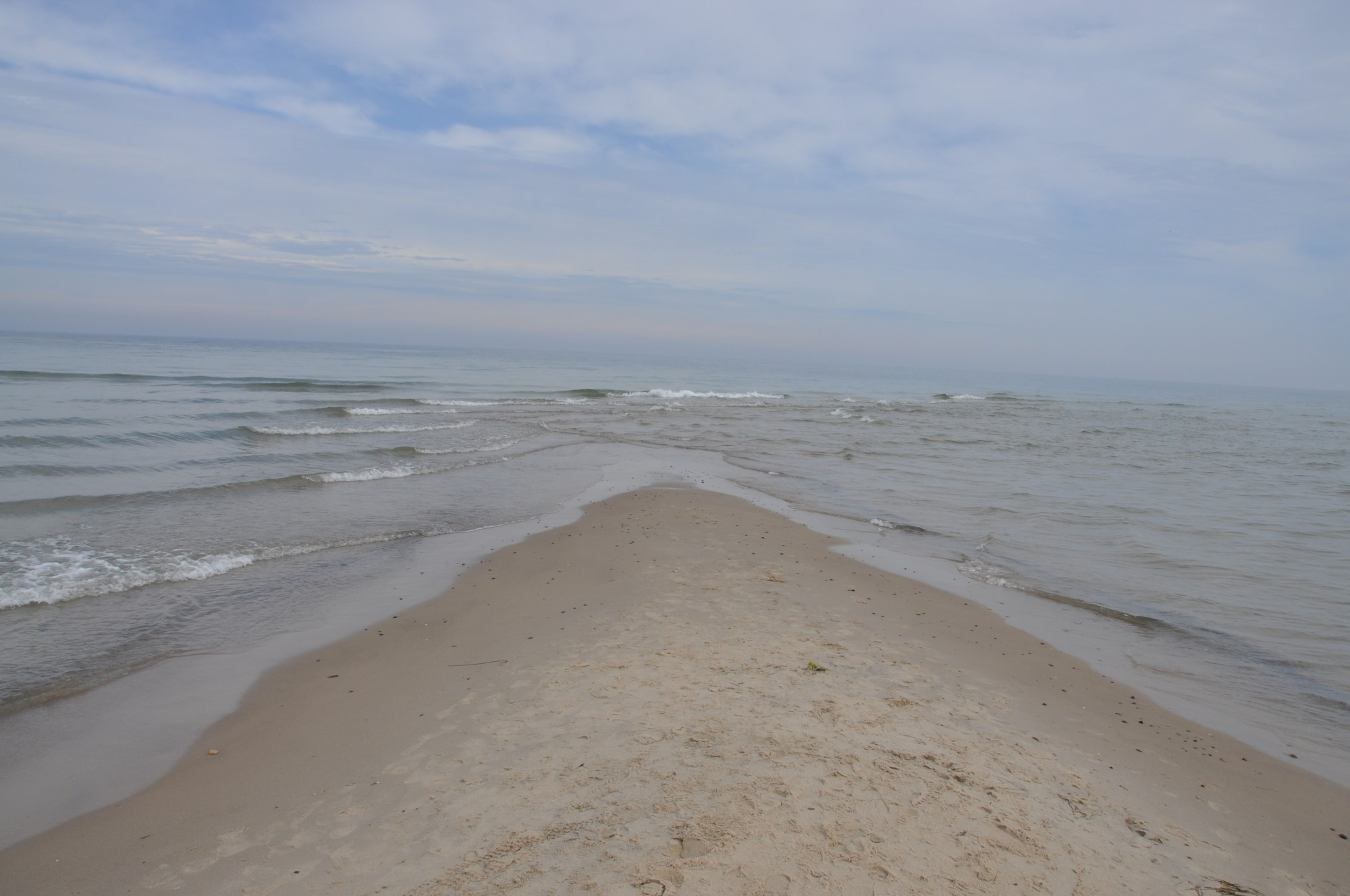
The tip of Grenen, with the Skagerrak on the left and Kattegat on the right

== Overview ==
Grenen (The Branch) was named for its shape like a tree-branch, reaching out from the mainland. The beach of Grenen appears in many of the works of the Skagen Painters, a community that gathered there every summer between 1875 and the end of the 19th century. The area is also home to the Skagen Odde Nature Centre, designed by Jørn Utzon.

Near the tip of the spit are two small museums: Skagen Bunker Museum and Grenens Kunstmuseum. Danish national road 40 terminates at Grenen, and it is one of the most popular tourist destinations in the country, with approximately 2 million visitors each year.

== Nature ==
Grenen marks the junction between the strait of Skagerrak (part of the North Sea) and the Kattegat sea. The turbulent colliding waves have created a 4-km long curved sandbar above and below the waves stretching east. The reef is still active and has grown about 1 km northeast towards Sweden over the last century, resulting in a mean annual growth rate of about 10 m. Because of the very strong currents, swimming there can be fatal and is prohibited in the waters around Grenen.

The area surrounding Grenen is the place with the greatest number of observed bird species in all of Denmark. Birdwatchers regard it as the best spot in Northern Europe, for observing birds of prey during their spring migrations. Birds often gather here before crossing the seas to Bohuslän in Sweden. There are more migratory birds near Grenen when the wind is from the south-east. If the wind is from the south-west, many birds choose a route across Funen and Zealand instead. The annual Skagen Birding Festival has been celebrated here since 2005, attracting more than a thousand visitors and participants.

Grenen is also one of the best places in Denmark to observe sea mammals. Porpoises and common seals are very common here, and grey seals can be spotted here year round as well. As the area attracts many birdwatchers with binoculars, Grenen has also offered many whale sightings. The species most often reported are dolphins (especially white-beaked dolphins), northern minke whale and orcas. There have been isolated reports from Grenen of more exotic animals such as the walrus, the hooded seal and others.

Scientists view Grenen as a laboratory on both land formation and botany, as new land is continuously being formed and shaped here, soon to be colonized by pioneering flora.

== History ==
Sailors long feared Grenen, as many ships have run aground on the shallow reef through history. The first light signals were erected in 1561 on orders from King Frederik II after international pressure. It was not very effective and was not regularly attended, so from 1627 Skagen's Vippefyr, a coal- and wood-fired tipping lantern, replaced it until 1747, when Skagen's White Lighthouse was built. The 44-metre high Skagen's Grey Lighthouse has done the job since 1858, and in 1956 the 26-metre tall Skagen's West Lighthouse was added, making the heavy traffic in and out of Kattegat adequately safe.

== Geography ==
Grenen is commonly believed to be the northernmost point of Denmark proper. However, since Grenen greatly curves to the east, the true north point lies at Skagen Nordstrand.

== Sources ==
- Skagens Gren Naturturist Nordjylland. (in Danish)
