= Hammeren Lighthouse =

Hammeren Lighthouse Hammer fyr
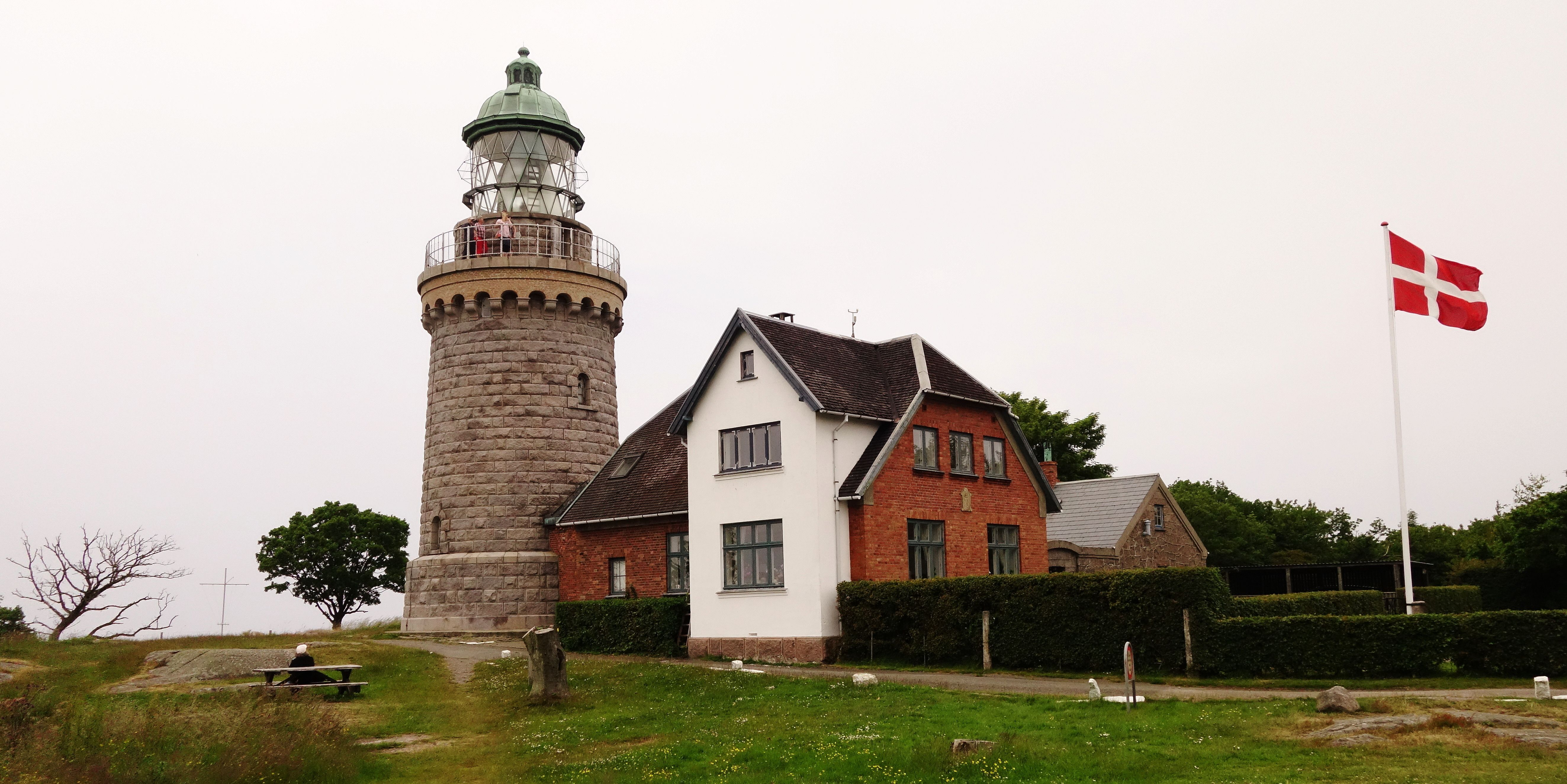
- Hammeren Lighthouse
- Location: Hammeren, Bornholm; Denmark
- Coordinates: 55.286902°N 14.759334°E

Tower
- Constructed: 1872
- Construction: granite tower
- Height: 21 metres (69 ft)
- Shape: cylindrical tower with balcony and lantern attached to 1-story keeper’s house
- Markings: unpainted tower, greenish lantern dome
- Operator: Hammerfyr

Light
- Deactivated: 1990
- Focal height: 91 metres (299 ft)
- Lens: 1st order Fresnel lens

Hammeren Lighthouse (Danish: Hammeren Fyr) is located on the Hammeren peninsula on the northwestern tip of the Danish island of Bornholm.

== History ==
An older, coal-fired lighthouse built in 1802 and modernized in 1837 was taken out of operation in 1872 when it was decided to build a new, taller replacement close to the very highest point on Hammeren, Stejlebjerg. Its height, however, proved to be a problem as it could not always be seen from the sea in foggy weather. It was therefore decided in 1895 to build a second lighthouse, Hammer Odde Lighthouse.

== The lighthouse ==
Inactive since 1990, it is situated on the heights of Stejlebjerg. Its lantern, 4.3 metres (14 ft) in diameter, is 85 metres (279 ft) above sea level. When operational, its fixed lamplight was visible at a distance of 37 kilometres (23 mi). The lighthouse is located on the northwestern tip of Bornholm, with GPS coordinates 55°17'N, 14°55'E, at the end of the Fyrvej about 2.5 kilometres (1.6 mi) west of Sandvig. It is a circular granite tower (built beside a 1-1/2 storied keeper's house in brick) and stands in a very scenic natural area (surrounded by small coniferous vegetation) with many old monuments. This lighthouse replaced the Stejlebjerg Lighthouse, established in 1802, which was closer to Hammerodde. Built in 1871, Hammeren Lighthouse was functional between 1872 and 1990, with electrification provided in 1947. The masonry tower is 21 metres (69 ft) in height but the total height of the lighthouse, including its beaming lantern dome (with a greenish metallic colour) and fixtures, is 91 metres (299 ft). This was considered too high to be seen in foggy weather. Visitors are permitted to enter the tower during the summer period. On a clear day, views extend to the Swedish coast.

== See also ==
- List of lighthouses and lightvessels in Denmark
