= Lightship Museum, Esbjerg =

Museum ship in Esbjerg in southern Denmark

Coordinates: 55°28′59″N 8°24′39″E

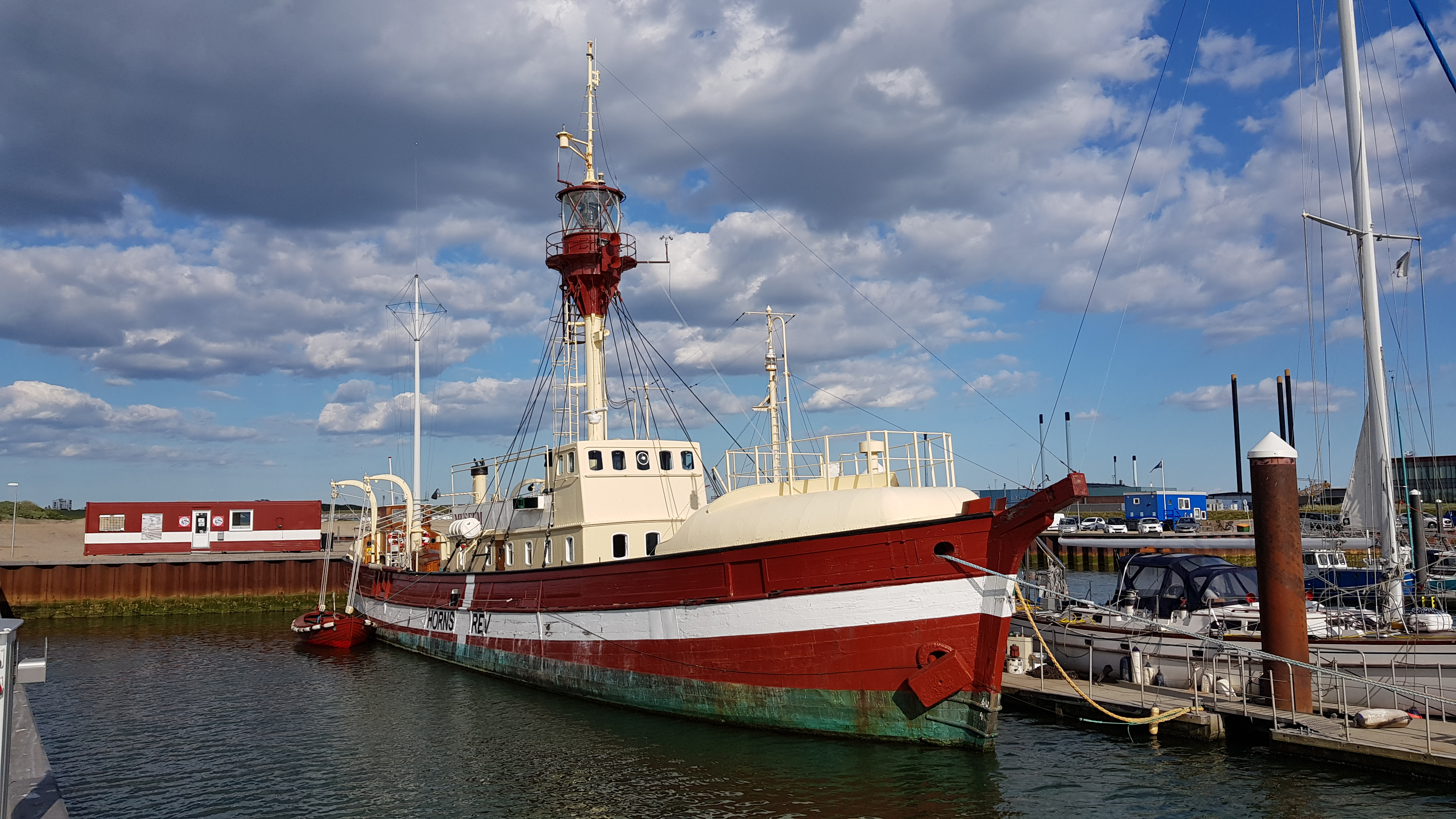
Horns Rev at Havneøen in the northernmost part of Esbjerg Harbour

The Lightship Museum (Danish: Museumsfyrskib) in the harbour of Esbjerg in southern Denmark consists of a private museum open to the public on board the Horns Rev lightship. Dating from 1912, the Horns Rev, also known as Motorfyrskibet Nr. I, is the world's oldest and best preserved motor lightship. It houses a highly regarded exhibition of life and work on board.

== History ==
The world's largest and best preserved wooden lightship, Motorfyrskibet Nr. I, was built at the Rasmus Møller shipyard in Fåborg. The contract was signed in June 1912 and the ship was delivered on schedule in August 1914. From the beginning it was intended to serve shipping from the Port of Esbjerg. Apart from short periods when it was stationed elsewhere or undergoing maintenance, it spent most of its working life off Esbjerg, first at Vyl Station or at Horns Rev Station where it last served in 1980. Both these positions lie west of Esbjerg in the North Sea. Its final period of service was off the island of Møn (at Møn SE Station) from 1981 to 1988. In 1989, on the recommendation of the Ministry of Culture, it was acquired by Fonden til bevarelse af Motorfyrskib Nr.1 (Foundation for the preservation of Motor Light Vessel No. 1). It opened as a museum in July 1990.

The positions the lightship served at Horns Rev and Vyl, which indicate one of the most dangerous reefs in Danish waters, have now been replaced by light buoys.

== Motorfyrskib No. I ==
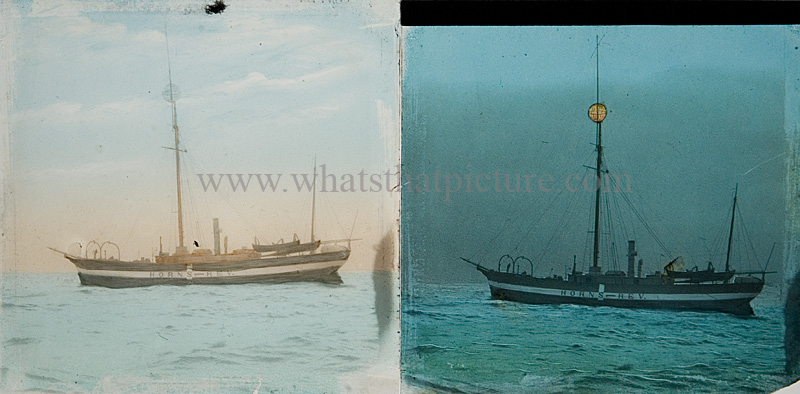

Built of oak, the ship has a length of 33.582 m (110.18 ft), a breadth of 6.826 m (22.40 ft) and a draught of 3.478 m (11.41 ft). Its displacement is 342 tonnes. It originally had a 125-horsepower, two-stroke engine which was later replaced with a three-cylinder, 180-horsepower diesel engine. Initially, the light could be hoisted up and down the mast and could be prepared for use on deck but it was later permanently secured at the top of the mast. was displayed amidships from a round lantern. The ship's hull is painted with the colours of the Danish flag: red with a white horizontal band and a vertical white stripe.

== Museum ==
Located at Esbjerg's original harbour ("Dokhavnen"), to where it moved from the recreational area "Havneøen" in September 2025 to become more accessibly from the city center, the museum ship is open to visitors from May to September, Monday, Tuesday & Thursdays, 9 am to 12 noon. It features an exhibition illustrating in detail the role and importance of Denmark's lightships.

== See also ==
- Lightvessel Gedser Rev
- Horns Rev
