= Skagen Odde Nature Centre =

Coordinates: 57°44′24″N 10°35′44″E

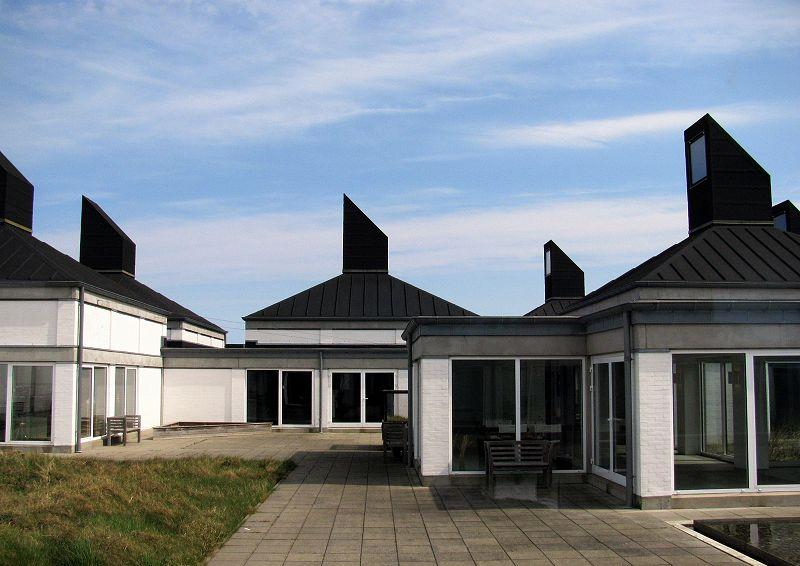
Skagen Odde Nature Centre

The Skagen Odde Nature Centre (Danish: Skagen Odde Naturcenter), on the northern tip of Denmark's Jutland, is a museum devoted to the effects of sand, water, wind and light. It was designed in 1989 by Jørn Utzon, the celebrated architect behind the Sydney Opera House. Under the leadership of his son Jan, the centre was completed in 2000.

== Location ==
The centre is located on Bøjlevejen, some three kilometres north-east of the centre of Skagen, itself 40 km north of Frederikshavn. Apart from the nearby radar station, it is the northernmost building in the area, not far from the point where the Kattegat and the Skagerrak meet. The surrounding area known as Grenen, rich in bird life, offers interesting walks along its sandy beaches.

== Architecture ==
As the centre is dedicated to the natural elements which were so fundamental to Utzon's work, it is hardly surprising that he was invited to be its architect. Utzon's idea was that the centre should grow out of nature as a response to the soul, reflecting silence, tranquillity and contemplation, so difficult to find in today's world.

The "Desert Fortress", as it has been called, is enclosed by a brick wall, four metres high, which protects the 4,000 square metre activity area from the often stormy weather outside. The grey concrete buildings are topped with black roofing felt. A number of separate pavilions, each with a pyramidal roof and periscope-like skylight, document sand, water, wind and light. Between them are small courtyards, pools and walkways. The balcony on the café's upper floor provides views of the surrounding landscape, covered in ever growing amounts of sand. There is also an observation tower looking out over the dunes.

In Utzon's own words: "With its free-standing high walls with their powerful buttresses, the complex achieves the peace and simplicity that bring it into harmony with the grandeur of nature, the surf and the sky."

== The museum ==
The fascinating natural effect of the peninsula inspired the creation of the Nature Centre. Two seas, the Kattegat and the Skagerrak meet at its tip. Then there is the Råbjerg Mile, a huge moving sand dune, Grenen with its sandy beach celebrated by the Skagen Painters and the special light for which Skagen is so famous. The objective of the centre is to allow visitors to see, hear and understand more about sand, water, wind and light. Each of the pavilions presents one of these elements in a special atmosphere created by sound and light. There are special activities for children.

The centre is open from 11 am to 4 pm from 1 May until the third week in October.

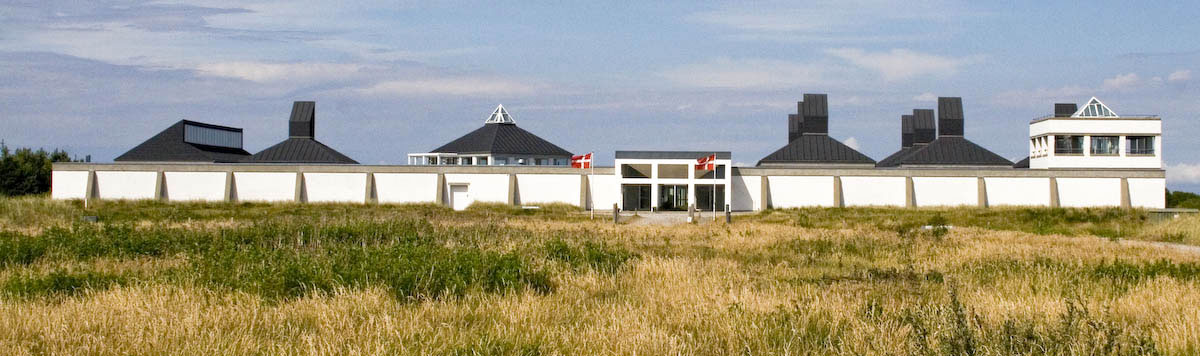

== See also ==
- GeoCenter Møns Klint
