= Skagen Odde =

Peninsula of Denmark

Coordinates: 57°45′N 10°36′E

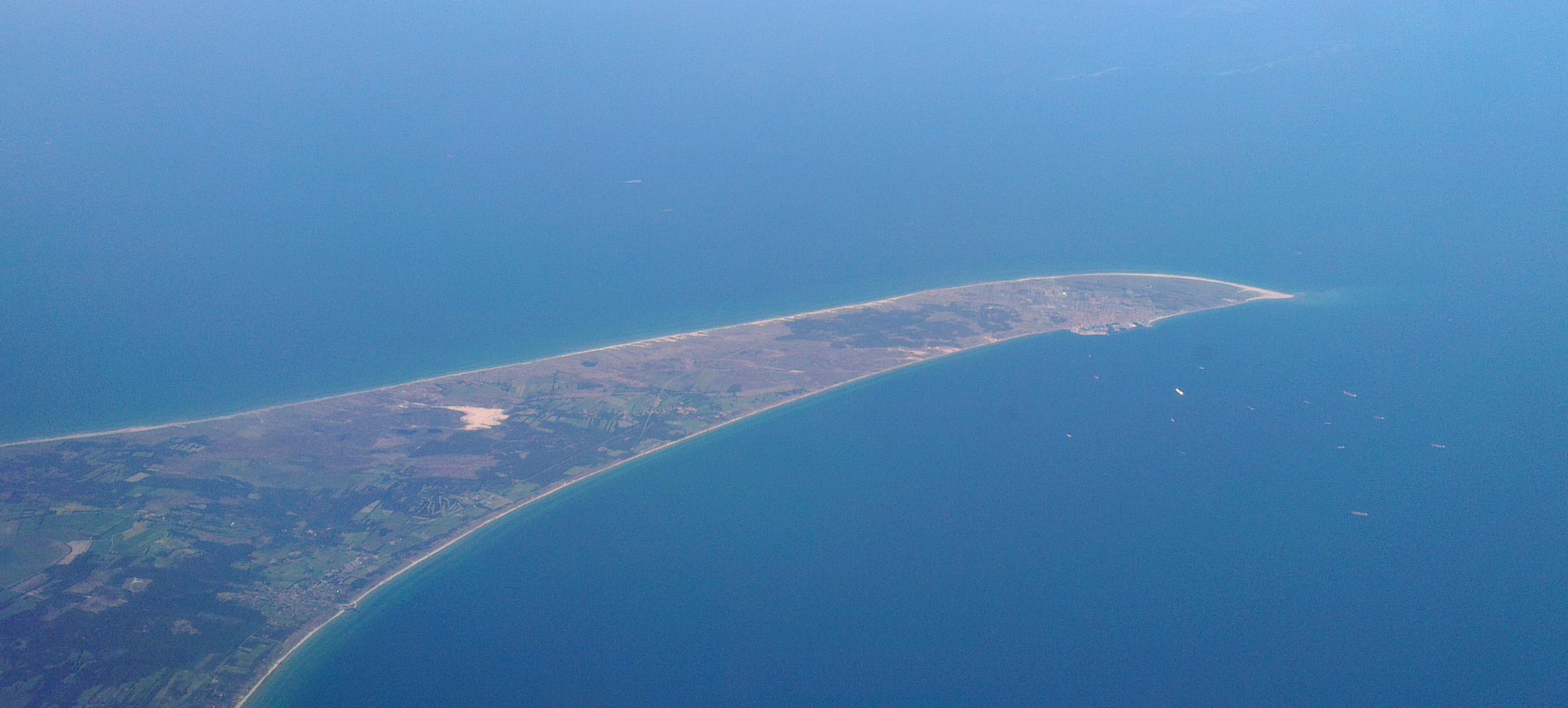
Aerial view of Skagen Odde

Skagen Odde, also Skagens Odde, sometimes known in English as the Scaw Spit or The Skaw, is a sandy peninsula which stretches some 30 km (19 mi) northeast and comprises the northernmost area of Vendsyssel in Jutland, Denmark.

Skagen Odde is reported to be one of the largest spit systems in Europe, created by a continuous process of marine sand and gravel deposition, moved in a north-east direction by longshore currents. The width of the spit varies from 3 to 7 km (1.9 to 4.3 mi).

Grenen is commonly believed to be the northernmost point of Denmark proper. However, since the point greatly curves towards the east, the true northern point lies at the nearby Skagen Nordstrand. This can be noticed easily by looking at a map of the area.

== Geography ==
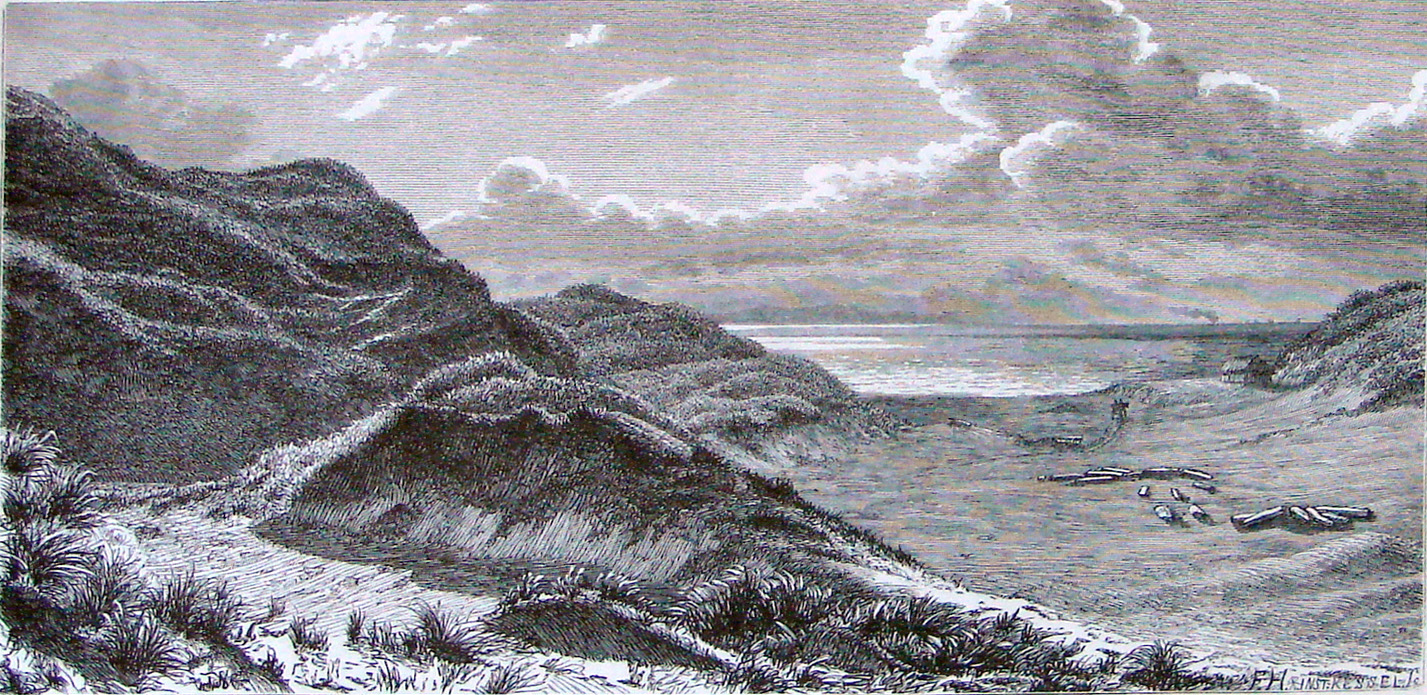
Kandestederne

Skagen Odde covers the narrow peninsula from Ålbæk in the south, to the area around Grenen in the northeast where the Skagerrak meets the Kattegat. It comprises the towns of Skagen, Hulsig and the holiday resort of Kandestederne. At Kandestederne, the coastal cliff is noted to be raised with marine deposits. Protected areas of the peninsula include Grenen at 350 ha (860 acres), Hulsig Hede at 2,170 ha (5,400 acres), Råbjerg Mile at 1,620 ha (4,000 acres), and part of Bunken Klitplantage at 670 ha (1,700 acres).

Still in a state of flux, the peninsula was formed some 15,000 years ago when the ice melted around Vendsyssel creating a coastline stretching south to Frederikshavn. It was formed by sedimentary materials drifting from Jutland's west coast. The northernmost point is located on Skagen Nordstrand, where currents bring sand to the Skagens Rev reef, causing it to grow (20–25 ft (6.1–7.6 m)) in an easterly direction every year while the western side is slowly eroded. This explains why the summer houses built on the coast around 1900 are now some 500 m (1,600 ft) from the beach. The sand spit is reported to be extending at the rate 4 m (13 ft) per year. The spit's evolution has been "influenced by isostatic uplift (causing a drop in relative sea level) and eustatic sea level change."

== Wildlife ==
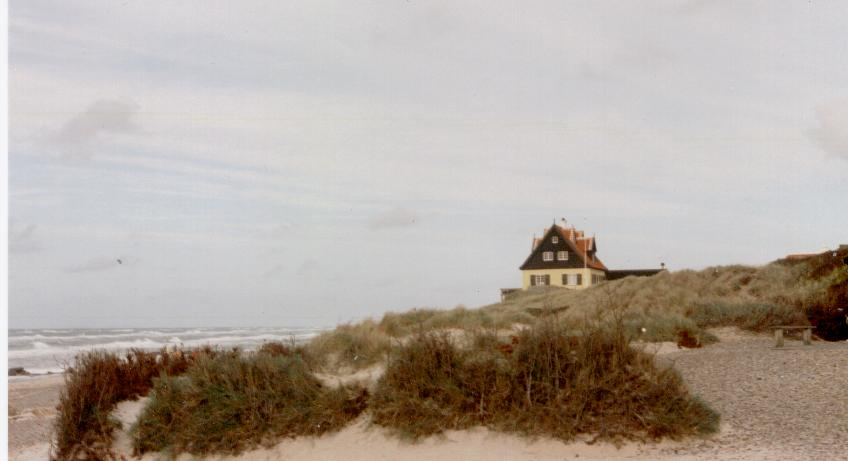
Flora cover on the dunes.

The particular flora and fauna are attributed to the Odde's sand and salt air climate.

The dunes are covered with heath, purple heather and other plants, both indigenous and cultivated. The dune pansy is a native flower with colors ranging from white to blue-violet. Creeping willow curls in the shape of a rose called the "Skagen rose". While not a flower, it is dried and used to decorate souvenirs. The dune plantation was established in 1888 to the south of Skagen, and developed on both sides of the road that runs between Frederikshavn and Skagen, in order to stop the sand dunes from moving. It also facilitated better fishing catches. To the south, plantations (some even 100 years old) feature trees, including pines (mountain pine, Austrian pine, Scots pine and contorta), spruce, oak, birch in patches, as well as reindeer moss. These cultivated forests are also recreational areas, with well laid-out walkways. Here, the forest floor is spread with anemones, corydalis, scented honeysuckle and moss.

Common fauna include red squirrel, red fox, deer, hare and European adder. The sand lizard, the brown tiger beetle, and the labyrinth spider have also been reported.

Birds gather at the Odde's "Lands-end", particularly during the spring breeding and autumn migration seasons. Raptors are the dominant species during the spring. During April–May, recorded species include white-tailed sea eagle, golden eagle, buzzard, red kite and crane. In autumn seabirds gather. northern gannet, common guillemot and many species of skua are commonly noted, as well as nightjar, woodlark, and coal tit. The area of Skagens Odde and Grenen works as a bottleneck, funnelling the migratory birds across the seas to Bohuslän in Sweden each spring. Therefore, it is regarded as the best site for bird observing in the country and the best site for observing migratory birds of prey in all of Northern Europe. Since 2005 the annual Skagen Bird Festival have been celebrated here, centered around Skagen's White Lighthouse. The Festival attracts more than a thousand visitors and participants.

== Attractions ==
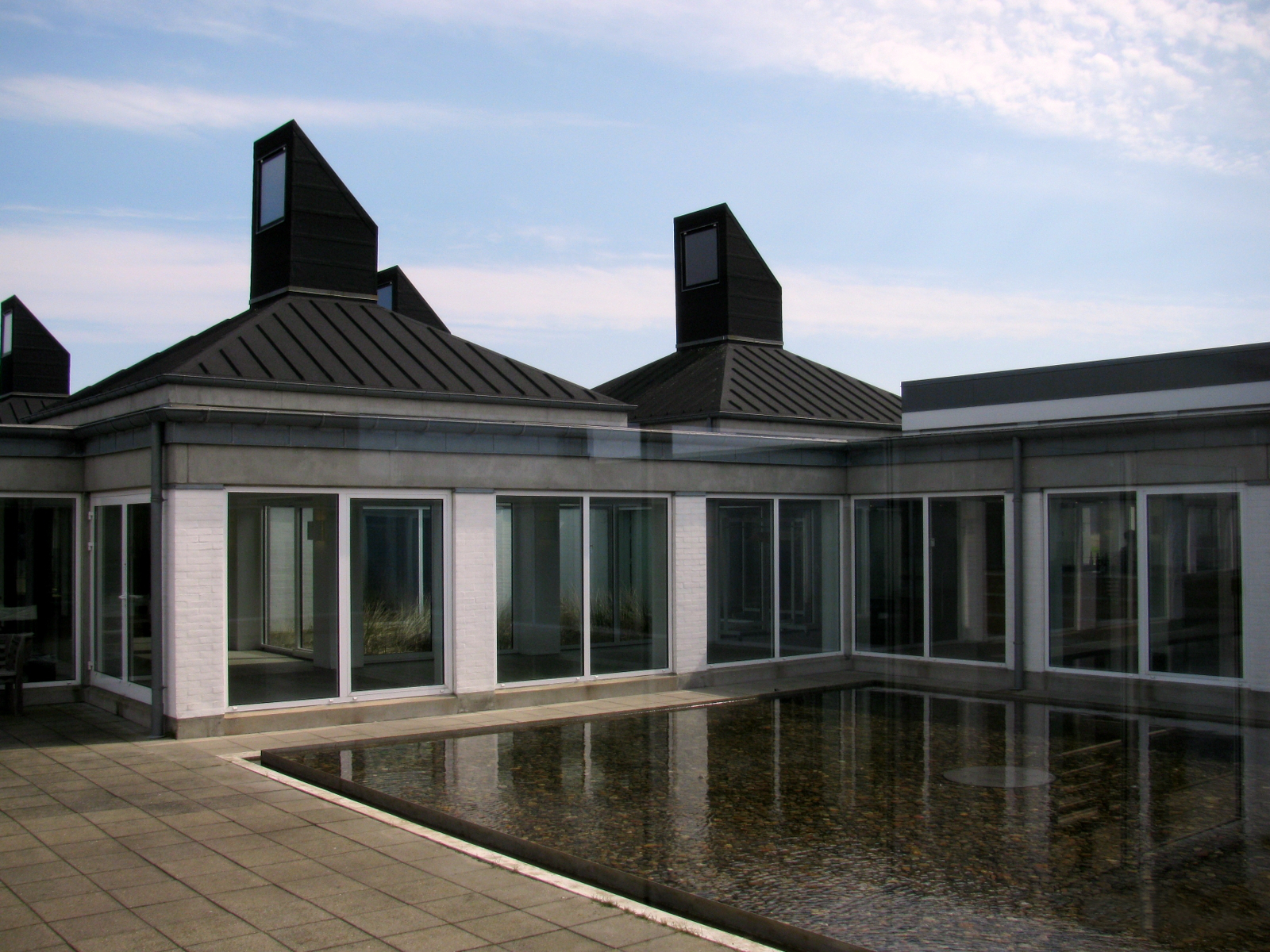
Skagen Odde Naturcenter

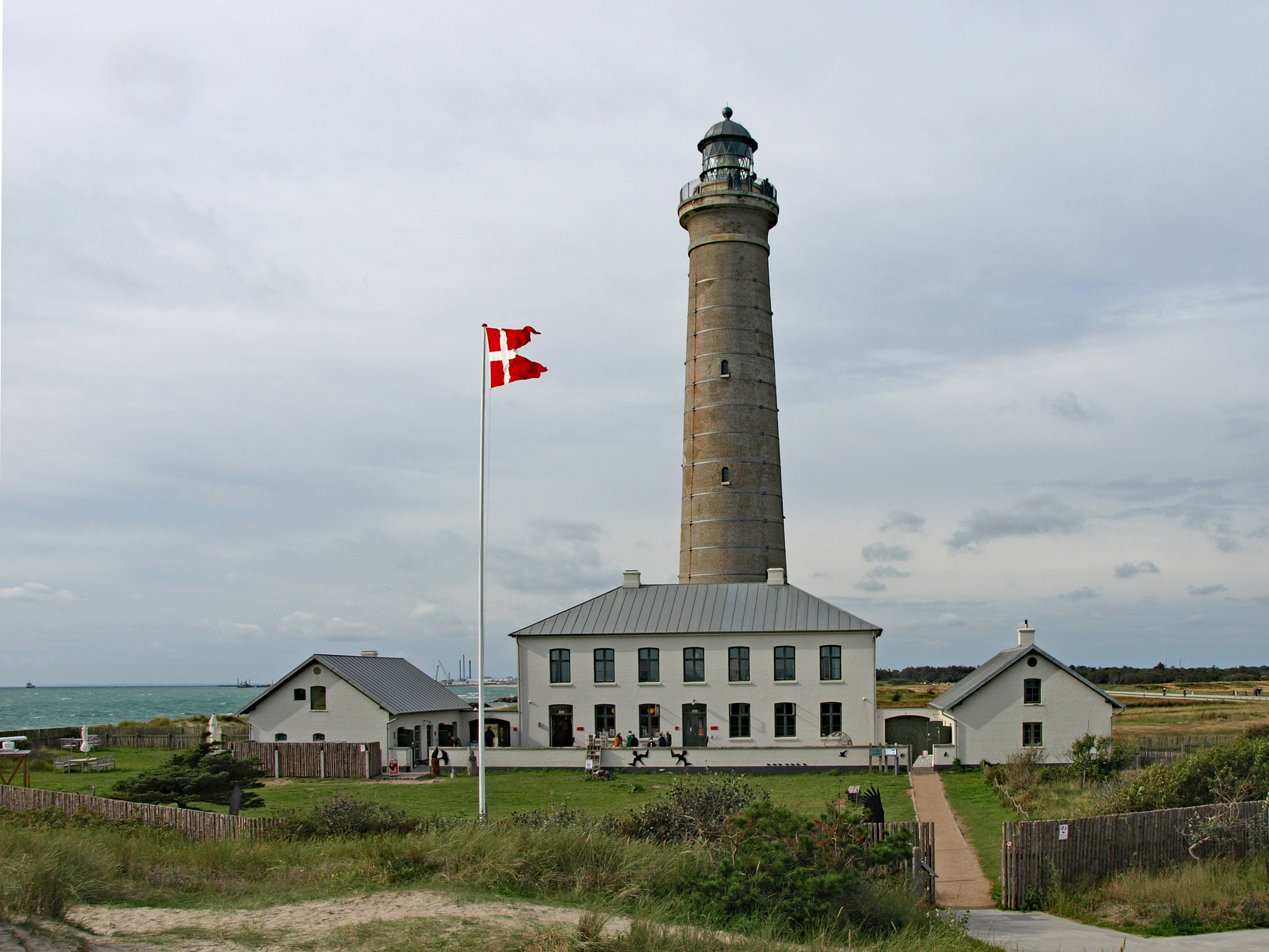
The lighthouse at Skagen

The Skagen Odde Nature Centre located near the northern tip is a museum devoted to the effects of sand, water, wind and light. Designed by Jørn Utzon, it is the most northerly building on Skagen Odde. A primitive light erected on Skagen Odde in 1695 to mark the spit's end has been reconstructed in a more inland position, while three lighthouse towers, all still standing, have been constructed on Skagen Odde.

Byfogedgården is Denmark's northernmost beech forest. Inside is Krøyer's House, which was rented by Marie and P.S. Krøyer (a bailiff) from 1895 to 1909 and now converted into a museum. Refugees from Eastern Prussia were once housed in open areas of the forest. On what were once the sea shores of the Spirbakken settlements, relics of Neolithic, Bronze Age, early Iron Age (about 500 BC) and Viking hunters are occasionally found buried in the sand. The St. Laurentii Church was buried in the sand drift disaster of the 1700s. It was probably built in 1387 and closed down in 1795.

== See also ==
- Sjællands Odde
