= Gedser Odde =

Denmark's southernmost point

Coordinates: 54°33′33″N 11°58′11″E

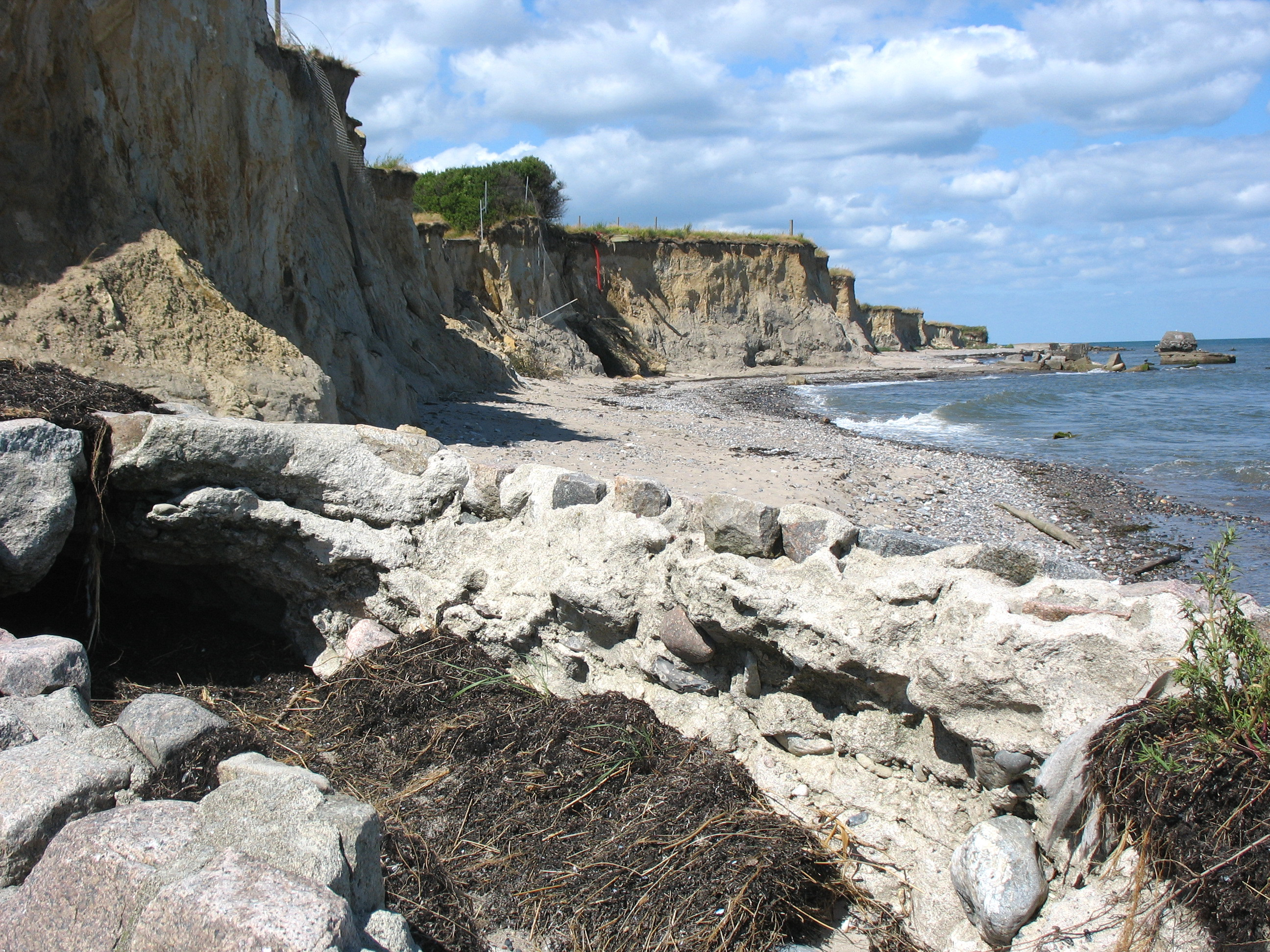
Cliffs at Gedser Odde, Falster

Gedser Odde on the island of Falster in the Baltic Sea is Denmark's southernmost point. The terminal moraine from Idestrup through Skelby to Gedser is part of the maximum glaciation line across Falster, from Orehoved to Gedser. Fronted by low cliffs, the ridge, 5–7 m (16–23 ft) high, continues underwater a further 18 km (11 mi) south-east to Gedser Rev. Sydstenen (the south stone) marks the southernmost point.

== Geology ==
The coastal cliff at Gedser Odder is almost always exposed. The strata deposited during the last ice age can be clearly seen, but lake sediments have also been exposed, from the lowering of the terrain. The sediments from the postglacial period contain fossils of freshwater snails and mussels, evidence of a freshwater episode in the Baltic. The ice age strata consist mostly of moraines of clay and boulders deposited by the melting glacier. Traces of pink in the moraines come from red sandstone plucked up in the Baltic Sea.

== Birds ==
Gedser Odde is a good site for observing migratory birds, especially on windy days. Common eiders can be seen in large numbers around the point in the spring (from the end of March to the beginning of April) and autumn. It is not uncommon for as many as 40,000 per day to fly past. The common scoter is viewable throughout the year in flocks of as many as 3,000. In the autumn, migratory geese can be seen in their thousands. Other species crossing the area include the red-throated loon, pomarine skua, the long-tailed jaeger, and great skua. Gedser Odde is probably the area with the most little gulls in both the spring and the autumn with up to a thousand per day.

Among the birds of prey which frequent the area in fairly large numbers between the southernmost point and the Gedser Marina are the rough-legged buzzard, red kite (often flying low), the western marsh harrier and common buzzard. Smaller birds also occur, including the western yellow wagtail, meadow pipit, common chaffinch and brambling. Much less common species have on occasion also been observed in the area, such as little egret, black stork, Steller's eider, short-toed snake eagle, Blyth's reed warbler, great reed warbler, eastern olivaceous warbler, barred warbler, brown warbler and rock bunting.

== Features ==
Gedser Fyr, a square, 20-metre-high (66 ft) lighthouse, sits 0.7 km (770 yd) north-west of Gedser Odde point. The tower features a light and a racon, or radar transponder, and can be ascended. Extending for about 16 km (10 mi) north from Gedser Odde, Falster's east coast is protected by a dyke. Submarine cables extending north-east, south-east, and south-south-east lie off Gedser Odde.

== See also ==
- Lightvessel Gedser Rev
- List of countries by southernmost point
