= Lågemade Lighthouse =

Lighthouse in Denmark

Lågemade Lighthouse Lågemade Fyr
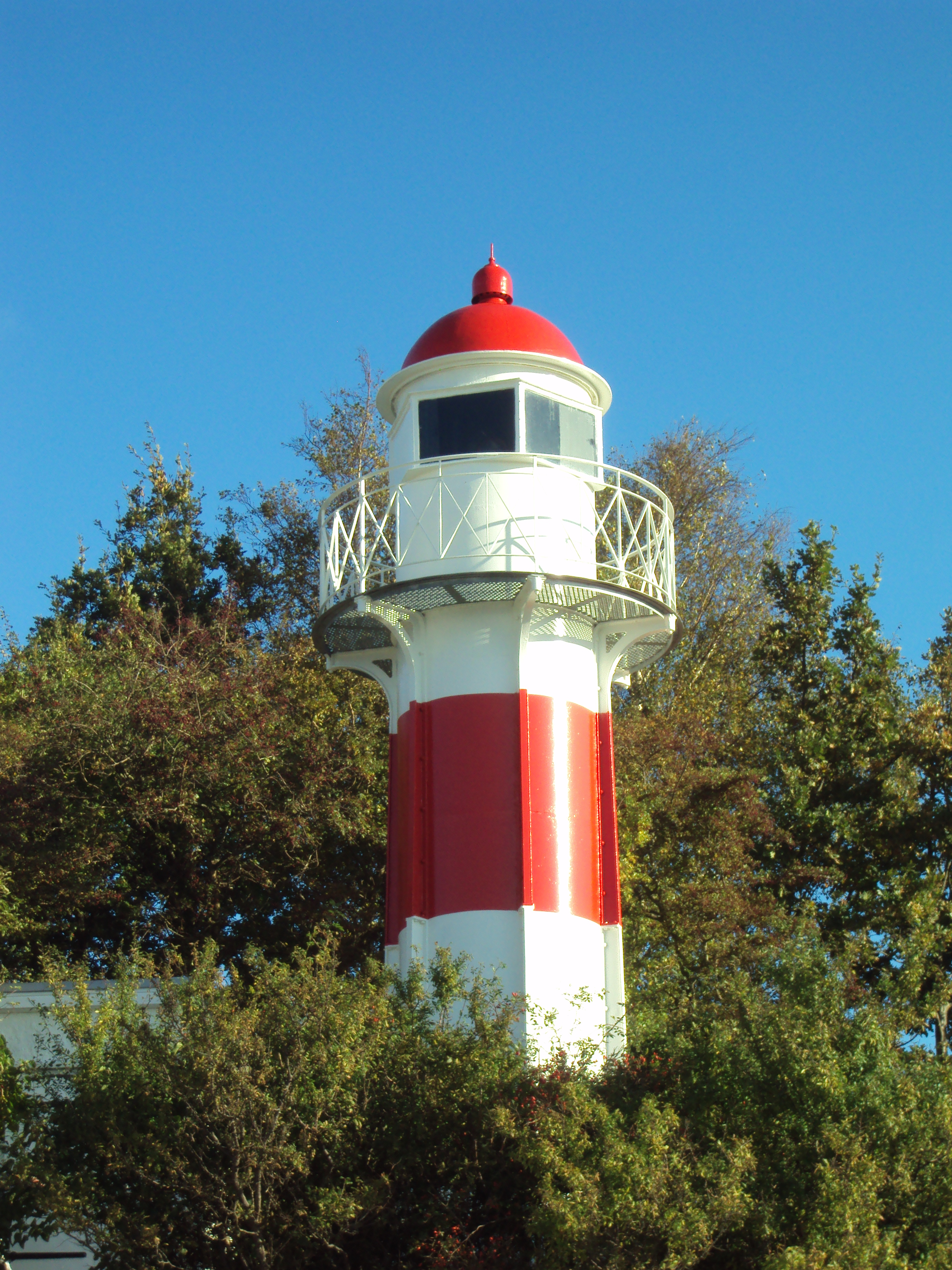
- Location: Egernsund, Sønderborg Municipality, Denmark
- Coordinates: 54.9018°N 9.6144°E

Tower
- Constructed: 1896
- Construction: 1896
- Height: 8 m (26 ft)

Light
- Focal height: 13 m (43 ft)
- Range: 17 nmi (31 km; 20 mi)
- Characteristic: Iso R 2s

The Lågemade Lighthouse (Danish : Lågemade Fyr) is a lighthouse in Denmark. It was built in 1896, on the Danish side of the Flensburg Firth and is located on the Broager Peninsula close to Egernsund.
