= Lightvessel Gedser Rev =

Decommissioned Danish light ship

Coordinates: 55.6800°N 12.5897°E

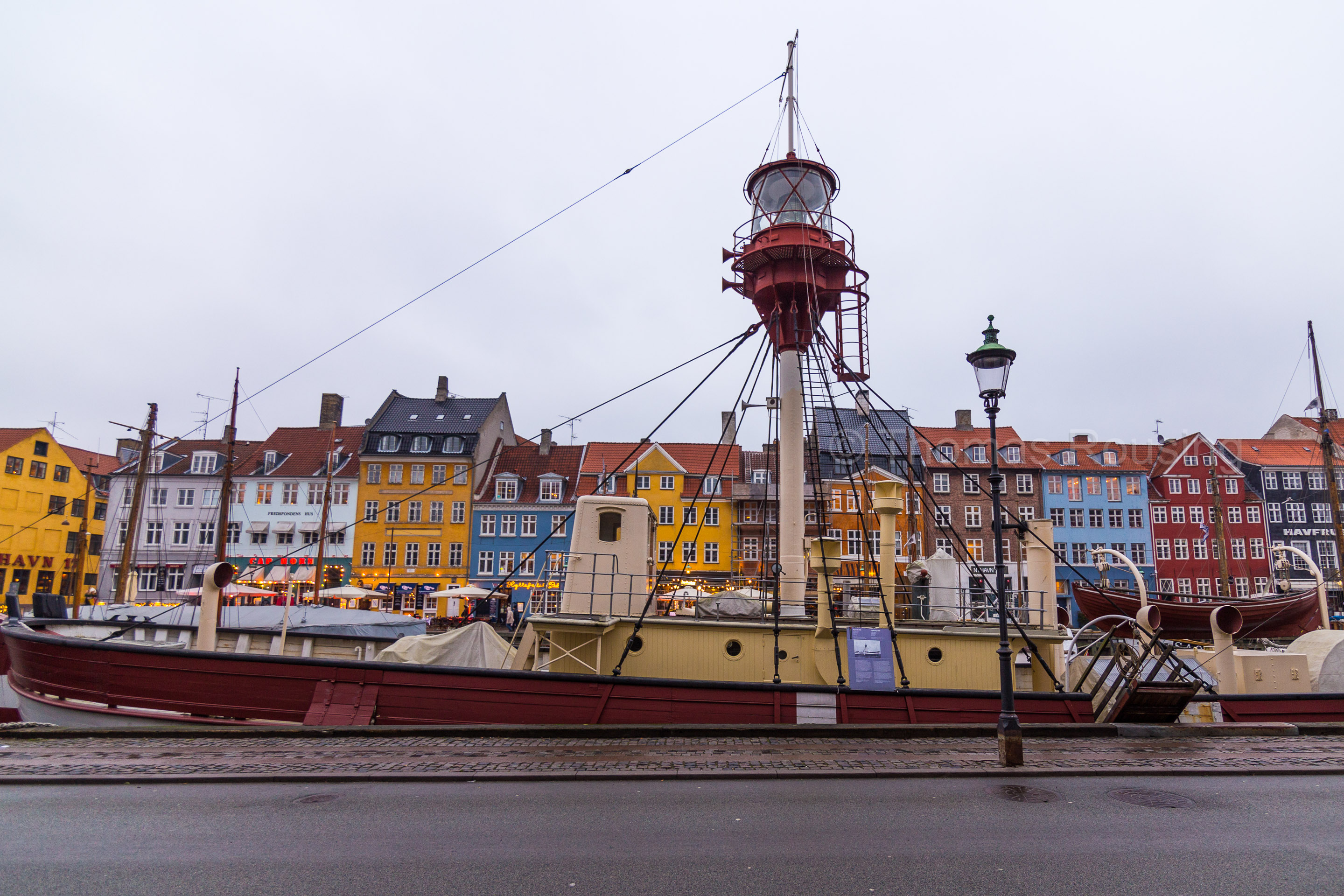
- Lightvessel No. XVII Gedser Rev at Nyhavn in Copenhagen

History

Denmark
- Name: Lightvessel No. XVII Gedser Rev
- Namesake: Gedser Rev
- Builder: N.F. Hansen, Odense
- Launched: 1895
- Decommissioned: 1972
- Status: Museum ship at Nyhavn, Copenhagen, 2003

General characteristics
- Type: Lightvessel
- Length: 33.6 m (110 ft)
- Beam: 6.4 m (21 ft)
- Propulsion: Twin steam engines (until 1918); 16 hp petrol engine (until 1921); 3-cylinder Wayland 135-hp engine

Lightvessel No. XVII Gedser Rev (Danish: Fyrskib XVII Gedser Rev) is a decommissioned lightvessel built in 1895, now serving as a museum ship in Helsingør, Denmark, having formerly been stationed in the Nyhavn Canal in Copenhagen. It is owned by the National Museum and takes its name after Gedser Rev south of Falster where it was stationed most of its working life.

== History ==
Denmark's first lightvessel was built at Jacob Holm's shipyard at Christianshavn in 1829.

Built at N.F. Hansen's shipyard in Odense in 1895, the Gedser Rev was number seventeen in the line of Danish lightvessels. It was first stationed at Lappegrund in shallow waters at the entrance to the Øresund. It was powered by two steam engines which were replaced by a 16-hp kerosene engine in 1918.

In 1921, a new three-cylinder Voelund 135-hp propulsion engine was installed and the ship was moved to a position at Gedser Rev, south of Falster, itself the southernmost point of Denmark.

In 1940, when Denmark was occupied by Germany in World War II, the German occupying forces confiscated the ship and placed it near Kalundborg, but it returned to its old position in 1945 after the war had ended.

The ship was involved in a number of collisions during her years in operation. The most serious of these occurred in 1954 when she sank within a few minutes. The seaman on duty was thrown overboard and drowned while the rest of the crew were saved.

During the Cold War and after the building of the Berlin Wall in 1961, many East Germans chose to escape by water, heading North to Denmark. Although most failed and many died in the attempt, at least 50 were rescued by the Gedser Rev. As the southernmost limit of Danish territory and as an obviously recognisable target, many aimed for the lightship. One notable escapee was Manfred Burmeister in 1969, who escaped by aid of a petrol-driven submersible scooter. (Note: See Aqua scooter for a similar escape in 1967, by Bernd Boettger.)

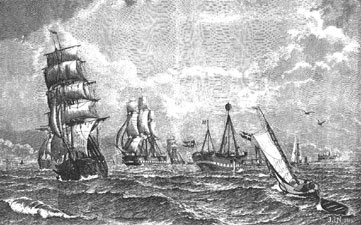
Lightvessel No. XVII at Lappegrund in 1896

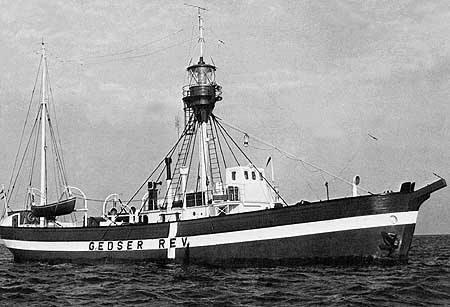
Lightvessel No. XVII at Gedser Rev in c. 1948

== Museum ship ==
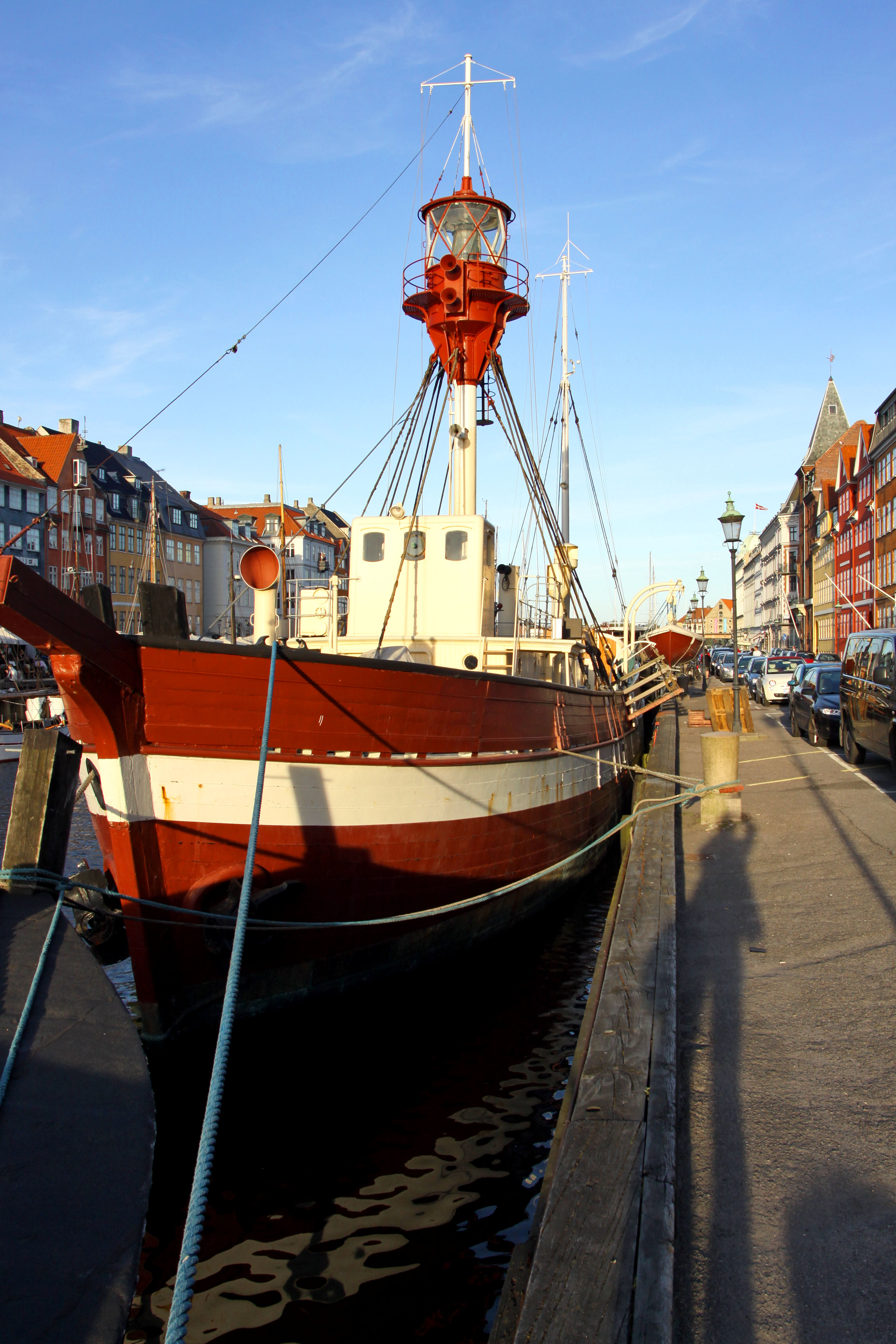
Lightvessel No. XVII Gedser Rev at Nyhavn in Copenhagen

Lightvessel No. XVII was decommissioned in 1972 and put up for sale at the lightship warehouse at Holmen in Copenhagen. A donation from the A. P. Møller Foundation enabled the National Museum to purchase it. The A. P. Møller Foundation also sponsored the ship's restoration which was carried out at Hvide Sande Shipyard from January 2001 until November 2003.

The lightvessel's regular home for several years has been the Nyhavn Canal in Copenhagen, Denmark where was open to the public Saturdays from 11 am to 3 pm from June through August. It was maintained by a group of volunteers.

On 9 May 2018 it was towed from Nyhavn to dock 2 in Helsingør harbor, to be exhibited there for five years.

== Coin ==
On 27 May 2009 Bank of Denmark issued a new 20 krone coin with lightvessel XVII, as depicted by the artist Karin Lorentzen, on its reverse.

== See also ==
- List of lighthouses and lightvessels in Denmark
