= Listed buildings in Frederikshavn Municipality =

The list of listed buildings in Frederishavn Municipality enumerates historic buildings in Frederikshavn Municipality, Denmark, which have been recognised by the Danish Agency of Culture (Kulturarvsstyrelsen).

Note: This list is incomplete. A complete list of listed buildings in Vordingborg Municipality can be found on Danish Wikipedia.

== The list ==
Listing name	Image	Location	Year built	Contributing resource	Ref
Admiralgården		Østre Strandvej 51, 9990 Skagen	1915	Three-winged building from 1915 designed by Ulrik Plesner	
Bangsbo		Dronning Margrethes Vej 1, 9900 Frederikshavn	18th century	Three-winged manor house from the 18th century	
Bangsbo		Dronning Margrethes Vej 1, 9900 Frederikshavn	17th century	Half-timbered barn from the 17th century	
Brøndums Hotel		Anchersvej 3, 9990 Skagen	1898	Four-winged hotel complex: Part of the south wing dating from 1874 but adapted and expanded by Ulrik Plesner in 1892; the verenda and west wing from 1898 by Ulrik Plesner; the north wing and connecting hallway by Ulrik Plesner	
Brøndums Hotel		Anchersvej 3, 9990 Skagen	1887	The east wing from 1887 containing restaurant/inn facilities	
Classen's House		Algade 3A, 9300 Sæby		Townhouse originally built before 1781 but the frontage replaced in 1834 and the rear side rebuilt in brick in 1877	
Fiskepakhusene (6)		Fiskehuskaj 1-31 and Rødspættevej 2-6, 9990 Skagen	1907	Six rows of warehouses for the storage of fish from 1907 designed by Thorvald Bindesbøll	
Klitgården		Damstedvej 39, 9990 Skagen	1914	Three-winged house designed by Ulrik Plesner for King Christian X and Queen Alexandrine	
Klitgården		Damstedvej 39, 9990 Skagen	1914	Garage building from 1914	
Lerbæk		Skagensvej 195A, 9900 Frederikshavn	c. 1675	Manor house from the second half of the 17th century and the surrounding moats	
Mayor Hans Gram's House		Algade 12, 9300 Sæby	1624	Half-timbered house from 1624 and the connecting gateway	
Martello Tower		Kragholmen 2, 9900 Frederikshavn	1686	Gunpowder magazine from 1686 designed by Anthony Coucheron, originally part of Frederikshavn Fortress but moved to its current location in 1975	
Michael and Anna Ancher House		Markvej 2, 9990 Skagen	1837/1914	The former home of Anna and Michael Ancher; the south wing originally built between 1827 and 1837 and extended westwards in 1840 and again in 1860; the northern extension from 1914 designed by Ulrik Plesner	
Nordre Skanse		Nordre Skanse 46, 9900 Frederikshavn	c. 1700	Coastal fortification with four bastions dating from c. 1700	
P. S. Krøyer House		Sct. Laurentii Vej 148, 9990 Skagen		The former home of P. S. Krøyer; the oldest part is from the 18th century but extended between 1801 and 1809.	
Saxild's House (2)		Markvej 4, 9990 Skagen	1968	Two detached wings situated perpendicularly to each other, built in c. 1780 but adapted by Ulrik Plesner in 1915	
Skagen Lighthouse (4)		Fyrvej 36, 9990 Skagen	1858	Lighthouse and associated keeper's residence from 1858 designed by N. S. Nebelong	
Skagen Old Lighthouse		Fyrvej 2, 9990 Skagen	1748/1816	Lighthouse from 1848 designed by Philip de Lange and extended in 1816	
Skagen's Vippefyr		Hans Ruths Vej 15, 9990 Skagen		A vippefyr from 1884	
Skagen Town Hall		Sct. Laurentii Vej 87, 9990 Skagen	1968	Former town hall from 1968 designed by Ejnar Borg	
Skagens Museum		Brøndumsvej 4, 9990 Skagen	1914	The old main building, originally dating from the 18th century but rebuilt in 1850	
Skagens Museum		Brøndumsvej 4, 9990 Skagen	1914	The studio building from 1850	
Sæbygård		Sæbygårdvej 49, 9300 Sæby		Three-winged, 18th-century manor house with connecting walls to the northwest and surrounding moats	
Tuxen's House (3)		Tuxens Alle 18A-C, 9990 Skagen	1834/1901	The former home of Laurits Tuxen: The half-timbered, L-shaped building of which the south wing is from 1834 and the east wing is from 1842 but was adapted by Thorvald Jørgensen in 1901 (Tuxens Alle 18A); half-timbered pabilion from 1902 (Tuxens Alle 18B), the detached, haæf-timbered west wing from 1901 (Tuxens Alle 18C); the cobbled central courtyard.	
