= Fire basket =

Iron basket in which wood can be burned

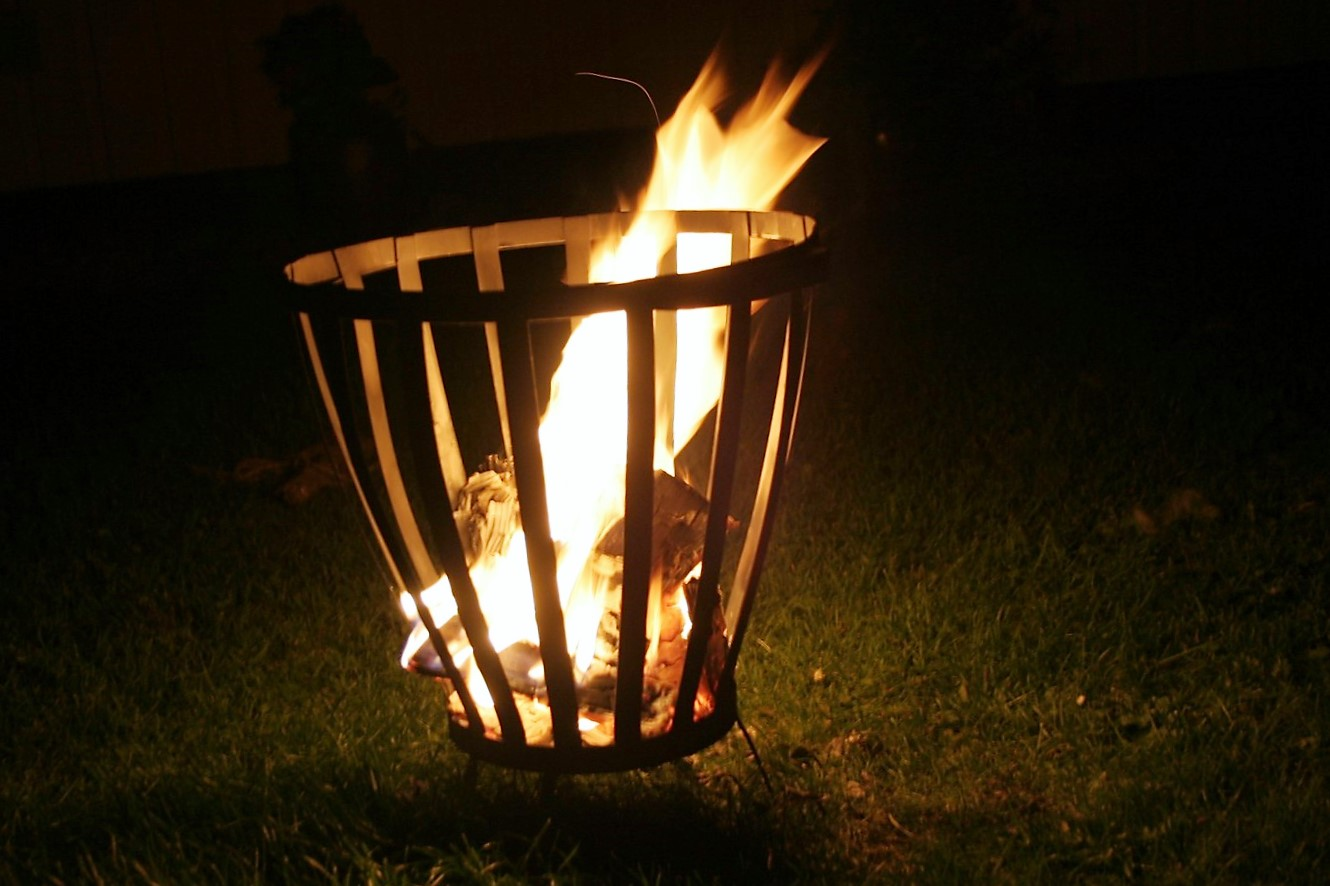
Fire basket

A fire basket is an iron basket in which wood can be burned to make a bonfire. Fire baskets have been used since antiquity mainly to illuminate and heat rooms. Today, they are most often used in an outdoor garden area as an outdoor heater or grill. The fire basket primarily is used to contain firewood, or another fuel, and is meant to offer fire protection.

The basket itself consists of a heat-resistant steel, or iron, container with high side walls that are punctuated by large mesh or grid-like openings, with a bowl underneath to catch the ashes.

A fire basket is similar to a brazier, and is often used not only as a heat source but also for cooking or grilling food.

== Background ==
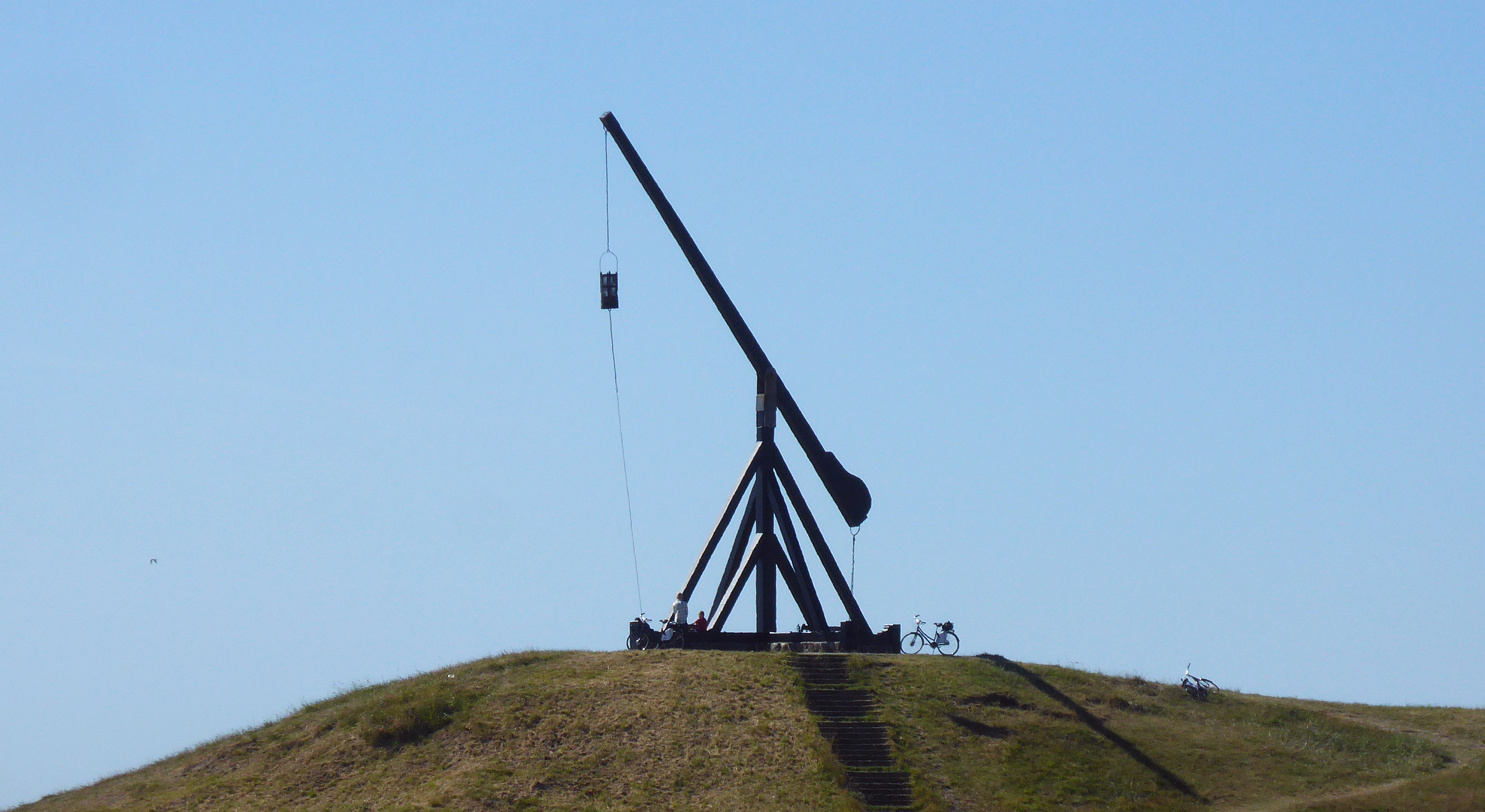
Skagen's Lever Light in Skagen: from 1627 to 1747 fire baskets were raised with a lever arm.

During the Middle Ages fire baskets filled with sulfur were used to repel the Black Death.

In addition to its lighting and heating functions, fire baskets have a wide variety of uses. Before document shredders, the fire basket was widely used to burn secret documents, and fire baskets are most often found in a garden for heat and light. The beacon atop the Altenburg castle in Bamberg served to communication with the neighboring Giechburg castle.

Historically, fire baskets were used in lighthouses, such as Skagen's White Lighthouse, as the beacon. In the 16th century, Frederick II ordered the erection of beacons at Skagen, Anholt and Kullen Lighthouse to mark the main route through Danish waters from the North Sea to the Baltic. These "bascule lights" or "tipping lanterns" (Danish: vippefyr) were fire baskets hung from a bascule. In Skagen, the current vippefyr is a reproduction of the original, which dates back to 1626.

== Heraldry ==
A fire basket is an uncommon heraldic figure in heraldry. Another name in Germany is the "pitch basket", or a "straw basket".

A distinction is made between two representations: Only the empty fire basket or the basket with flames licking up from it is shown in the coat of arms and/or in the upper coat of arms. All heraldic colors are used, but black and the metals are used most often. The flames are mostly red. Deviations and special shapes and positions are to be mentioned in the description of the coat of arms. The town of Becherbach uses the fire basket in its coat of arms from the terms pitch and basket.

A cresset is a fire basket on a pole.

Fire basket from the coat of arms of the German community of Becherbach

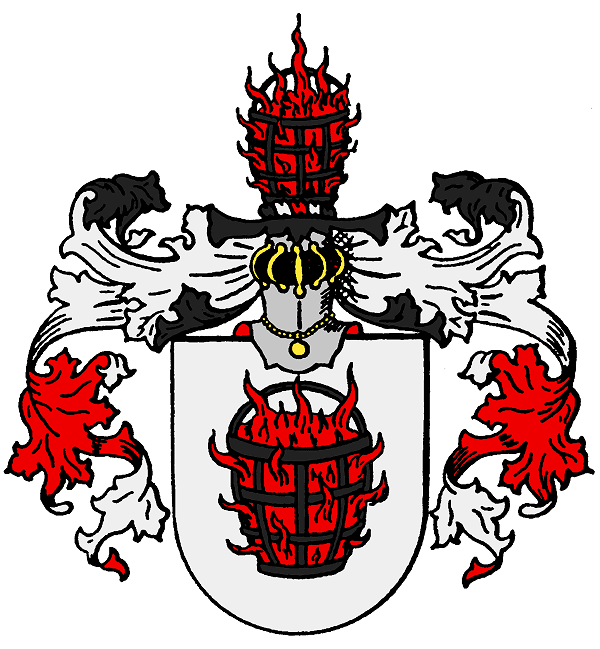
Coat of arms of the Prussian noble family, Proeck

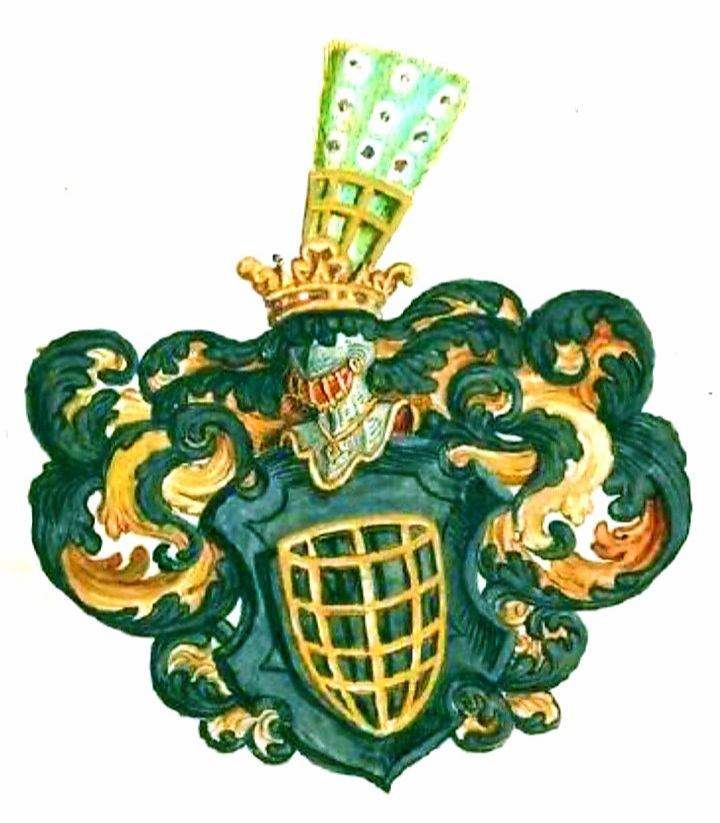
The Württemberg Seuter carried a golden basket in their escutcheon and upper coat of arms.

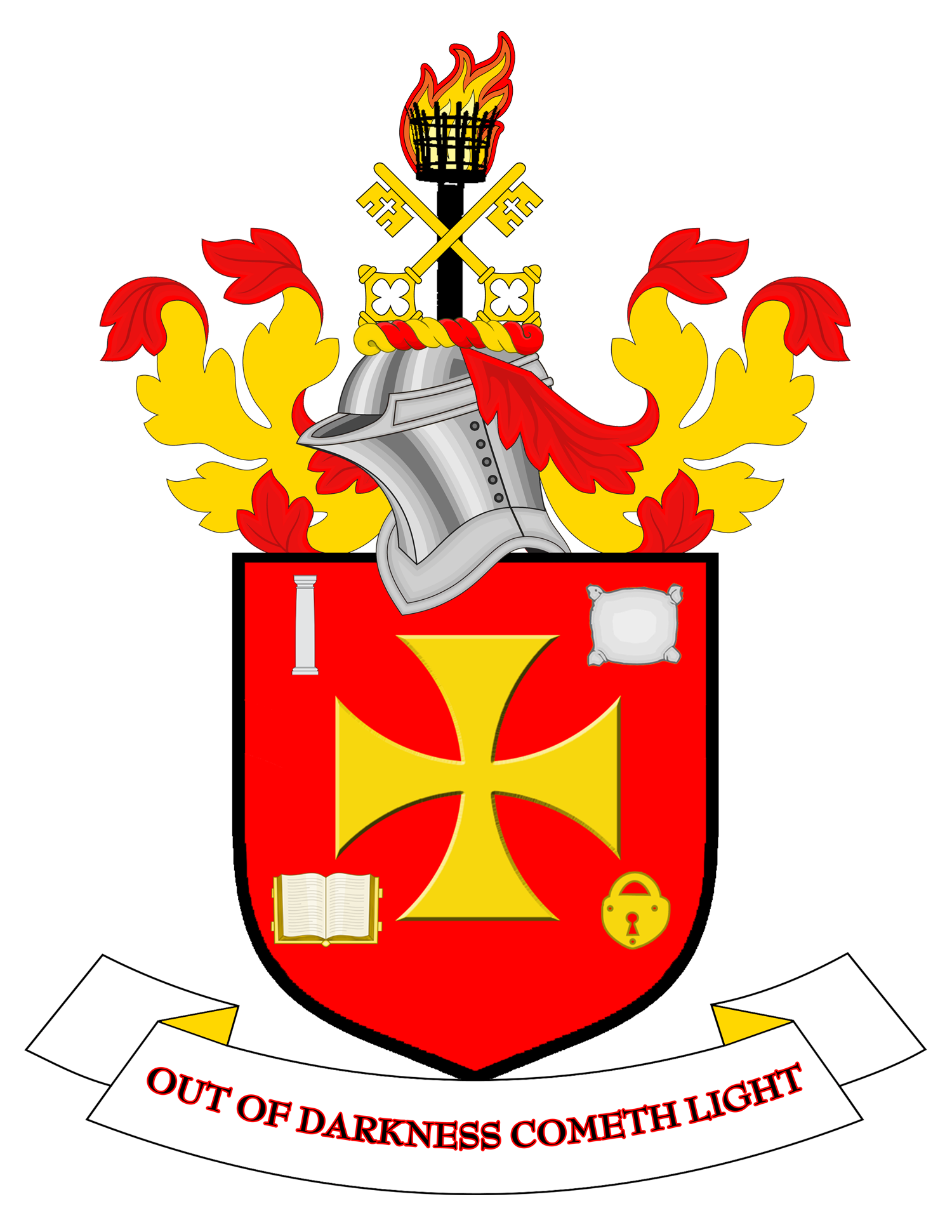
Arms of City of Wolverhampton Council with a stalked fire basket in the crest

== Gallery ==
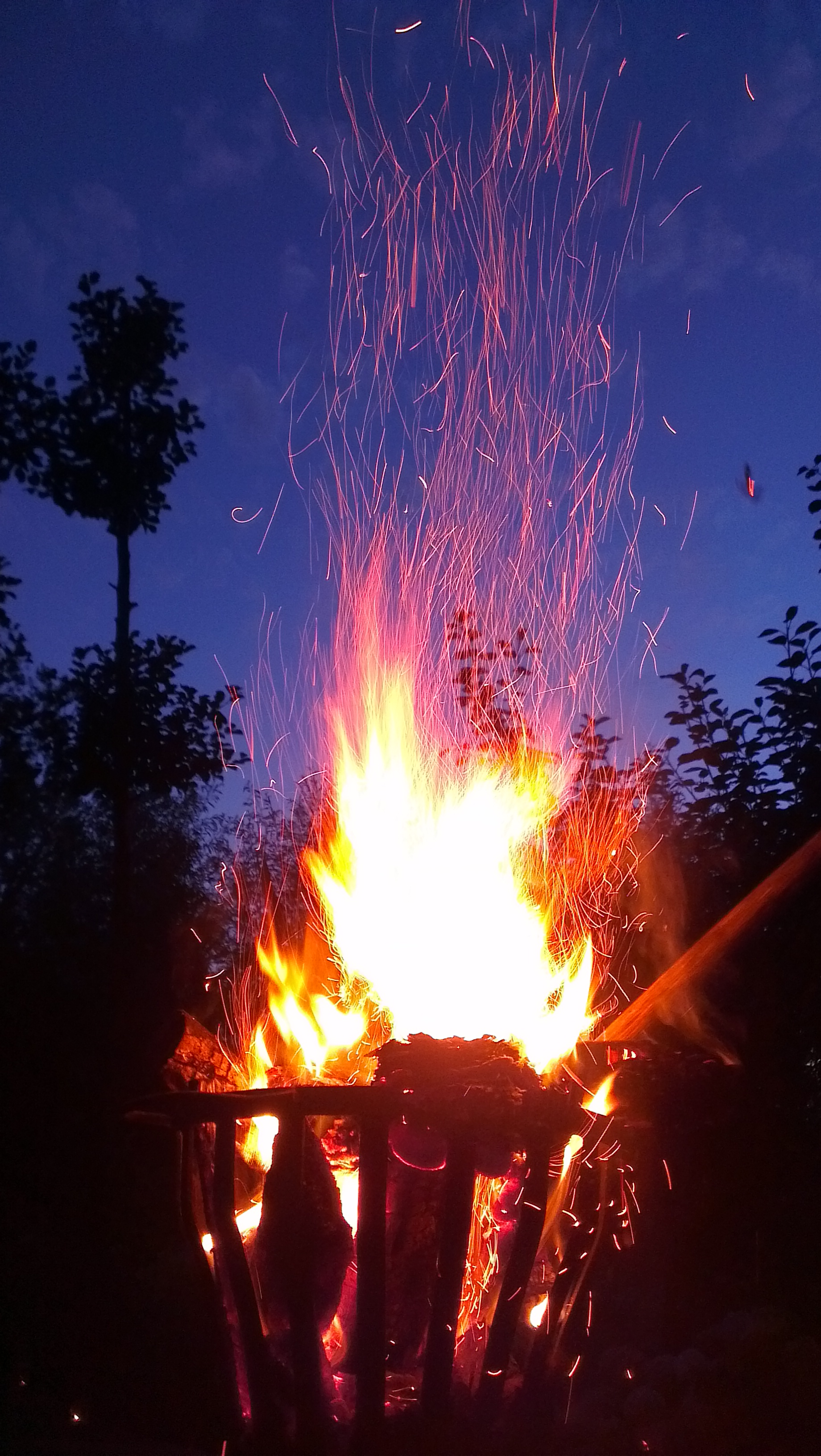
A fire in a basket

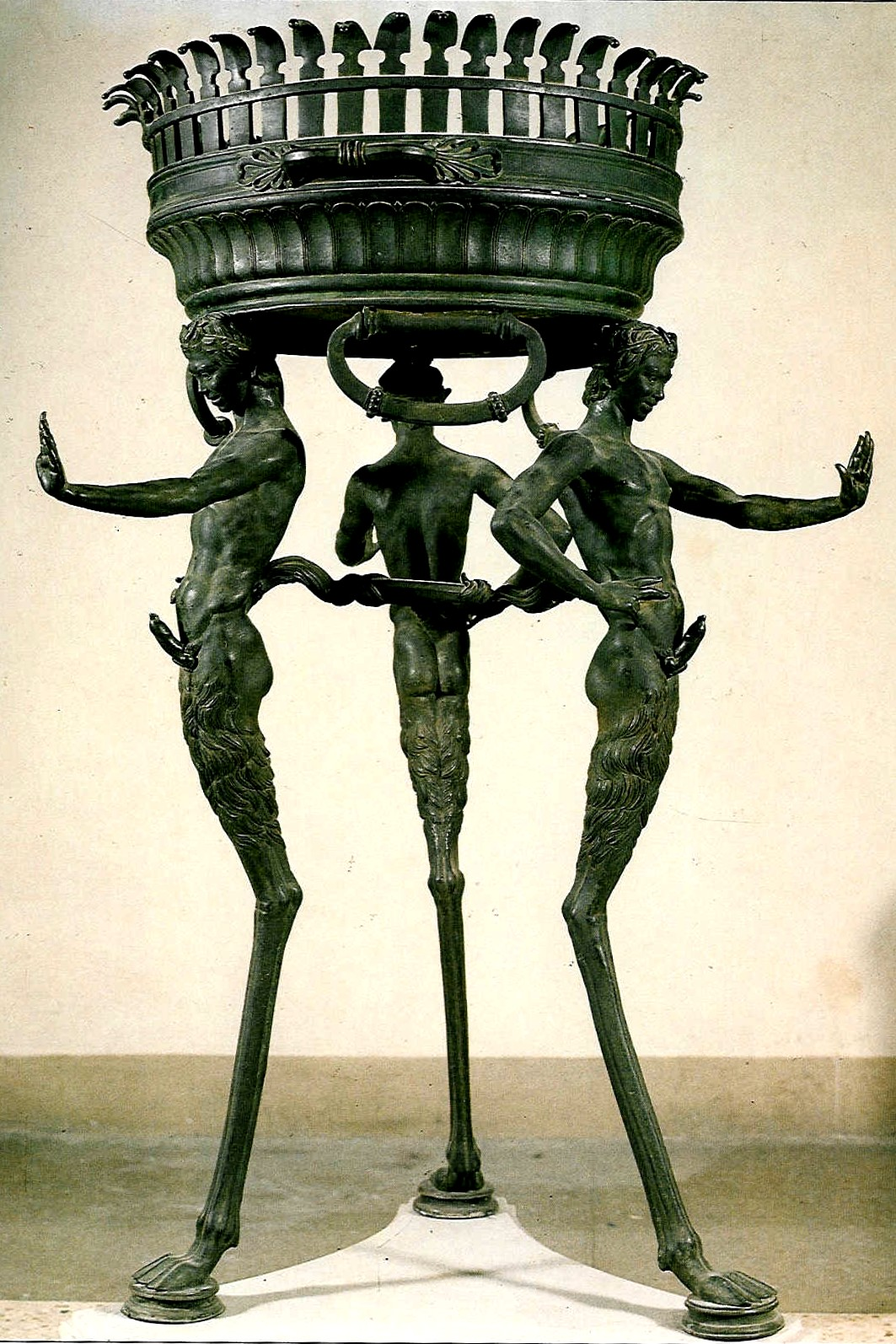
A fire basket from Pompeii

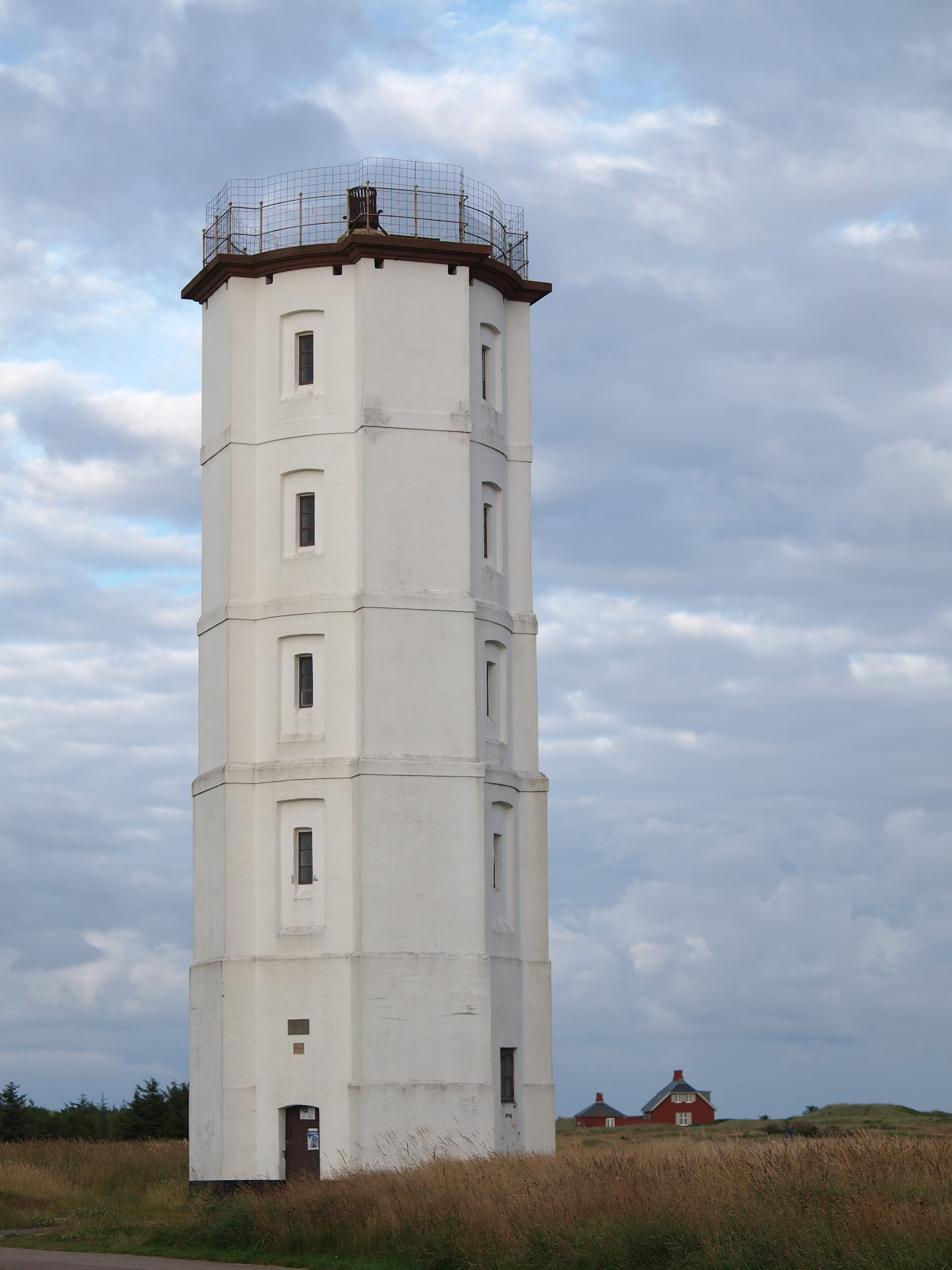
The retired Skagen's White Lighthouse in Skagen, North Judland, Denmark. On the roof is the fire basket once used as a beacon.

== See also ==
- Family coat of arms of the Proeck family
- Franklin stove
