= List of shipwrecks in December 1833 =

The list of shipwrecks in December 1833 includes ships sunk, foundered, grounded, or otherwise lost during December 1833.

== 1 December ==
List of shipwrecks: 1 December 1833
Ship	State	Description
Friends	United Kingdom	The ship was in collision with the brig Blakeney (United Kingdom) at Leith, Lothian and sank. Her crew were rescued.
Theresa Alicia	Netherlands	The ship was driven ashore near New York, United States. Her crew were rescued. She was on a voyage from Amsterdam, North Holland to New York.

== 2 December ==
List of shipwrecks: 2 December 1833
Ship	State	Description
Dorothea	United States	The ship was driven ashore at Berck, Pas-de-Calais, France. Her crew were rescued. She was on a voyage from New York to Rotterdam, South Holland, Netherlands.
Pommerania	Hamburg	The ship was wrecked on Skagen, Denmark. Her crew were rescued. She was on a voyage from Hamburg to Jersey, Channel Islands.
Trident	United Kingdom	The ship departed from Porthcawl, Glamorgan for Liverpool, Lancashire. No further trace, presumed foundered in the Irish Sea with the loss of all hands.

== 3 December ==
List of shipwrecks: 3 December 1833
Ship	State	Description
Ann	United Kingdom	The ship was wrecked near Harlingen, Friesland, Netherlands. Her crew were rescued. She was on a voyage from London to Harlingen.
Lord Blayney	United Kingdom	The steamship was wrecked at the Point of Ayr, Cheshire with the loss of all seventeen of her crew. She was on a voyage from Warrenpoint, County Antrim to Liverpool, Lancashire.
Success	United Kingdom	The ship was wrecked on the Haisborough Sands, in the North Sea off the coast of Norfolk. Her crew were rescued.

== 4 December ==
List of shipwrecks: 4 December 1833
Ship	State	Description
Helen	United Kingdom	The sloop was driven ashore and wrecked in the River Foyle She was on a voyage from Ayr to Londonderry.
Lively	United Kingdom	The ship was driven ashore in Widewall Bay. She was on a voyage from London to Sligo.
Walney Star	United Kingdom	The ship was driven ashore near Maryport, Cumberland.

== 5 December ==
List of shipwrecks: 5 December 1833
Ship	State	Description
Bien Aime	France	The ship was driven ashore at Paimbœuf, Loire-Inférieure. She was on a voyage from Berwick on Tweed, Northumberland, United Kingdom to Boulogne, Pas-de-Calais.
City of Limerick	United Kingdom	The schooner was driven ashore and wrecked at Ballybunion, County Kerry. Her crew survived. She was on a voyage from Limerick to London.
Siren	United Kingdom	The ship departed from Havana, Cuba for London. No further trace, presumed foundered with the loss of all hands.

== 6 December ==
List of shipwrecks: 6 December 1833
Ship	State	Description
Albion	United Kingdom	The brig was driven ashore at Padstow, Cornwall.
Grace	United Kingdom	The ship sprang a leak off "Cape Granitala" and was abandoned by her crew. She was on a voyage from Cardiff, Glamorgan to Constantinople, Ottoman Empire.
Laurel	United Kingdom	The ship caught fire at Derbyhaven, Isle of Man and was scuttled. She was on a voyage from Newry, County Down to Liverpool, Lancashire.
Plymouth	United States	The ship was driven ashore at Plum Point, Virginia. She was on a voyage from Amsterdam, North Holland, Netherlands to Baltimore, Maryland.

== 7 December ==
List of shipwrecks: 7 December 1833
Ship	State	Description
Earl of Aberdeen	United Kingdom	The brig was driven ashore and wrecked in Dundrum Bay. She was on a voyage from Quebec City, Lower Canada, British North America to Belfast, County Antrim.
Henry	United Kingdom	The ship was driven ashore at Memel, Prussia. She was a wreck by 16 December.

== 8 December ==
List of shipwrecks: 8 December 1833
Ship	State	Description
Atlantic	United Kingdom	The ship was driven ashore at Patchogue, New York. She was on a voyage from Liverpool, Lancashire to New York. Atlantic broke up on 17 December.
Friendship	United Kingdom	The ship was driven ashore and wrecked at Peterhead, Aberdeenshire.
Hope	United Kingdom	The ship was wrecked on the Isle of Man. She was on a voyage from the Douro to Glasgow, Renfrewshire.
Michael Wickham	United Kingdom	The schooner was wrecked at Wexford. She was on her maiden voyage, from Wexford to Dublin.

== 9 December ==
List of shipwrecks: 9 December 1833
Ship	State	Description
Atlantic	United Kingdom	The ship was driven ashore at Far Rockaway, New York, United States. She was on a voyage from Liverpool, Lancashire to New York City.
Providence	United Kingdom	The brig was driven ashore in Carmarthen Bay. Her crew were rescued.
Spray	United Kingdom	The ship departed from Demerara for the Clyde. No further trace, presumed foundered with the loss of all hands.

== 10 December ==
List of shipwrecks: 10 December 1833
Ship	State	Description
Adrian	United Kingdom	The ship foundered in the Atlantic Ocean (45°55′N 13°00′W). Her crew were rescued by James Dunn (United Kingdom). Adrian was on a voyage from Quebec City, Lower Canada, British North America to London.
Comet	Norway	The ship was wrecked in the Vlie. She was on a voyage from Bergen, Norway to Genoa, Kingdom of Sardinia.
Hyperion	United States	The ship was driven ashore in the River Plate.

== 11 December ==
List of shipwrecks: 11 December 1833
Ship	State	Description
Admiral Rowley	United Kingdom	The ship sprang a leak and was abandoned in the North Sea off Orfordness, Suffolk. Her crew were rescued by Acorn (United Kingdom).
Duncan	United Kingdom	The ship was wrecked at Berck, Pas-de-Calais, France. with the loss of her captain. Her crew were subsequently arrested on suspicion of murder. They were later acquitted.
Eliza	United States	The ship was wrecked on the Calcot Bank, in the North Sea. She was on a voyage from Antwerp, Belgium to Salem, Massachusetts.
Margaret	United Kingdom	The ship was driven ashore on Vlieland, Friesland, Netherlands.
Margaret	United Kingdom	The ship was driven ashore in the Shetland Islands.
Mary Ann	United Kingdom	The ship sprang a leak and was beached at Cairnryan, Wigtownshire. She was repaired and refloated. Mary Ann was on a voyage from Dunfanaghy, County Donegal to Glasgow, Renfrewshire.
Mary Ann	United Kingdom	The ship was driven ashore at Danzig, Prussia but was later refloated. She was on a voyage from Saint Petersburg, Russia to London.
Neptune	France	The ship was driven ashore near "Pasawark", Prussia.
Rusco Castle	United Kingdom	The ship was driven ashore in the Dardanelles. She was refloated on 18 December.

== 12 December ==
List of shipwrecks: 12 December 1833
Ship	State	Description
Jane	United Kingdom	The brig was wrecked in Llandudno Bay. Her crew were rescued. She was on a voyage from Youghal, County Cork to Liverpool, Lancashire.
Margaret	United Kingdom	The ship was driven ashore at Caernarfon. All on board were rescued. She was on a voyage from Montreal, Lower Canada, British North America to Liverpool, Lancashire.
Maria	United Kingdom	The ship was wrecked at Killybegs, County Donegal. She was on a voyage from Liverpool to Limerick.
Nancy	United Kingdom	The ship foundered off Killybegs.
Neptune	France	The ship was driven ashore near "Pasarark", Prussia. She was on a voyage from Rochefort, Charente-Maritime to Danzig, Prussia.
Ovington	United Kingdom	The ship was wrecked on Euboea, Greece Her crew were rescued. She was on a voyage from Taganrog, Russia to Liverpool.
HMS Thais	Royal Navy	The Thais-class fireship departed from Halifax, Nova Scotia, British North America. No further trace, presumed foundered with the loss of all hands.

== 13 December ==
List of shipwrecks: 13 December 1833
Ship	State	Description
Edward	United Kingdom	The ship ran aground in the Mississippi River, United States.

== 14 December ==
List of shipwrecks: 14 December 1833
Ship	State	Description
Adelaide	United Kingdom	The ship was in collision with a Dutch galiot and foundered in the Atlantic Ocean between Cape Spartel and Cape Trafalgar, Spain. She was on a voyage from Liverpool, Lancashire to Constantinople, Ottoman Empire.

== 15 December ==
List of shipwrecks: 15 December 1833
Ship	State	Description
Mary Ann	United Kingdom	The ship sprang a leak and was beached in the River Wyre. She was on a voyage from Dundalk, County Louth to Lancaster, Lancashire.
Spring	United Kingdom	The ship foundered in the North Sea off the coast of Kent.
Superbe	French Navy	Superbe. The Téméraire-class ship of the line ran aground and was wrecked at Naoussa, Paros, Greece with the loss of nine of her 602 crew.

== 16 December ==
List of shipwrecks: 16 December 1833
Ship	State	Description
Branch	United Kingdom	The ship was wrecked on the Newcombe Sand, in the North Sea off the coast of Norfolk. Her crew were rescued. She was on a voyage from Sunderland, County Durham to Portsmouth, Hampshire.
Daphne	United Kingdom	The ship was wrecked on the Dutch coast with some loss of life. She was on a voyage from Sicily to Newcastle upon Tyne.
Falcon	United Kingdom	The brig was driven wrecked on the Apple-bed Reef, near Belfast, County Antrim with the loss of three lives.
Hazard	United Kingdom	The sloop was wrecked on the west coast of Tory Island, County Donegal. Her crew were rescued. She was on a voyage from Ballina, County Mayo to Runcorn, Cheshire.
Jane	United Kingdom	The ship was lost near Conwy, Caernarvonshire. Her crew were rescued. She was on a voyage from Cork to Liverpool, Lancashire.
Lady Shaw	United Kingdom	The ship was driven ashore near Ballywalter, County Down. She was on a voyage from Liverpool to Antigua. Lady Shaw was refloated on 24 December and taken in to Belfast.
Syren	United Kingdom	The brig was wrecked near Llanmadoc, Glamorgan. Her crew were rescued. She was on a voyage from Swansea, Glamorgan to Malta.

== 17 December ==
List of shipwrecks: 17 December 1833
Ship	State	Description
Ann Elizabeth	United States	The ship was wrecked at Gloucester, Massachusetts. She was on a voyage from Boston, Massachusetts to Saint John, New Brunswick, British North America.
Brandy Wine	United Kingdom	The ship was driven ashore at Spurn Point, Yorkshire. She was on a voyage from Cádiz, Spain to Hull, Yorkshire.
Canadian	United Kingdom	The ship foundered in the North Sea off the coast of Norfolk. Her crew were rescued. She was on a voyage from Newcastle upon Tyne, Northumberland to London.
Clyde	United Kingdom	The ship was wrecked on an island off Gatehouse of Fleet, Wigtownshire with the loss of her captain. She was on a voyage from Glasgow, Renfrewshire to Bristol, Gloucestershire.
Dois Irmaos	Portugal	The ship was wrecked near Lisbon.
Dolphin	United Kingdom	The ship was wrecked on the Cant Sands with the loss of a crew member. She was on a voyage from Faial, Azores, Portugal to London.
Elizabeth	United Kingdom	The ship was driven ashore and wrecked near Bideford, Devon. Her crew were rescued. She was on a voyage from Bengal, India to London.
European	United Kingdom	The ship sprang a leak and was abandoned. Her crew were rescued by David (United Kingdom).
Isabella	United Kingdom	The schooner was driven ashore at "Peile Foudrey". She was on a voyage from Ulverston, Cumberland to the Clyde.
Industry	(United Kingdom of Great Britain and Ireland) British North America	The ship sank at Philadelphia, Pennsylvania.
Jane	United Kingdom	The sloop was driven ashore near Sheephaven, County Donegal. She was on a voyage from Wick, Caithness to Sligo.
John	United Kingdom	The ship was driven ashore on Islay. She was on a voyage from Belfast, County Antrim to Sunderland, County Durham.
Lord Nelson	United Kingdom	The sloop was driven ashore at Spurn Point.
Morrin	United Kingdom	The ship was driven ashore on Spurn Point. She was on a voyage from Vyborg, Grand Duchy of Finland to Hull.
Norwich Packet	United Kingdom	The ship foundered in the North Sea 25 nautical miles (46 km) east north east of Whitby, Yorkshire. She was on a voyage from Great Yarmouth, Norfolk to Newcastle upon Tyne.
Ringdove	United Kingdom	The brig was wrecked at Noordwijk, South Holland. Her crew were rescued.
Sovereign	United Kingdom	The ship was driven ashore on Spurn Point. She was on a voyage from Great Yarmouth to Wakefield, Yorkshire.
Standard	United Kingdom	The ship was driven ashore on Saltholm, Denmark. She was on a voyage from Saint Petersburg, Russia to Liverpool, Lancashire.
Twins	United Kingdom	The ship was run down and sunk in the English Channel off Brighton, Sussex by Horatio (United Kingdom). She was on a voyage from Sunderland, County Durham to Falmouth, Cornwall.
Wesley	United Kingdom	The ship was driven ashore and severely damaged on the Mull of Galloway, Ayrshire. She was on a voyage from Onega, Russia to Bristol, Gloucestershire. Wesley was refloated on 28 December and taken in to Whitehaven, Cumberland.
Wortley	United Kingdom	The ship was driven ashore on Islay. Her crew were rescued. She was on a voyage from Dublin to Sligo.

== 18 December ==
List of shipwrecks: 18 December 1833
Ship	State	Description
Aboyne	United Kingdom	The ship struck the harbour bar and sank at Chichester, Sussex, arriving from Portsmouth, Hampshire.
Margaret	United Kingdom	The ship was wrecked on Bornholm, Denmark. Her crew were rescued. She was on a voyage from Riga, Russia to London.

== 19 December ==
List of shipwrecks: 19 December 1833
Ship	State	Description
Brothers	United Kingdom	The ship was wrecked in Carmarthen Bay. with the loss of all hands. She was on a voyage from Bahia, Brazil to Liverpool, Lancashire.
Economy	United Kingdom	The ship was driven ashore and severely damaged at Nidingen, Sweden. Her crew were rescued. She was on a voyage from Saint Petersburg, Russia to London. Economy floated off on 7 January 1834 and was taken in to "Skalla".
Elizabeth	United Kingdom	The ship was driven ashore and wrecked at Nidingen. She was on a voyage from Saint Petersburg to London.
Junge Tromp	Netherlands	The ship was driven ashore at "Malon". She was on a voyage from Riga, Russia to Amsterdam, North Holland.
Mervin	United Kingdom	The ship was driven ashore at Spurn Point, Yorkshire.
Pontiff	United States	The ship was wrecked on the Cat Keys. She was on a voyage from New Orleans, Louisiana to Havre de Grâce, Seine-Inférieure, France.
Saxony	United Kingdom	The ship was driven ashore at Weymouth, Dorset. Her crew were rescued. She was on a voyage from London to the Charente.
Sisters	United Kingdom	The ship capsized in the North Sea off Great Yarmouth, Norfolk. Her crew were rescued. She was on a voyage from Miramichi, New Brunswick, British North America to Sunderland, County Durham.
Ulrica	Stettin	The ship was driven ashore on Texel, North Holland, Netherlands. She was on a voyage from Stettin to Leith, Lothian, United Kingdom.
Uranus	Hamburg	The ship was abandoned off the Weser Lightship ( Bremen). She was towed in to Bremen on 22 December.
Water Witch	United Kingdom	The steamship was wrecked on the coast of County Wexford with the loss of four lives. She was on a voyage from Wexford to Bristol, Gloucestershire.

== 20 December ==
List of shipwrecks: 20 December 1833
Ship	State	Description
Euphemia	United Kingdom	The ship was wrecked at Chatham, Massachusetts, United States with the loss of three of her crew. She was on a voyage from Saint John, New Brunswick to Wexford.
Henry Brougham	United Kingdom	The brig was wrecked on Valentia Island, County Kerry with the loss of all hands. She was on a voyage from Quebec City, Lower Canada, British North America to Ross, County Wexford.
Priscilla	United Kingdom	The brig was wrecked on the West Burrows Sandbank with the loss of a crew member. She was on a voyage from Liverpool, Lancashire to London.

== 21 December ==
List of shipwrecks: 21 December 1833
Ship	State	Description
Eclipse	United Kingdom	The ship was wrecked on the Morant Keys She was on a voyage from Jamaica to Liverpool, Lancashire.
Elizabeth	United Kingdom	The ship sank in the River Severn. She was on a voyage from Worcester to Bristol, Gloucestershire.
Haabetsanker	Norway	The ship was wrecked near Boulogne-sur-Mer, Pas-de-Calais, France with the loss of all twelve crew. She was on a voyage from St. Ubes, Spain to Stavanger.
Leverix	Hamburg	The ship was driven ashore and wrecked at Cuxhaven.
Lorenz	Hamburg	The ship was driven ashore at Cuxhaven.
Louise Agathe	Netherlands	The brig was driven ashore at Cape Henlopen, Delaware, United States.
Mary Ann	United Kingdom	The ship was driven ashore in Swansea Bay She was on a voyage from Swansea, Glamorgan to St. John's, Newfoundland.
Mayflower	United Kingdom	The ship foundered in The Wash off Boston, Lincolnshire. Her crew were rescued. She was on a voyage from Goole, Yorkshire to Boston.
Perseverance	United Kingdom	The ship was driven ashore 15 nautical miles (28 km) east of Ostend, West Flanders, Belgium. She was on a voyage from London to Ostend.
Providence	United Kingdom	The ship was driven ashore in Swansea Bay. Her crew were rescued. She was on a voyage from Hayle, Cornwall to Swansea.
Salvatore	Kingdom of the Two Sicilies	The ship was wrecked at Berck, Pas-de-Calais with the loss of eleven of her fourteen crew. She was on a voyage from Palermo to London, United Kingdom.

== 22 December ==
List of shipwrecks: 22 December 1833
Ship	State	Description
Albion	United Kingdom	The ship was abandoned off Stoke Point, Devon. She subsequently came ashore there and was wrecked. Albion was on a voyage from Leith, Lothian to Lisbon, Portugal.
Atlas	United Kingdom	The ship was abandoned in the Atlantic Ocean with the loss of four of her crew. She was on a journey from Saint John, New Brunswick, British North America to Strangford Lough.
Crown	United Kingdom	The ship was wrecked near "Osteringer". She was on a voyage from Saint Petersburg, Russia to London.
John and Thomas	United Kingdom	The ship struck the Cannon Rock, in the Irish Sea, and was abandoned. She was subsequently towed in to Portaferry, County Down.
Sappho	United Kingdom	The ship was abandoned in the Atlantic Ocean 445 nautical miles (824 km) south east of Cape Cod, Massachusetts, United States. She was on a voyage from Saint John, New Brunswick, British North America to London.
Swift	United Kingdom	The ship was wrecked on the coast of Newfoundland, British North America. Her crew were rescued.

== 23 December ==
List of shipwrecks: 23 December 1833
Ship	State	Description
Advena	United Kingdom	The brig was abandoned in the North Sea. Her crew were rescued by Everhand ( Bremen). Advena was on a voyage from Sunderland, County Durham to Chatham, Kent.
Countess of Chichester	United Kingdom	The ship departed from Liverpool, Lancashire for Bonny, Nigeria. No further trace, presumed foundered with the loss of all hands.
Comet	United Kingdom	The ship was driven ashore at Pennington, Hampshire. She was on a voyage from Cádiz, Spain to Southampton, Hampshire.
Ellida	United Kingdom	The ship was wrecked on the Isle of Mull. She was on a voyage from "New Carleby" to Liverpool. Ellida was refloated on 2 January 1834.
Friends	United Kingdom	The ship was driven ashore and wrecked at Wells-next-the-Sea, Norfolk.

== 24 December ==
List of shipwrecks: 24 December 1833
Ship	State	Description
Jamaica	United Kingdom	The ship ran aground off Liverpool, Lancashire and was wrecked. She was on a voyage from Liverpool to Jamaica.
Windsor	United Kingdom	The ship was wrecked on the Kentish Knock, in the North Sea off the coast of Kent. Her crew survived.

== 25 December ==
List of shipwrecks: 25 December 1833
Ship	State	Description
Avina	United Kingdom	The ship foundered in the North Sea having previously been abandoned by her crew.
Sophia	United Kingdom	The ship departed from Pugwash, Nova Scotia, British North America for Liverpool, Lancashire. No furthert trace, presumed foundered with the loss of all hands.
Thetis	United Kingdom	The pilot boat was run down and sunk by the steamship Messenger (United Kingdom) in the English Channel off the Nab Lightship ( Trinity House). Her crew were rescued by Messenger.

== 26 December ==
List of shipwrecks: 26 December 1833
Ship	State	Description
Experiment	United Kingdom	The ship was driven ashore in Kinfinan Bay. She was on a voyage from Liverpool, Lancashire to Glasgow, Renfrewshire.
Experiment	United Kingdom	The ship was driven ashore in Loch Tyne. She was on a voyage from Liverpool to Glasgow.
Hopewell	United Kingdom	The ship foundered off Milford Haven, Pembrokeshire with the loss of all hands.
Hull Packet	United Kingdom	The ship was driven ashore and wrecked at Hastings, Sussex.
Onyx	United Kingdom	The ship was wrecked in the Bosphorus near "Chila", Ottoman Empire with the loss of all hands. She was on a voyage from Odesa, Russian Empire to Liverpool
Telemachus	United Kingdom	The ship was driven ashore and severely damaged at Hastings.
William	United Kingdom	The ship was wrecked on the Nap Sands. Her crew were rescued. She was on a voyage from Bristol, Gloucestershire to London.
Zante	Greece	The cutter sank at Trieste.

== 28 December ==
List of shipwrecks: 28 December 1833
Ship	State	Description
Diadem	United Kingdom	The ship was driven ashore at "the Koll". She was on a voyage from Saint Petersburg, Russia to London.
Entreprenant	France	The whaler was wrecked on Goree Island, South Holland, Netherlands.
Hull Packet	United Kingdom	The ship was wrecked at Hastings, Sussex.
Union	France	The ship was wrecked on the coast of Madagascar.
William Donald	United Kingdom	The ship ran aground on the Blackwater Bank, in the Irish Sea off the coast of County Wexford and was abandoned. She was on a voyage from Liverpool, Lancashire to Savannah, Georgia, United States. William Donald subsequently drove ashore in Saint Tudwal's Islands in mid-January and was wrecked.

== 29 December ==
List of shipwrecks: 29 December 1833
Ship	State	Description
Alliance	United Kingdom	The ship was driven ashore and wrecked near Wainfleet, Lincolnshire with the loss of all hands.
Heckington	United Kingdom	The ship was driven ashore and wrecked near Wainfleet with the loss of all hands.
Helen	United Kingdom	The brig was driven ashore and wrecked at Arisaig, Inverness-shire. Her crew were rescued. She was on a voyage from Westport, County Mayo to Hull, Yorkshire.
Juventus	United Kingdom	The ship was wrecked at Killybegs, County Donegal. She was on a voyage from the Clyde to Limerick.
Seaton Castle	United Kingdom	The ship was abandoned in the Atlantic Ocean. Her crew were rescued by Good Intent (United Kingdom). Seaton Castle was on a voyage from Liverpool to New York, United States.

== 30 December ==
List of shipwrecks: 30 December 1833
Ship	State	Description
Hero	United Kingdom	The sloop was driven ashore near Parkgate, Cheshire.
Jemima	United Kingdom	The ship was driven ashore on the south coast of Sicily.
Union	United Kingdom	The ship was driven ashore on the south coast of Sicily.

== 31 December ==
List of shipwrecks: 31 December 1833
Ship	State	Description
Alexander and Jenny	United Kingdom	The ship was driven ashore at Belfast, County Antrim. She was on a voyage from Wick, Caithness to Bristol, Gloucestershire.
Alice	United Kingdom	The sloop was driven ashore at Preston, Lancashire.
Anna Maria	Netherlands	The ship was driven ashore at Amsterdam, North Holland, She was later refloated.
Arethusa	United Kingdom	The ship was driven ashore in Cavan Byron Bay. She was on a voyage from Liverpool, Lancashire to Limerick.
Argo	United Kingdom	The ship was driven ashore at Sligo.
Auchmuty	United Kingdom	The ship was wrecked on Scroby Sands, in the North Sea off the coast of Norfolk with the loss of a crew member.
Aurora	United Kingdom	The ship was driven ashore and severely damaged at Douglas, Isle of Man. She was later refloated and taken in to the harbour for repairs. Aurora was on a voyage from Liverpool to Gloucester.
Barbullen	United Kingdom	The ship was driven ashore at Sligo.
Berwick-upon-Tweed	United Kingdom	The ship was wrecked on the Herd Sand, in the North Sea off South Shields, County Durham. She was on a voyage from Liverpool, Lancashire to South Shields.
Bolivar	United Kingdom	The ship was driven ashore at Sligo. She was refloated on 4 January 1834.
Canada	United Kingdom	The ship was driven ashore at Spurn Point, Yorkshire. She was on a voyage from Saint Petersburg, Russia to Hull, Yorkshire.
Catherina Juliana	Netherlands	The ship was driven ashore at Amsterdam. She was on a voyage from Amsterdam to Sète, Hérault, France. Catherina Juliana was refloated on 11 January 1834.
Catherine	United Kingdom	The brig was driven ashore at Lytham St Annes, Lancashire. Her crew survived.
Columbus	British East India Company	The East Indiaman was wrecked on Texel, North Holland, Netherlands with the loss of all on board. She was on a voyage from New York, United States to Bremen.
Dageraad	Netherlands	The ship was driven ashore at Amsterdam. She was on a voyage from Amsterdam to Surinam.
David	United Kingdom	The ship was wrecked on Scroby Sands with the loss of one of her four crew.
Diana	United Kingdom	The ship was driven ashore at Galway.
Diana	United Kingdom	The ship was driven ashore at Sligo. She was on a voyage from Glasgow to Ballina, County Mayo.
Eliza	United Kingdom	The sloop was driven ashore and wrecked at Preston.
Eliza	United Kingdom	The ship was driven ashore at Donegal.
Elizabeth	United Kingdom	The flat was driven ashore at Preston.
George	United Kingdom	The ship was wrecked on the Bransty Rocks, near Whitehaven, Cumberland. Her crew were rescued.
Grecian	United Kingdom	The ship foundered in Liverpool Bay with the loss of all hands. She was on a voyage from Liverpool to the Cape of Good Hope.
Handvies	Netherlands	The ship was driven ashore at Amsterdam.
Hindu	United Kingdom	The ship was driven ashore on Texel, North Holland.
Hopewell	United Kingdom	The sloop foundered in the Irish Sea off St. Gowans Head, Pembrokeshire.
John	United Kingdom	The ship was driven ashore at Sligo.
John	United Kingdom	The sloop was driven ashore at Preston.
John	United Kingdom	The ship was driven ashore at Belfast.
John and William	United Kingdom	The ship sank in Porthkerry Bay. She was refloated on 7 February 1834 and taken in to Barry, Glamorgan.
Josephine	United Kingdom	The ship was driven ashore at Ballyshannon, County Donegal.
Lady Douglas	United Kingdom	The ship was driven ashore at Pwllheli, Caernarvonshire. She was on a voyage from Sierra Leone to Liverpool.
Lark	United Kingdom	The ship was wrecked off Great Yarmouth, Norfolk. Her crew were rescued.
Lime Cobb	United Kingdom	The ship was driven ashore at Belfast.
Lucy	United Kingdom	The ship capsized in the Atlantic Ocean. ~Only two of her crew survived to be rescued on 18 January 1834 by William Thatcher (United Kingdom). Lucy was on a voyage from Saint John, New Brunswick, British North America to Padstow, Cornwall.
Margaret and Ann	United Kingdom	The ship was driven ashore at Galway. She was later refloated.
Maria	Netherlands	The ship was driven ashore at Amsterdam. She was on a voyage from amsterdam to Genoa, Kingdom of Sardinia.
Mary	United Kingdom	The ship ran aground on the Whiting Sand, in the North Sea and was abandoned by her crew. She was on a voyage from Saint Petersburg, Russia to London.
Mary	United Kingdom	The schooner was driven ashore at St Ernan's, County Donegal.
Mary Ann	United Kingdom	The ship was driven ashore at Belfast. She was on a voyage from Glasgow, Renfrewshire to Kirkcudbright.
Mary Fullerton	United Kingdom	The sloop was driven ashore at Donegal.
Mayflower	United Kingdom	The sloop was driven ashore at Ballyshannon.
Melina	United Kingdom	The ship was driven ashore and damaged at Galway. She was later refloated.
Mercurius	United Kingdom	The ship was driven ashore at Amsterdam. She was later refloated. Mercurius was on a voyage from Amsterdam to Porto, Portugal.
Pelican	United Kingdom	The ship was driven ashore near "the Dingle". She was on a voyage from Liverpool to Drogheda, County Louth.
Perseverance	United Kingdom	The ship was driven ashore at Sligo.
Royal Duke	(United Kingdom of Great Britain and Ireland) Isle of Man	The sloop was driven out of Derbyhaven in a gale. She was wrecked on the coast of Lancashire on 6 January 1834 with the loss of all hands.
Sally	United Kingdom	The ship was driven ashore at Belfast. She was on a voyage from Belfast to London.
Sarah	United Kingdom	The brig was driven ashore at Kirk Michael, Isle of Man. She was on a voyage from Tralee, County Kerry to Liverpool.
Sincerity	United Kingdom	The ship was abandoned in the North Sea off Great Yarmouth, Norfolk.
Sir Robert Barclay	United Kingdom	The ship was driven ashore in Donegal Bay. She was on a voyage from Donegal to London.
Stant Friesz	Netherlands	The ship was driven ashore at Amsterdam. She was on a voyage from Amsterdam to a Brazilian port.
Susan and Jane	United Kingdom	The ship was driven ashore at Donegal.
Syren	United Kingdom	The sloop foundered off Great Orme Head, Caernarvonshire with the loss of all hands.
Twey Gebroeder	Netherlands	The ship was driven ashore and severely damaged at Amsterdam. She was on a voyage from Amsterdam to La Rochelle, Charente-Maritime, France.
Ugonia	France	The ship was driven ashore near "the Dingle". She was on a voyage from Liverpool to Marseille, Bouches-du-Rhône.
Valiant	United Kingdom	The ship was driven ashore at Sligo.
Vriendschap	Netherlands	The ship was driven ashore at Amsterdfam. She was on a voyage from Amsterdam to King's Lynn, Norfolk.
Vrow Ikina	Netherlands	The ship was driven ashore at Amsterdam. She was on a voyage from Amsterdam to London.
Workington	United Kingdom	The ship foundered in the Atlantic Ocean off Sligo.
Zeemeuw	Netherlands	The ship was driven ashore at Amsterdam. She was on a voyage from Amsterdam to Surinam. Zeemeuw was refloated on 11 January 1834.
Zephyr	United Kingdom	The ship was driven ashore at Donegal.

== Unknown date ==
List of shipwrecks: Unknown date in December 1833
Ship	State	Description
Aimable Catherine	France	The ship was lost in the Adriatic Sea She was on a voyage from Trieste to Marseille, Bouches-du-Rhône.
Amiscad Habañera	Spain	The schooner was driven ashore on the Isle of Pines, Cuba by HMS Nimble (Royal Navy). Her crew subsequently destroyed her by explosives to prevent capture.
Ann	United Kingdom	The ship was driven ashore at Holywood, County Down before 10 December.
Anna Sophia	Sweden	The ship was driven ashore in Malbay. She was on a voyage from Stockholm to a Mediterranean port.
Ann Gerhardina	Netherlands	The ship was driven ashore near Boulogne, Pas-de-Calais, France. She was on a voyage from Amsterdam, North Holland to Havre de Grâce, Seine-Inférieure, France.
Aufang	flag unknown	The ship sprang a leak and foundered off Cape Palos, Spain. Her crew were rescued. She was on a voyage from Portsmouth, Hampshire to Messina, Sicily.
Carl Julius	Prussia	The ship was lost near Stige, Denmark. She was on a voyage from Königsberg to London, United Kingdom.
Carnation	United Kingdom	The ship sank in the Prince's Dock, Liverpool.
Catherine Ann	United Kingdom	The ship was driven ashore on Dragør, Denmark. She was on a voyage from Saint Petersburg, Russia to Hull, Yorkshire.
Charles	France	The ship was driven ashore and wrecked on Goree Island, South Holland, Netherlands.
Columbus	United States	The ship foundered with the loss of all hands. She was on a voyage from New York to Bremen.
Delaware	United States	The ship ran aground on the Brandywine Shoal, in the Delaware River. She was on a voyage from Liverpool to Philadelphia, Pennsylvania.
Earl Kilmorey	United Kingdom	The brig was wrecked on the Banks of Wicklow, in the Irish Sea. Her crew were rescued. She was on a voyage from Newry, County Down to London.
Elizabeth	United Kingdom	The ship was driven ashore near Milford Haven, Pembrokeshire. She wason a voyage from Maranhão, Brazil to Liverpool.
Emma	flag unknown	The ship was wrecked on the Vogel Sand, in the North Sea. Her crew were rescued.
Hazard	United Kingdom	The ship was wrecked on Tory Island, County Donegal. She was on a voyage from Ballina, County Mayo to Liverpool.
Helen	United Kingdom	The ship was wrecked on Miscou Island, Newfoundland, British North America. She was on a voyage from London to Quebec City, Lower Canada, British North America.
Hudscott	United Kingdom	The ship was driven ashore whilst on a voyage from Seville, Spain to Glasgow, Renfrewshire.
Jessie	United Kingdom	The ship was presumed lost on a voyage from "Spyland" to Liverpool.
Louney	Hamburg	The ship was wrecked on the Vogel Sand. She was on a voyage from Hamburg to Buenos Aires, Argentina.
Margaret	United Kingdom	The ship was driven ashore and wrecked at Nairn.
Mary	United Kingdom	The ship foundered in the Kattegat on or before 17 December.
Miriam	United Kingdom	The ship was abandoned in the North Sea. She was later taken in to King's Lynn, Norfolk.
Nancy	United Kingdom	The ship was wrecked in the Magdalen Islands, Lower Canada. She was on a voyage from the Restigouche River to Newport, Monmouthshire.
Nautilus	British East India Company	The Brig-of-War was wrecked on the west coast of the Red Sea. All on board were rescued.
Nemesis	United Kingdom	The brig was wrecked near Halifax, Nova Scotia, British North America. Her crew were rescued. She was on a voyage from Poole, Dorset to Saint Andrews, New Brunswick, British North America.
Neroline	Norway	The ship was driven ashore near Trieste. She was on a voyage from Trondheim to Trieste.
New Felix	United Kingdom	The ship was wrecked in the Saint Lawrence River. She was on a voyage from Liverpool to Montreal, Lower Canada.
Olive	United Kingdom	The ship departed from Ballina, County Mayo for the Clyde in late December. No further trace, presumed foundered with the loss of all hands.
Pictou	United Kingdom	The ship was driven ashore at Cardiff, Glamorgan. She was on a voyage from St. John's, Newfoundland, British North America to Waterford.
Providentia	Sweden	The ship was lost near Strömstad. She was on a voyage from Cádiz, Spain to Gothenburg.
Rover	United Kingdom	The ship was wrecked in Loch Indaal. She was on a voyage from Ayr to Wexford.
Sophia	United Kingdom	The ship was lost near "Waderoon". She was on a voyage from "New Carby" to Liverpool.
Susan	United Kingdom	The brig was abandoned in the Atlantic Ocean before 20 December. She was on a voyage from St. John's, Newfoundland to Philadelphia, Pennsylvania, United States.
Suzanne	United Kingdom	The ship was wrecked on the coast of Calabria. She was on a voyage from Trieste to Marseille, Bouches-du-Rhône.
Swan	United Kingdom	The sloop departed from Bideford, Devon for Bristol, Gloucestershire in early December. She subsequently foundered in the Bristol Channel off Lynmouth, Devon with the loss of all three crew.
Vrow Hendrika	Prussia	The ship was lost whilst on a voyage from Königsberg to Hull, Yorkshire, United Kingdom.
