= List of shipwrecks in January 1834 =

The list of shipwrecks in January 1834 includes ships sunk, foundered, wrecked, grounded or otherwise lost during January 1834.

== 1 January ==
List of shipwrecks: 1 January 1834
Ship	State	Description
Blessing	United Kingdom	The schooner was wrecked in Freshwater Bay.
Elizabeth	United Kingdom	The ship was driven ashore at Milford Haven, Pembrokeshire.
Johanna Juliana	Bremen	The ship was driven ashore and wrecked at the mouth of the Weser. She was on a voyage from Tenerife, Canary Islands, Spain to Bremen.
John	United Kingdom	The ship was driven ashore at Formby, Lancashire. Her crew were rescued. She was on a voyage from Liverpool, Lancashire to Belfast, County Antrim.
Medusa	United Kingdom	The ship foundered in the North Sea off Flamborough Head, Yorkshire. All ten people on board were rescued by Clyde (United Kingdom).
Vale of Clwyd	United Kingdom	The paddle steamer was scuttled at Liverpool. She was refloated the next day.
Water Witch	United Kingdom	The ship departed from São Miguel, Azores, Portugal for Liverpool. No further trace, presumed foundered with the loss of all hands.

== 2 January ==
List of shipwrecks: 2 January 1834
Ship	State	Description
Greenock	United Kingdom	The ship was driven ashore at Blyth, Northumberland.
Mercury	United Kingdom	The ship departed from Falmouth, Cornwall for São Miguel, Azores, Portugal, No further trace, presumed foundered with the loss of all hands.
Providence	United Kingdom	The ship was driven ashore near Wainfleet, Lincolnshire. Her crew were rescued. She was on a voyage from Wisbech, Cambridgeshire to Leeds, Yorkshire.

== 3 January ==
List of shipwrecks: 3 January 1834
Ship	State	Description
Forrester	Belgium	The ship was wrecked on the Kaloot Bank. She was on a voyage from Antwerp to Palermo, Sicily.
Ivanhoe	United Kingdom	The ship was driven ashore and wrecked at Savannah, Georgia, United States. Her crew were rescued. She was on a voyage from Antwerp to Savannah.
Robert and Mary	United Kingdom	The ship was driven ashore at Dundalk, County Louth. She was refloated on 21 February.

== 4 January ==
List of shipwrecks: 4 January 1834
Ship	State	Description
Agnes	United Kingdom	The ship was driven ashore in the River Shannon. She was on a voyage from Limerick to London.
Charlotte	United Kingdom	The ship was driven ashore on Terschelling, Friesland, Netherlands. Her crew were rescued. She was on a voyage from Newcastle upon Tyne, Northumberland to Waterford.
Cygnet	United Kingdom	The ship was driven ashore at Whitehaven, Cumberland.
Dolphin	United Kingdom	The ship was driven ashore at Brighton, Sussex. She was refloated but drove again and was wrecked. Her crew were rescued. Dolphin was on a voyage from Glasgow, Renfrewshire to Shoreham-by-Sea, Sussex.
Fanny	France	The ship was driven ashore at Noordwijk, South Holland, Netherlands. Her crew were rescued. She was on a voyage from Saint Petersburg to Bordeaux, Gironde.
Flora	Belgium	The ship was lost in the North Sea off Domburg, Zeeland, Netherlands. She was on a voyage from Riga, Russia to Antwerp
Forrester	United Kingdom	The ship was wrecked on the Kaloot Bank, in the North Sea.
George IV	United Kingdom	The ship ran aground on the Shipwash Sand, in the North Sea off the coast of Suffolk and was abandoned by her crew. She was on a voyage from St. Petersburg, Russia to London. Her cargo of tallow drove ashore on the coast of Jutland on 15 February.
Isabella	United Kingdom	The ship sprang a leak and foundered off the Giants Causeway, County Antrim. She was on a voyage from Liverpool to Portrush, County Antrim.
Isabella	United Kingdom	The brig was wrecked on the coast of Galloway. Her crew were rescued. She was on a voyage from the Clyde to County Clare.
Johanna	Sweden	The brig was driven ashore at Cuxhaven.
Liberty	United Kingdom	The ship ran aground on the Cross Sand, in the North Sea off the coast of Suffolk. Her crew were rescued.
Margaret	United Kingdom	The ship was driven ashore at Whitehaven. She was on a voyage from Whitehaven to Demerara. Margaret was refloated on 10 January and taken in to Whitehaven.
Mary	United Kingdom	The ship was abandoned in the North Sea 18 nautical miles (33 km) north east of Ostend, West Flanders, Belgium.
Ninus	Kingdom of Hanover	The ship was driven ashore at Cuxhaven. She was on a voyage from Batavia, Netherlands East Indies to Cuxhaven. Ninus was later refloated and taken in to Cuxhaven.
Three Brothers	United Kingdom	The ship was driven ashore on Texel, North Holland, Netherlands. She was on a voyage from Saint Petersburg, Russia to Topsham, Devon.
William	United Kingdom	The ship was wrecked at "Sku Point", Glamorgan with the loss of all hands. She was on a voyage from Bristol, Gloucestershire to London.

== 5 January ==
List of shipwrecks: 5 January 1834
Ship	State	Description
Cordelia	United States	The ship was wrecked on the Thumb Cap Shoal. All on board were rescued. She was on a voyage from Boston, Massachusetts to Halifax, Nova Scotia, British North America.
Kennington	United Kingdom	The ship was driven ashore at Holyhead, Anglesey. She was on a voyage from Savannah, Georgia to Liverpool, Lancashire.
Liberty	United Kingdom	The brig was wrecked on the Cross Sand, in the North Sea off the coast of Norfolk. Her crew were rescued by the Great Yarmouth Lifeboat.
Widow's Friend	United Kingdom	The ship was driven ashore at Holyhead. She was on a voyage from Wexford to Liverpool.
William Pitt	United Kingdom	The ship departed from Saint Andrews, New Brunswick for Gloucester. No further trace, presumed foundered with the loss of all hands.

== 6 January ==
For the loss of the sloop Royal Duke on this day, see the entry for 31 December 1833.

List of shipwrecks: 6 January 1834
Ship	State	Description
Navigation	United Kingdom	The ship was wrecked on the Gunfleet Sand, in the North Sea off the coast of Essex. Her crew were rescued. She was on a voyage from South Shields, County Durham to London.

== 7 January ==
List of shipwrecks: 7 January 1834
Ship	State	Description
Jessie	United Kingdom	The ship was struck by lightning in the Atlantic Ocean. She was abandoned two days later; her crew were rescued by Harbinger (United Kingdom). Jessie was on a voyage from London to New Providence, New Jersey, United States. The wreck drove ashore on Groix, Morbihan, France on 5 February.
Kensington	United Kingdom	The ship was driven ashore near Holyhead, Anglesey. Her crew were rescued. She was on a voyage from Savannah, Georgia, United States to Liverpool, Lancashire.
Rebecca	United Kingdom	The ship was lost on the Bondicar Rock, Northumberland. Her crew were rescued. She was on a voyage from Sunderland, County Durham to Aberdeen.
Watt	United Kingdom	The ship foundered in the Irish Sea off Pwllheli, Caernarvonshire. She was on a voyage from Liverpool to an African port.
Widows' Friend	United Kingdom	The ship was driven ashore near Holyhead. She was on a voyage from Wexford to Liverpool.

== 8 January ==
List of shipwrecks: 8 January 1834
Ship	State	Description
Edgar	United Kingdom	The ship was driven ashore in St Tudwals Islands, County Donegal. She was on a voyage from Liverpool, Lancashire to Havana, Cuba.
Holland	United Kingdom	The ship was driven ashore at Sunderland, County Durham.

== 9 January ==
List of shipwrecks: 9 January 1834
Ship	State	Description
Active	United Kingdom	The ship was wrecked on the coast of the Isle of Man with the loss of a crew member. She was on a voyage from Dublin to Whitehaven, Cumberland.
Hero	(United Kingdom of Great Britain and Ireland) Jersey	The ship was lost on Scroby Sands, in the North Sea off the coast of Norfolk. Her crew were rescued. She was on a voyage from Hamburg to Jersey.
Kitty and Ann	United Kingdom	The ship was driven ashore at Dublin. She was on a voyage from Dublin to Carlingford, County Louth.
Oliver	France	The ship was wrecked in the Gabon River.

== 10 January ==
List of shipwrecks: 10 January 1834
Ship	State	Description
Derwent	United Kingdom	The ship was holed by her anchor and sank at South Shields, County Durham.
Hannah	United Kingdom	The ship was wrecked on Bald Head Island, North Carolina, United States. Her crew were rescued. She was on a voyage from Wilmington, Delaware, United States to Liverpool, Lancashire.
St. Nicolai	Russia	The ship was wrecked on the Aswick Skerries, Shetland Islands, United Kingdom with the loss of eight of her ten crew. She was on a voyage from Saint Petersburg to Liverpool, Lancashire, United Kingdom.

== 11 January ==
List of shipwrecks: 11 January 1834
Ship	State	Description
Desirée	France	The ship was wrecked at Penmarc'h, Finistère. Her crew were rescued. She was on a voyage from La Rochelle, Charente-Maritime to Saint-Valery-sur-Somme, Somme.
Levington	United Kingdom	The ship foundered in the Atlantic Ocean off San Martiño, Cíes Islands, Spain. She was on a voyage from Liverpool, Lancashire to Gibraltar.
Nestor	United States	The brig was beached at Aith Voe, Shetland Islands, United Kingdom. She was on a voyage from Copenhagen, Denmark to Lisbon, Portugal.
Oak	United Kingdom	The ship was wrecked near Portmahomack, Ross-shire.
Telegraph	United Kingdom	The ship sank in the North Sea off Blakeney, Norfolk. Her crew were rescued. She was on a voyage from King's Lynn, Norfolk to London.
Vrow Dreunke	Netherlands	The ship was driven ashore at Aldeburgh, Suffolk, United Kingdom. She was on a voyage from Workum, Friesland to London.
William	United Kingdom	The cutter was wrecked at Grenada.

== 12 January ==
List of shipwrecks: 12 January 1834
Ship	State	Description
Amand Desire	France	The ship was driven ashore at Ramsgate, Kent, United Kingdom with the loss of a crew member. She was on a voyage from Dunkerque, Nord to Saint-Valery-sur-Somme, Somme.
Belfast	United Kingdom	The steamship was driven ashore east of Calais, France. All on board were rescued. She was on a voyage from London to Calais. Belfast was refloated on 15 January.
George and William	United Kingdom	The ship was driven ashore and wrecked on the north coast of Guernsey, Channel Islands with the loss of all but two of her crew. She was on a voyage from Jamaica to London.
Isabella	United Kingdom	The ship sprang a leak and foundered in the Irish Sea off Dunseverick, County Antrim. Her crew were rescued. She was on a voyage from Liverpool, Lancashire to Portrush, County Antrim.
Tre Damer	Denmark	The ship was wrecked on the Herd Sand, in the North Sea off the coast of County Durham, United Kingdom. Her crew of nineteen were rescued by the South Shields Lifeboat.
Trial	United Kingdom	The barque was abandoned in the Atlantic Ocean (49°11′N 23°15′W). Her crew were rescued by the brig Margaret (United Kingdom). Trial was on a voyage from Saint Andrews, New Brunswick, British North America to London. She drove ashore at Skibbereen, County Cork on 30 January and was plundered by the local inhabitants.

== 13 January ==
List of shipwrecks: 13 January 1834
Ship	State	Description
Europa	United Kingdom	The ship was wrecked in Ross Bay. She was on a voyage from Bahia, Brazil to Liverpool, Lancashire.
Königsberg	Prussia	The ship was wrecked near Plymouth, Devon, United Kingdom. Her crew were rescued. She was on a voyage from Memel to London.
Lealtad	Spanish Navy	The fifth-rate frigate was driven ashore and wrecked near Santander. Her crew were rescued.
Mary Jane	United States	The ship was lost near "Port Piswick". Her crew were rescued. She was on a voyage from Boston, Massachusetts to Halifax, Nova Scotia, British North America.
Romulus	Denmark	The ship was sunk by ice off "Urbana". She was on a voyage from Frederiksberg to Halifax, Nova Scotia, British North America.
Thomas Warham	United Kingdom	The ship was wrecked on Corton Sand, in the North Sea off the coast of Suffolk. Her crew were rescued. She was on a voyage from Newcastle upon Tyne, Northumberland to London.

== 14 January ==
List of shipwrecks: 14 January 1834
Ship	State	Description
Brilliant	United Kingdom	The smack was driven ashore and wrecked on Holy Isle, Firth of Clyde. She was on a voyage from Glasgow, Renfrewshire to Liverpool, Lancashire.
General Hand	United States	The ship was driven ashore and wrecked at Charleston, South Carolina. She was on a voyage from New Orleans, Louisiana to Marseille, Bouches-du-Rhône, France.
Gustave	France	The ship was wrecked on the Île Pelée. Her crew were rescued. She was on a voyage from Havre de Grâce, Seine-Inférieure to Martinique.
Jonge Pieter	Netherlands	The ship was wrecked on the Haaks Sandbank, in the North Sea. She was on a voyage from Ostend, West Flanders, Belgium to Amsterdam, North Holland.
Peace	United Kingdom	The ship was driven ashore at Fort William, Inverness-shire. She was o a voyage from Newport, Monmouthshire to Fisherrow, Lothian.

== 15 January ==
List of shipwrecks: 15 January 1834
Ship	State	Description
Clarence	United Kingdom	The ship departed from Jérémie, Haiti for Cowes, Isle of Wight. No further trace, presumed foundered with the loss of all hands.
Jane and Mary	United Kingdom	The ship was wrecked on The Skerries, Anglesey with the loss of all hands. She was on a voyage from Liverpool, Lancashire to Cork.
Linnæus	United Kingdom	The ship was wrecked in Gansbaai, southern Africa. Her crew were rescued. She was on a voyage from Liverpool, Lancashire to Bombay, India.
Rival	United Kingdom	The brig was abandoned in the Atlantic Ocean (47°40′N 7°36′W). All on board were rescued by HMS Firebrand (Royal Navy). Rival was on a voyage from Liverpool, Lancashire to Charleston, South Carolina, United States.
San José	Spain	The ship was wrecked near "Hole-in-the-Wall". She was on a voyage from La Orotava, Canary Islands to Havana, Cuba.
Saxony	United Kingdom	The ship was wrecked at Weymouth, Dorset. She was on a voyage from London to the Charente.

== 16 January ==
List of shipwrecks: 16 January 1834
Ship	State	Description
Elizabeth	United Kingdom	The ship was wrecked near Coleraine, County Antrim. Her crew were rescued. She was on a voyuage from Liverpool, Lancashire to the Isle of Skye.
Fair Helen	United Kingdom	The ship was driven ashore in Luce Bay. She was on a voyage from Liverpool to Bahia, Brazil. She beoke up on 31 January.
Mary Ann	United Kingdom	The ship was driven ashore near Plymouth, Devon. Her crew were rescued.
William Hamilton	United Kingdom	The ship was wrecked at Lymington, Hampshire with the loss of a crew member. She was on a voyage from Sierra Leone to London.

== 17 January ==
List of shipwrecks: 17 January 1834
Ship	State	Description
Effort	United Kingdom	The ship was abandoned in the Atlantic Ocean. Her crew were rescued by Morea (United States). She was on a voyage from a port in New Brunswick, British North America to Liverpool, Lancashire. Effort was discovered in the Irish Sea on 15 February and was towed in to Milford Haven, Pembrokeshire by HMRC Cheerful ( Board of Customs).
James	United Kingdom	The ship was lost in the Atlantic Ocean off Sline Head, County Galway with the loss of all hands. She was on a voyage from the Clyde to Galway.
John Stewart	United Kingdom	The ship was wrecked on the Cobbler's Rocks, Barbados. Her crew were rescued. She was on a voyage from Demerara to London.
Mountaineer	United States	The brig foundered in the Atlantic Ocean off Sline Head with the loss of all hands.
Rover	United Kingdom	The ship was lost off Newfoundland with the loss of two of her crew.
William and Anne	United Kingdom	The ship was driven ashore on the Norfolk coast. She was on a voyage from Wisbech, Cambridgeshire to London.

== 18 January ==
List of shipwrecks: 18 January 1834
Ship	State	Description
Echo	United Kingdom	The cutter was wrecked in Galley Bay, Antigua.
James	United Kingdom	The ship was driven ashore at Dover, Kent. She was refloated on 20 January and taken in to Dover.
Kingfisher	United Kingdom	The ship was driven ashore at Newquay, Cornwall.
Wilhelm en Jane	Netherlands	The ship was driven ashore on one of Saint Tudwal's Islands, Caernarvonshire, United Kingdom. She was on a voyage from Liverpool, Lancashire, United Kingdom to Amsterdam, North Holland.

== 19 January ==
List of shipwrecks: 19 January 1834
Ship	State	Description
Harriet	United Kingdom	The ship was driven ashore at Wells-next-the-Sea, Norfolk.
Utility	United Kingdom	The ship was driven ashore and wrecked at Castletown, Isle of Man.

== 21 January ==
List of shipwrecks: 21 January 1834
Ship	State	Description
Ridley	United Kingdom	The brig was wrecked on the Whiting Sand, in the North Sea off the coast of Suffolk. She was on a voyage from Stockton-on-Tees, County Durham to London.
Shubenacadie	Brazil	The ship was wrecked in the Saltee Islands, County Wexford, United Kingdom. Her crew were rescued. She was on a voyage from Aracati to Liverpool, Lancashire, United Kingdom.

== 23 January ==
List of shipwrecks: 23 January 1834
Ship	State	Description
Conrad	Bremen	The brig was wrecked near Rye, Sussex, United Kingdom with the loss of four of her eleven crew. She was on a voyage from Batavia, Netherlands East Indies to Rotterdam, South Holland, Netherlands.
Coriolanus	United Kingdom	The ship was driven ashore near Étaples, Pas-de-Calais, France. She was on a voyage from Demerara to London.
Dunbarton Castle	United Kingdom	The ship was driven ashore near "Portavid". She was eventually refloated, arriving at Sligo on 2 September. Dunbarton Castle was on a voyage from Norway to Ballyshannon, County Sligo.

== 24 January ==
List of shipwrecks: 24 January 1834
Ship	State	Description
Accession	United Kingdom	The ship was wrecked on Papa Westray, Shetland Islands. Her crew were rescued. She was on a voyage from Narva, Russia to Liverpool, Lancashire.
Dronning Maria	flag unknown	The ship was wrecked on Eierland, North Holland, Netherlands. She was on a voyage from "Prestoe" to Douglas, Isle of Man.
Pioneer	United Kingdom	The brig was driven ashore and wrecked at Rye, Sussex with the loss of a crew member. She was on a voyage from Great Yarmouth, Norfolk to Venice, Kingdom of Lombardy–Venetia. Pioneer was refloated and taken in to Rye on 7 February.

== 25 January ==
List of shipwrecks: 25 January 1834
Ship	State	Description
Arcadian	United Kingdom	The ship was wrecked on the Long Rocks, in the Irish Sea off Donaghadee, County Down.
Broadstairs	United Kingdom	The ship capsized and sank at a Sierra Leone port.
Hannah and Joseph	United Kingdom	The ship was driven ashore at "Sunderland". She was on a voyage from Newry, County Antrim to Preston, Lancashire.
United Kingdom	United Kingdom	The ship sank at the mouth of the River Shannon. She was on a voyage from Galway to London.

== 26 January ==
List of shipwrecks: 26 January 1834
Ship	State	Description
Yeoman	United Kingdom	The sloop was abandoned at sea. Her crew were rescued by a British vessel.

== 28 January ==
List of shipwrecks: 28 January 1834
Ship	State	Description
Brothers	United Kingdom	The ship was driven ashore and wrecked at Macduff, Aberdeenshire. with the loss of her captain. She was on a voyage from Banff, Aberdeenshire to London.
Diligence	United Kingdom	The ship was wrecked on the Herd Sand, in the North Sea off the coast of County Durham with the loss of a crew member. She was on a voyage from Leith, Lothian to South Shields, County Durham.
Dunbarton Castle	United Kingdom	The ship was wrecked near Ballyshannon, County Donegal. She was on a voyage from a Norwegian port to Sligo.
Friends	United Kingdom	The ship was driven ashore at Pakefield, Suffolk. Her crew were rescued. She was on a voyage from Memel, Prussia to Plymouth, Devon.
Gratitude	United Kingdom	The ship foundered in the North Sea off Lowestoft, Suffolk. Her crew were rescued.
Industrious Farmer	United Kingdom	The ship was driven ashore at Horsey, Norfolk. Her crew were rescued. She was on a voyage from Great Yarmouth, Norfolk to Whitby, Yorkshire.
Louisa	Sweden	The ship was driven ashore at Dunkerque, Nord, France. She was on a voyage from London to Lisbon, Portugal. She was refloated on 28 February.
Mary Russell	United Kingdom	The ship was driven ashore and wrecked at Horsey. Her crew were rescued. She was on a voyage from London to Newcastle upon Tyne, Northumberland.
Oliver	United Kingdom	The brig was driven ashore and wrecked at Horsey with the loss of all hands.
Patriot	United Kingdom	The ship was driven ashore and wrecked near Mundesley, Norfolk. Her crew were rescued. She was on a voyage from Spalding, Lincolnshire to Leeds, Yorkshire.

== 29 January ==
List of shipwrecks: 29 January 1834
Ship	State	Description
Alliance	United Kingdom	The ship was wrecked near Wainfleet, Lincolnshire with theloss of all hands.
Flora	United Kingdom	The ship was beached at Margate, Kent. She was on a voyage from Newcastle upon Tyne, Northumberland to Arundel, Sussex.
Heckington	United Kingdom	The ship was wrecked near Wainfleet with the loss of all hands.
Little Mary	United Kingdom	The ship was driven ashore and wrecked on Heligoland. Her crew were rescued.
Trim	United Kingdom	The ship was wrecked at Lowestoft, Suffolk.

== 30 January ==
List of shipwrecks: 30 January 1834
Ship	State	Description
Argyle	United Kingdom	The brig was wrecked on the Blackwater Bank, in the Irish Sea off County Wexford. Her crew were rescued. She was on a voyage from Demerara to Dublin.
Argus	United Kingdom	The ship was in collision with Henry Mackenzie (United Kingdom) and foundered in the Mediterranean Sea off Marbella, Spain. Her crew were rescued.
Equestrian	United Kingdom	The ship was wrecked on the Shipwash Sand, in the North Sea off the coast of Essex. Her crew were rescued. She was on a voyage from Charleston, South Carolina, United States to London.
John and William	United Kingdom	The ship struck a rock in Porthkerry Bay and sank. Her crew were rescued. She was on a voyage from St Clears, Carmarthenshire to Bristol, Gloucestershire.
Providence	United Kingdom	The ship was wrecked on the Barnard Sand, in the North Sea off the coast of Norfolk.
Robert	(United Kingdom of Great Britain and Ireland) British North America	The ship was lost near Bilbao, Spain. Her crew were rescued.
Waterloo	United Kingdom	The ship was driven ashore at Brancaster, Norfolk.

== 31 January ==
List of shipwrecks: 31 January 1834
Ship	State	Description
Amanthea	United Kingdom	The ship was destroyed by fire in the Delaware River, United States. She was on a voyage from Philadelphia, Pennsylvania to London.
Mary Ann	United Kingdom	The ship was driven ashore near Wexford.
Matilda	United Kingdom	The schooner brig was driven ashore at Stavanger, Norway.

== Unknown date ==
List of shipwrecks: Unknown date in January 1834
Ship	State	Description
Abeona	(United Kingdom of Great Britain and Ireland) New South Wales	The ship was wrecked at Port Macquarie.
Addingham	United Kingdom	The ship was driven ashore and damaged at Mauritius.
Alfred	France	The ship foundered off "Carjador". She was on a voyage from Marseille, Bouches-du-Rhône to Almería, Spain.
Ann	United Kingdom	The ship was wrecked on "Eartholmes". She was on a voyage from Saint Petersburg, Russia to Leith, Lothian.
Ann and Elizabeth	United Kingdom	The ship was abandoned in the North Sea. She was later towed in to Harwich, Essex.
Anthony	United Kingdom	The ship was driven ashore and damaged at Mauritius.
Apparence	France	The ship was wrecked at Almería.
Bencoolen	United Kingdom	The ship was driven ashore and damaged at Mauritius.
Brandy Wine	United States	The ship foundered in the Atlantic Ocean off the coast of Chincoteague, Virginia. She was on a voyage from Sicily to New York.
Brusselaei or Brusyelaer	Belgium	The ship sprang a leak and was abandoned off Belle Île, Finistère, France before 23 January. Her crew were rescued by Azie (France).
Ceres	United Kingdom	The ship was driven ashore and damaged at Mauritius.
Courier de Bourbon	France	The ship was wrecked at the Isle de France, Mauritius between 19 and 22 January.
Cupido	United Kingdom	The ship was driven ashore near Berwick upon Tweed, Northumberland. She was on a voyage from Gothenburg, Sweden to Grangemouth, Stirlingshire.
Dove	United Kingdom	The ship foundered in the English Channel off St. Albans Head, Dorset with the loss of four of her crew. She was on a voyage from Penzance, Cornwall to Southampton, Hampshire.
Drumore	United Kingdom	The ship was driven ashore and damaged at Mauritius.
Elizabeth	(United Kingdom of Great Britain and Ireland) British North America	The ship was wrecked at Shoe Cove, Newfoundland on or before 13 January. Her crew were rescued. She was on a voyage from Antigonish, Nova Scotia to St John's, Newfoundland.
Eleanore	United Kingdom	The ship was driven ashore and damaged at Mauritius.
Eliza Jane	United Kingdom	The ship was driven ashore and severely damaged at Mauritius.
Etton	Spain	The ship was wrecked on the Arklow Banks, in the Irish Sea. Her crew were rescued. She was on a voyage from Cádiz to Dublin, United Kingdom.
Fanney	United Kingdom	The ship was driven ashore and wrecked near Mundesley, Norfolk. She was on a voyage from Spalding, Lincolnshire to Leeds, Yorkshire.
Félicité Renouvelle	France	The ship was wrecked in the Gulf of Volos. She was on a voyage from Marseille, Bouches-du-Rhône to Salonica, Greece.
Felix	France	The ship was wrecked at the mouth of the Rhône.
Friendly	United Kingdom	The ship was wrecked near Great Yarmouth, Norfolk. She was on a voyage from Memel, Prussia to Plymouth, Devon.
Heron	United Kingdom	The ship was wrecked in Killala Bay. She was on a voyage from Ballina, County Mayo to Liverpool.
Hope	United Kingdom	The ship was driven ashore in Bootle Bay.
Jamaica	United Kingdom	The ship foundered in Liverpool Bay. She was on a voyage from Liverpool to Jamaica.
Jemima	United Kingdom	The ship foundered in the Mediterranean Sea off Cape Passero, Sicily. Her crew were rescued.
John	United Kingdom	The ship was driven ashore at Formby, Lancashire.
Josephine	France	The ship was wrecked.
La Voltigeante	France	The ship was wrecked off Capraia, Grand Duchy of Tuscany on or before 7 January. All thirteen people on board were rescued.
Mary Ann	United Kingdom	The ship was driven ashore at Burnham Overy Staithe, Norfolk. She was on a voyage from Boston, Lincolnshire to Burnham Overy Staithe.
Mary Ann	United Kingdom	The ship departed from Hull in early January for Ulverston, Lancashire. No further trace, presumed foundered with the loss of all hands.
Minerva	United Kingdom	The ship foundered in the North Sea off Herne Bay, Kent. She was refloated on 22 January and beached at Whitstable, Kent.
Nidelvin	flag unknown	The brig foundered off the coast of Cornwall before 22 January.
Nouvelle Ste. Anne	France	The ship was wrecked on the "Vignettes".
Pearl	United Kingdom	The ship was driven ashore and damaged at Mauritius.
Penelope	United Kingdom	The ship was scuttled on the Maplin Sand, in the North Sea off the coast of Essex. She was refloated on 18 January and beached at Whitstable.
Portland	United States	The brig was abandoned in the Atlantic Ocean.
Quevedo	United Kingdom	The ship was wrecked at the mouth of the River Shannon. Her crew were rescued. She was on a voyage from Limerick to London.
Rachel and Jane	United Kingdom	The ship foundered in the Atlantic Ocean on or before 15 January. She was on a voyage from São Miguel, Azores, Portugal to Glasgow, Renfrewshire.
Rosina	United Kingdom	The ship was wrecked on the coast of the Isle of Man before 20 January with the loss of two of her crew. She was on a voyage from Chester, Cheshire to Cork.
Royal George	United Kingdom	The ship was driven ashore and damaged at Mauritius.
Sarah	United Kingdom	The ship was abandoned in the North Sea off Lowestoft.
Semitry or Symmetry	United Kingdom	The barque was abandoned in the Atlantic Ocean (37°00′N 46°00′W). All 60 people on board were rescued by the brig Pericles (United Kingdom). Semitry was on a voyage from Liverpool to New York.
Six Sorkende	flag unknown	The ship was wrecked in the "Islands of Stormskar".
Skeen	United Kingdom	The ship was driven ashore and damaged at Mauritius.
Stair Stewart	United Kingdom	The ship foundered in the Irish Sea off the coast of Cumberland. She was on a voyage from Limerick to Liverpool.
St. Johannes	Netherlands	The ship was abandoned in the North Sea.
Traveller	United Kingdom	The ship was wrecked ear "Mandoney". She was on a voyage from Newcastle upon Tyne, Northumberland to the Charente.
Trois Amis	France	The ship was wrecked on the "Point of Partisson".
Union	United Kingdom	The ship foundered in the Mediterranean Sea off Cape Passero. Her crew were rescued.
Vesper	United Kingdom	The ship was driven ashore and damaged at Mauritius.
Waterloo	(United Kingdom of Great Britain and Ireland) New South Wales	The schooner was driven ashore in Cloudy Bay, South Island, New Zealand. Her crew survived but the vessel was subsequently burnt by the local inhabitants.
Wellington	United Kingdom	The ship foundered in the Atlantic Ocean off Boston, Massachusetts, United States with the loss of three of her crew. She was on a voyage from Boston to Cork.
Wharf	United Kingdom	The ship was driven ashore on Scharhörn. She was on a voyage from Goole, Yorkshire to Hamburg.
