= Plum Point =

Plum Point may refer to:

- Plum Point, Virginia, United States
- Plum Point, Newfoundland and Labrador, Canada
- Plum Point (Frank), 1963 painting by Jane Frank
- Plum Point Energy Station, a coal-fired power plant in Arkansas
