= Bascule =

A bascule is a counterbalanced structure (i.e. a lever) having one end that rises as the other lowers. It may also refer to:

- Bascule bridge, a moveable bridge with a counterweight that continuously balances the span in providing clearance for boat traffic
- Bascule (horse), the arc a horse's body takes as it goes over a jump
- Bascule light, a small navigational aid popular in Denmark up to the 18th century
- Cecal bascule, a cause of large bowel obstruction
- Teeterboard, a circus apparatus
- Bascule the Teller, a character from the 1994 Iain M. Banks novel Feersum Endjinn
