= Nidingen =

Nature reserve in Kungsbacka Municipality, Sweden

Nidingen lighthouse Nidingen
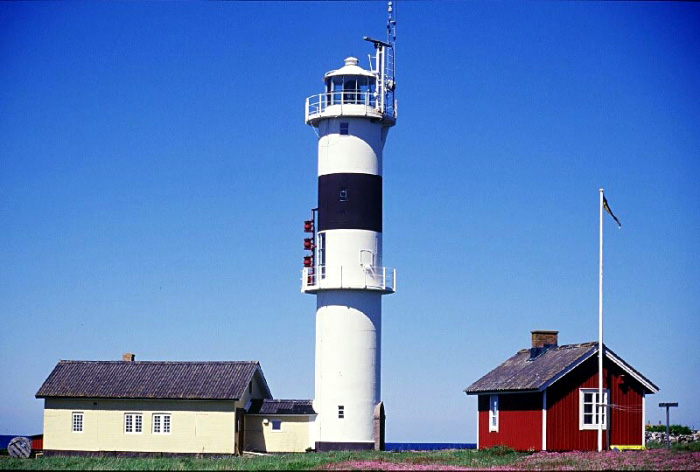
- Location: Nidingen, Kungsbacka Municipality, Sweden
- Coordinates: 57°18′9″N 11°54′2″E

Tower
- Constructed: 17th century (open fires) 1834 (twin towers) 1945 (new tower)
- Construction: reinforced concrete
- Automated: 1979
- Height: 23,5 meters
- Shape: round concrete tower
- Markings: white, black belt
- Power source: electricity
- Operator: Swedish Maritime Administration (Sjöfartsverket)
- Fog signal: (2) 30s

Light
- First lit: 17th century
- Focal height: 25,4 meters
- Lens: 3rd order dioptric Fresnel lens
- Range: 22 nautical miles
- Characteristic: Fl(1+2) WR 27s
- Sweden no.: SV-7443
- Nidingen twin lighthouses
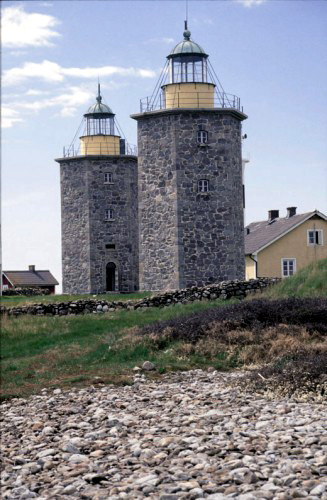
- Constructed: 1832
- Construction: natural stone
- Height: 19 m (62 ft)
- Markings: grey
- Power source: bituminous coal, rapeseed oil, kerosene
- Heritage: governmental listed building
- First lit: December 1834
- Deactivated: 1946
- Focal height: 20.4 m (67 ft)
- Lens: third order Fresnel lens (1846–)
- Characteristic: Exting (1946–)

Nidingen is a Swedish Kattegat sea area skerry with a lighthouse station. It is located in Onsala parish in Kungsbacka Municipality in the province (landskap) of Halland. The island has with its surrounding reefs always posed a danger to shipping. The three lighthouses on the island, one of which is active, are today protected as heritage buildings. The island is also a nature reserve with a birding station and hostel, famous for large populations of different bird species.

The province of Halland and Nidingen was ruled by Denmark until the Second Treaty of Brömsebro 1645. The Danes had lit primitive navigation fires on the island before, and also built a "vippefyr", but now it became one of Sweden's earliest light stations. In the 18th century, the vippefyr was replaced by fires placed on stone cairns, which in turn were replaced by two new stone towers in 1834. They were built even higher in 1847 and were equipped with lanterns and fresnel lenses. In 1884, the colza oil lamps were replaced by kerosene lamps with improved luminosity. The historic lighthouses was in use until 1946 when a new modern tower was completed. The lighthouse was electrified through a connection with cable from the mainland.

In the 1960s, the lighthouse's lens equipment was electrified. In 1973, an automatic rotation of the lens was installed around the clock while the lighting of the lamps was controlled by photocells. From the turn of the year 1978–79, Nidingen lighthouse became fully automated and unmanned. It was reported several times in the 2000s that the lighthouse could be deactivated when it was no longer considered necessary for shipping, but it remained in use. In 2019 it was reported that the Swedish Maritime Administration, Sjöfartsverket, plans to convert it to be powered by solar cells.

Wind observations from Nidingen is reported daily in SMHI Shipping Forecasts.
