= Cresset =

Metal cup or basket used as a beacon

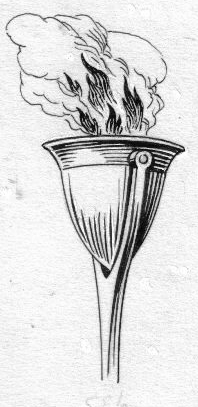
A cresset

A cresset is a metal cup or basket, often mounted to or suspended from a pole, containing oil, pitch, a rope steeped in rosin or something flammable. They are burned as a light or beacon.

== Background ==
Cressets mounted on the walls of Renaissance palaces in Italy were the first form of street lighting.

The term can also refer to a lamp where the wick burns in a cup or cavity, which can be of ceramic or stone. An account of the monastical church of Durham, written in 1593, says " Also there is standinge in the south pillar of the Quire doore of the Lanthorne, in a corner of the said pillar, a four-squared STONN, which hath been finely wrought, in every square a large fine Image, whereon did stand a four- square stone above that, which had twelve cressetts wrought in that stone, which was filled with tallow, and everye night one of them was lighted, when the day was gone, and did burn to give light to the monks at midnight, when they came to mattens."

== Gallery ==
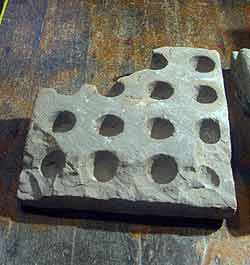
16-cup cresset stone from Calder Abbey, Cumberland.

== See also ==
- Fire basket
