= Cecal bascule =

Cecal bascule is a cause of large bowel obstruction where there is folding of the cecum anteriorly over the ascending colon. It is one of two types of cecal volvulus, the other being axial ileocolic. It is caused by rotational torsion of the cecum or ascending colon along its own axis. In cecal bascule, the base of the cecum folds anteriorly over the ascending colon, creating a flap-valve, obstructing emptying of the cecum. The condition can be complicated by necrosis or organ perforation before the diagnosis is made, particularly if the ileocecal valve is competent, preventing retrograde decompression of the cecum into the ileum.
