= Bascule light =

Lighthouse using a basket holding a fire

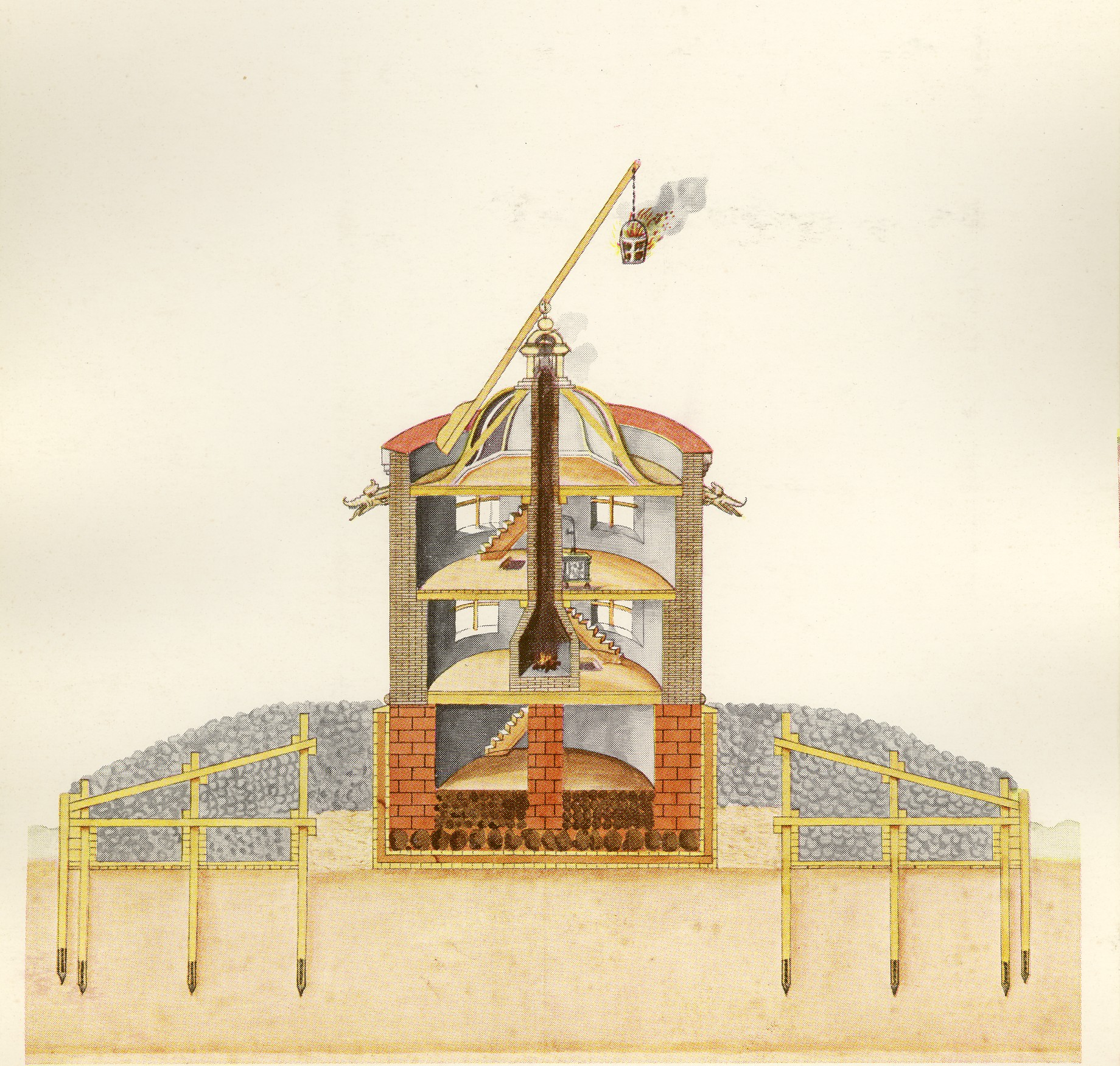
Ole Judichær's 1701 proposal for a tower topped by a vippefyr (tipping light).

A bascule light or tipping lantern (Danish: Vippefyr) was a type of small navigational aid popular in Denmark in the 18th century and before. It consisted of a basket in which wood or coal was set; this was then burned. The basket was affixed to a bascule that allowed it to be manipulated as required. (The bascule – from the French for "seesaw" – refers to the counterbalancing of the lever, which facilitates raising and lowering the basket; when one end is lowered the other is raised.) The vippefyr system was generally viewed as ineffective, as it produced little light and was usually unreliable.

== Background ==
In 1560 Frederick II of Denmark ordered the erection of beacons at Skagen, Anholt and Kullen Lighthouse to mark the main route through Danish waters from the North Sea to the Baltic. The current vippefyr at Skagen is a reproduction of the original, which dates back to 1626, preceding Frederick's decree. The design dates to 1624 and Jens Pedersen Groves. The lighthouse was originally built and funded by the Danish state with the proceeds of the Sound Dues for the use of the "Øresund", which King Eric of Pomerania introduced in 1429 and which remained in effect until 1857. In 1577, the Danish astronomer Tycho Brahe became the lighthouse administrator at Kullen, a position he held until his death in 1601.

The vippefyrs at Skagen, Anholt and Kullen were not the only such lights. For instance, in 1705 the Danish postal service established a bascule light on the island of Bågø in the Little Belt on the mail route Assens-Årøsund. The photo at left is a replica light built at Verdens Ende, Norway. It is located on the southernmost tip of Tjøme, an island on the west side of the entrance to Oslofjord.

== Gallery ==
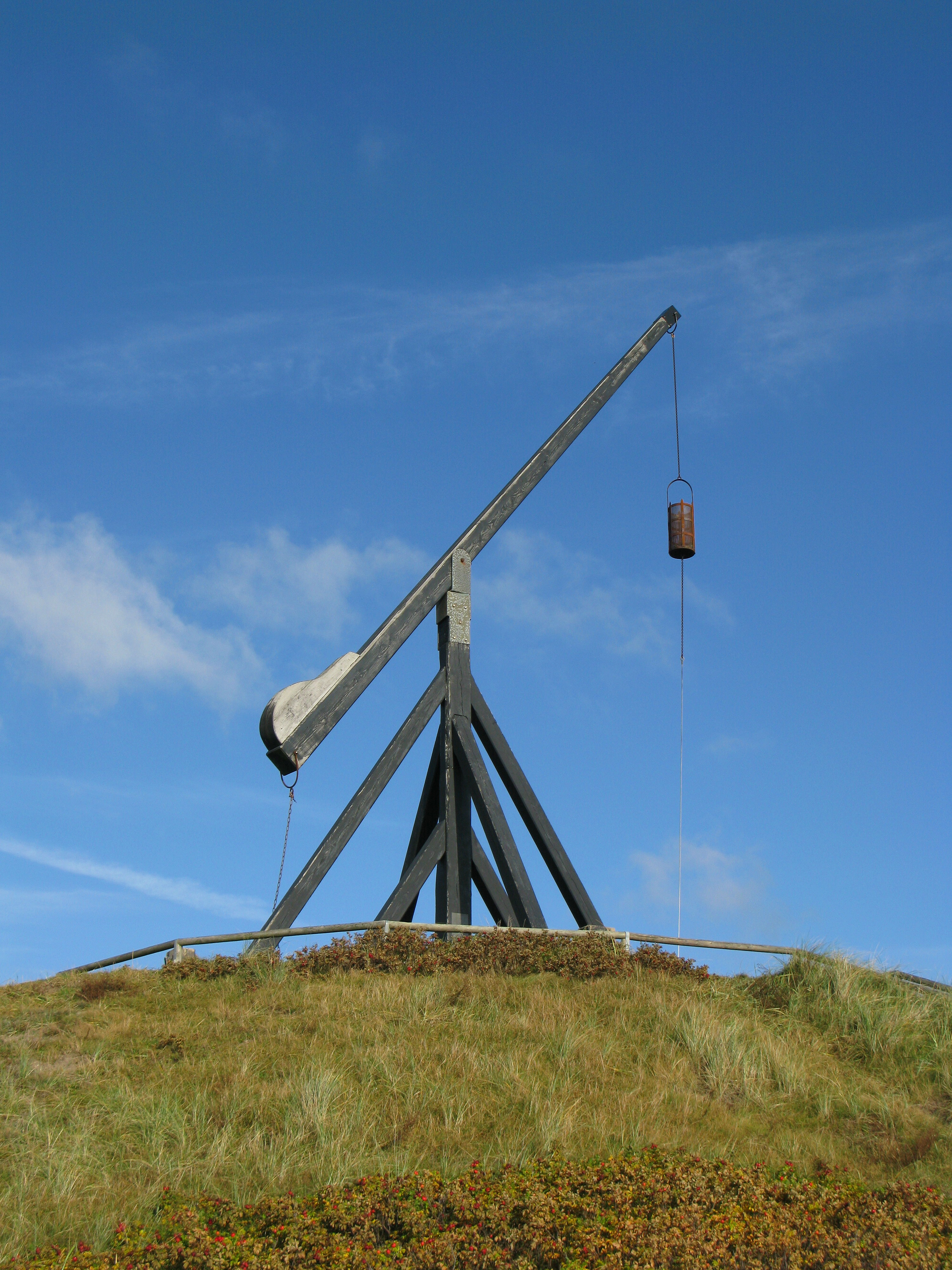
Vippefyr, Skagen, Denmark. The vippefyr is a reconstruction of the original vippefyr which was built in 1626

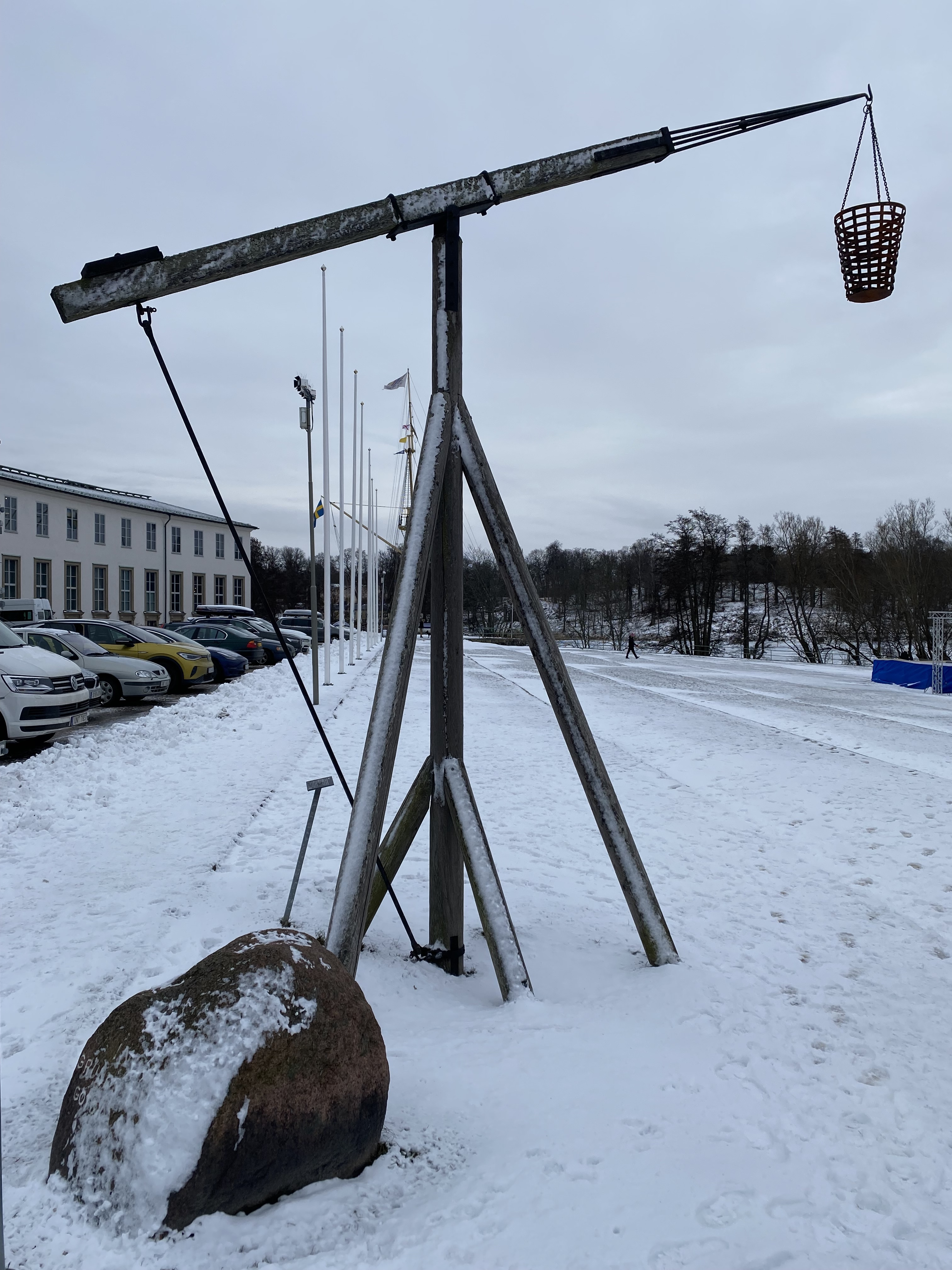
A vippfyr on Gärdet in Stockholm, 2022

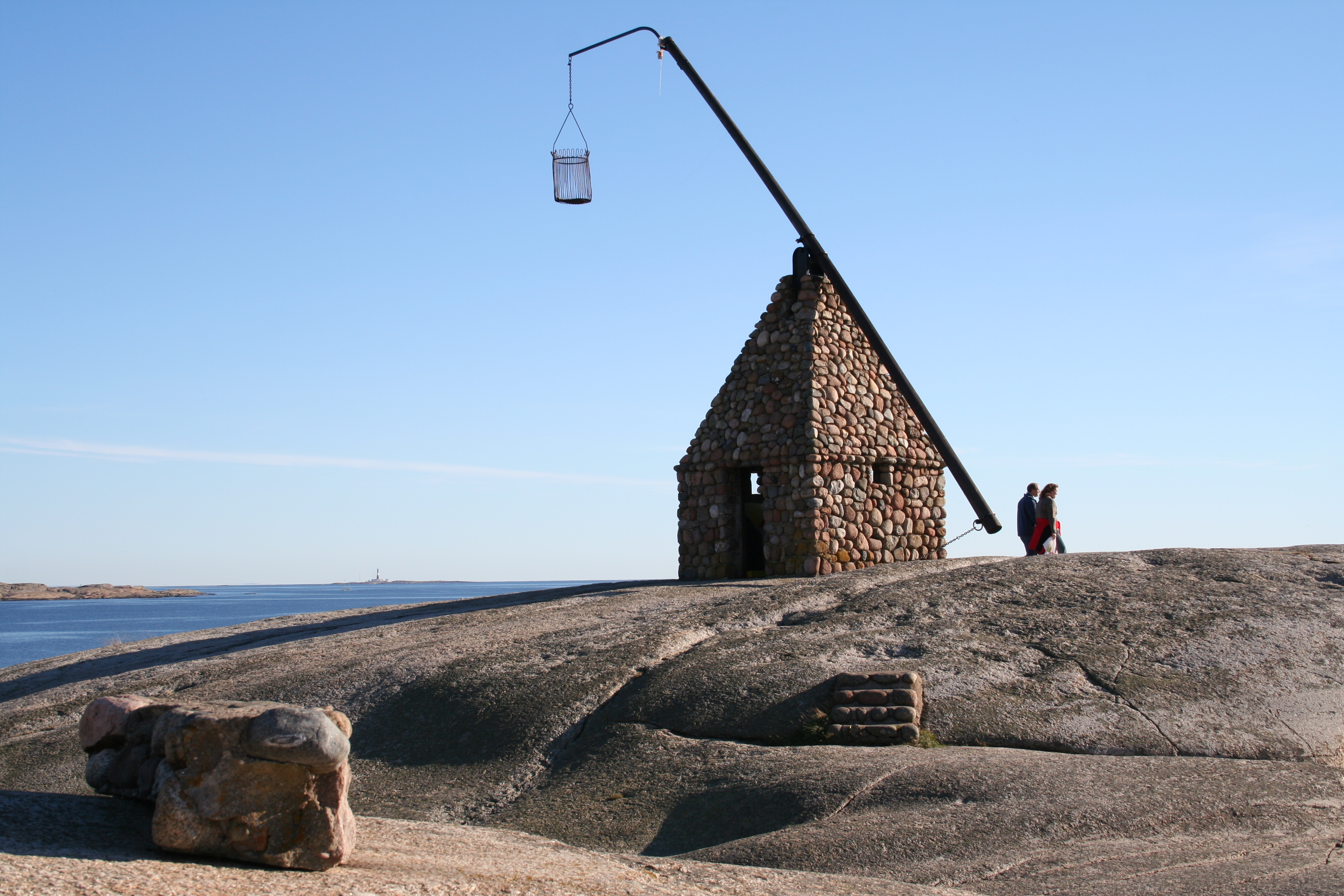
Verdens Ende Light (Replica)
