= Skagen's White Lighthouse =

Skagen's White Lighthouse Det Hvide Fyr i Skagen
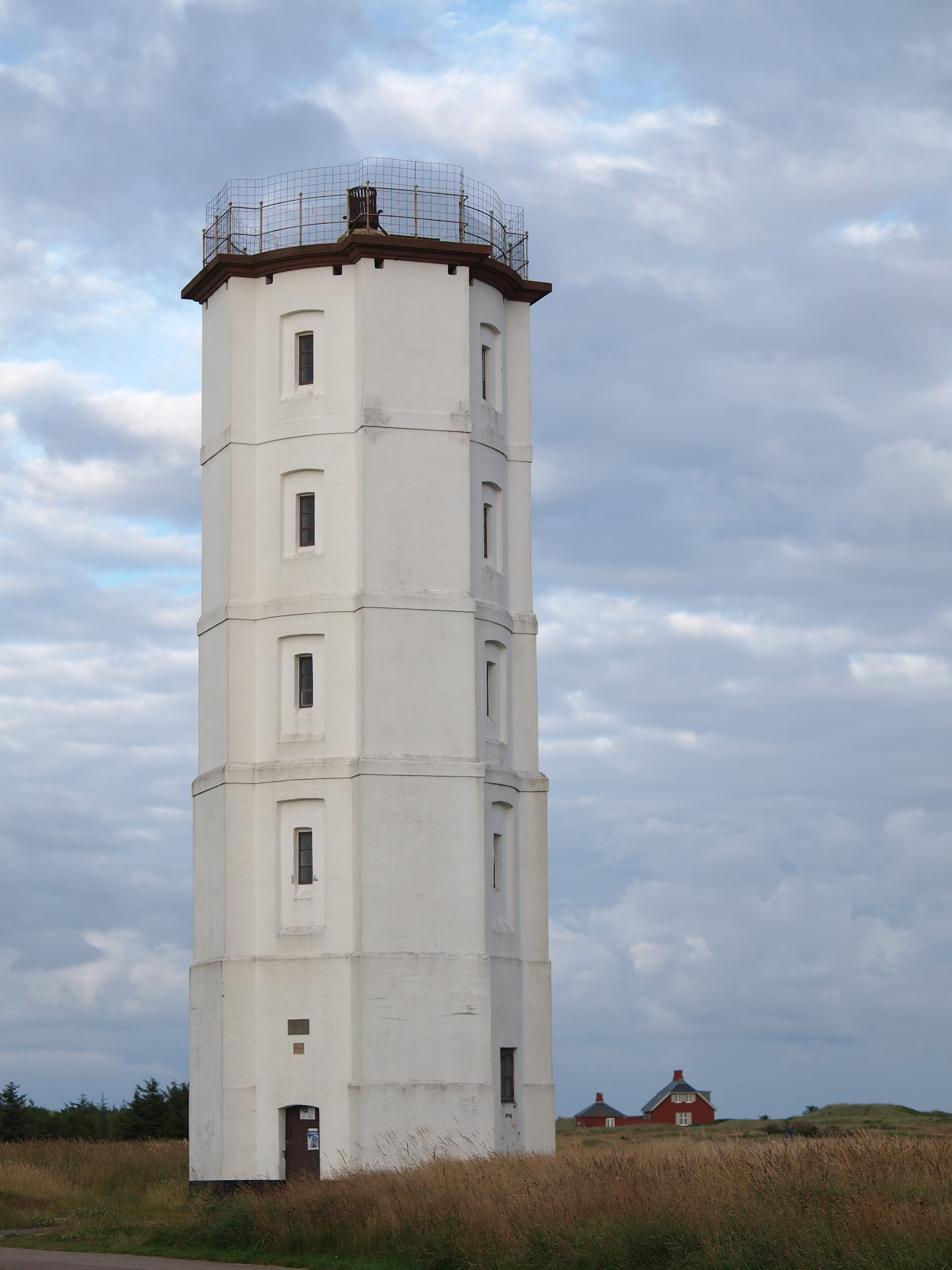
- Skagen's White Lighthouse from 1747
- Location: Skagen, Frederikshavn Municipality, Denmark
- Coordinates: 57.729057°N 10.606825°E

Tower
- Constructed: 1747
- Construction: brick tower
- Height: 21 metres (69 ft)
- Shape: octagonal prism with balcony, lantern removed
- Markings: white tower, black balcony
- Heritage: monument on Kulturstyrelsen register

Light
- Deactivated: 1858
- Focal height: 31 m (102 ft)
- Range: 17 nmi (31 km; 20 mi) (white), 12 nmi (22 km; 14 mi) (red)
- Characteristic: Fl(3) WR 10s

Skagen's White Lighthouse (Danish: Det Hvide Fyr i Skagen) is a historic lighthouse just north of the town of Skagen in the far north of Jutland, Denmark. It was operational from 1747 to 1858 when it was replaced by Skagen Lighthouse.

== History ==
Designed by Philip de Lange, it was the first lighthouse in Denmark to be built of brick. The octagonal tower, initially in raw red brick, was whitewashed at the beginning of the 19th century. With a height of 21 m (69 ft), it is located at the junction of Fyrvej and Batterivej. The lighthouse was originally coal fired, the coal being hauled up through an internal shaft and placed in a fire basket. In 1835, rapeseed oil replaced the coal and the lighthouse was fitted with a parabolic mirror. In 1858, the White Lighthouse was replaced by the Grey Lighthouse which was located 2 km further north on Skagen Odde. From 1871, the White Lighthouse was used as a signaling station to warn sailors of ice or of missing lightships.

== Exhibition venue ==
The White Lighthouse is now used as a venue for exhibitions. It can be booked from Frederikshavn Municipality.

== See also ==
- Skagen's Vippefyr
- List of lighthouses and lightvessels in Denmark
