= Lever =

Simple machine consisting of a beam pivoted at a fixed hinge

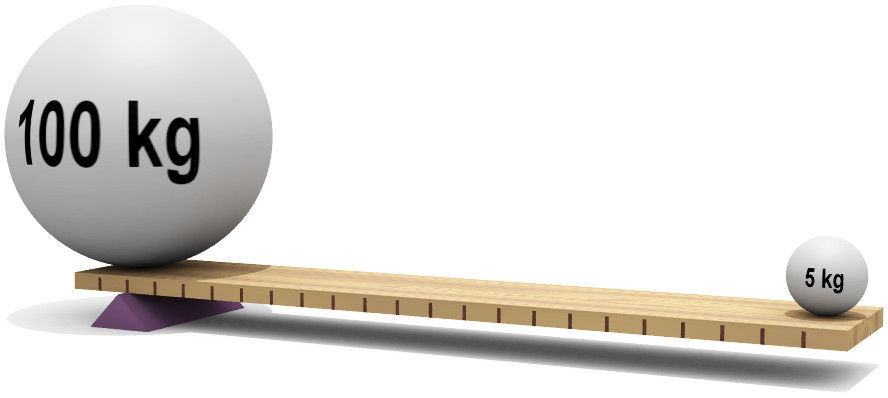
- Levers can be used to exert a large force over a small distance at one end by exerting only a small force (effort) over a greater distance at the other.
- Classification: Simple machine
- Components: fulcrum or pivot, load and effort
- Examples: see-saw, bottle opener, etc.

A lever is a simple machine consisting of a beam or rigid rod pivoted at a fixed hinge or fulcrum. A lever is a rigid body capable of rotating on a point on itself. On the basis of the locations of fulcrum, load, and effort, the lever is divided into three types. It is one of the six simple machines identified by Renaissance scientists. A lever amplifies an input force to provide a greater output force, which is said to provide leverage, which is mechanical advantage gained in the system, equal to the ratio of the output force to the input force. As such, the lever is a mechanical advantage device, trading off force against movement.

== Etymology ==
The word "lever" entered English around 1300 from Old French: levier. This sprang from the stem of the verb lever, meaning "to raise". The verb, in turn, goes back to Latin: levare, itself from the adjective levis, meaning "light" (as in "not heavy"). The word's primary origin is the Proto-Indo-European stem leg^{wh}-, meaning "light", "easy", or "nimble", among other things. The PIE stem also gave rise to the English-language antonym of "heavy", "light".

== Lever history ==
Autumn Stanley argues that the digging stick can be considered the first lever, which would position prehistoric women as the inventors of lever technology. The next earliest known cultural evidence of the application of the lever mechanism dates back to the ancient Egypt c. 5000 BC, when it was used in a simple balance scale. In ancient Egypt c. 4400 BC, a foot pedal was used for the earliest horizontal frame loom. In Mesopotamia (modern Iraq) c. 3000 BC, the shadouf, a crane-like device that uses a lever mechanism, was invented. In ancient Egypt, workmen used the lever to move and uplift obelisks weighing more than 100 tons. This is evident from the recesses in the large blocks and the handling bosses that could not be used for any purpose other than for levers.

The earliest remaining writings regarding levers date from the third century BC and were provided, by common belief, by the Greek mathematician Archimedes, who famously stated "Give me a lever (long enough and a fulcrum on which to place it), and I shall move the world". (The Greek usually attributed to Archimedes does not include details about length of lever or fulcrum, i.e., δῶς μοι πᾶ στῶ καὶ τὰν γᾶν κινάσω .) That statement has given rise to the phrase "an Archimedean lever" being adopted for use in many instances, not just regarding mechanics, including abstract concepts about the successful effect of a human behavior or action intended to achieve results that could not have occurred without it.

== Force and levers ==
A lever in balance

A lever is a beam connected to ground by a hinge, or pivot, called a fulcrum. The ideal lever does not dissipate or store energy, which means there is no friction in the hinge or bending in the beam. In this case, the power into the lever equals the power out, and the ratio of output to input force is given by the ratio of the distances from the fulcrum to the points of application of these forces. This is known as the law of the lever.

The mechanical advantage of a lever can be determined by considering the balance of moments or torque, T, about the fulcrum. If the distance traveled is greater, then the output force is lessened.

$$\begin{align}
T_{1} &= F_{1}a,\quad \\
T_{2} &= F_{2}b\!
\end{align}$$

where F_{1} is the input force to the lever and F_{2} is the output force. The distances a and b are the perpendicular distances between the forces and the fulcrum.

Since the moments of torque must be balanced, $T_{1} = T_{2} \!$. So, $F_{1}a = F_{2}b \!$.

The mechanical advantage of a lever is the ratio of output force to input force.

$$MA = \frac{F_{2}}{F_{1}} = \frac{a}{b}.\!$$

This relationship shows that the mechanical advantage can be computed from ratio of the distances from the fulcrum to where the input and output forces are applied to the lever, assuming a weightless lever and no losses due to friction, flexibility, or wear. This remains true even though the "horizontal" distance (perpendicular to the pull of gravity) of both a and b change (diminish) as the lever changes to any position away from the horizontal.

== Types of levers ==
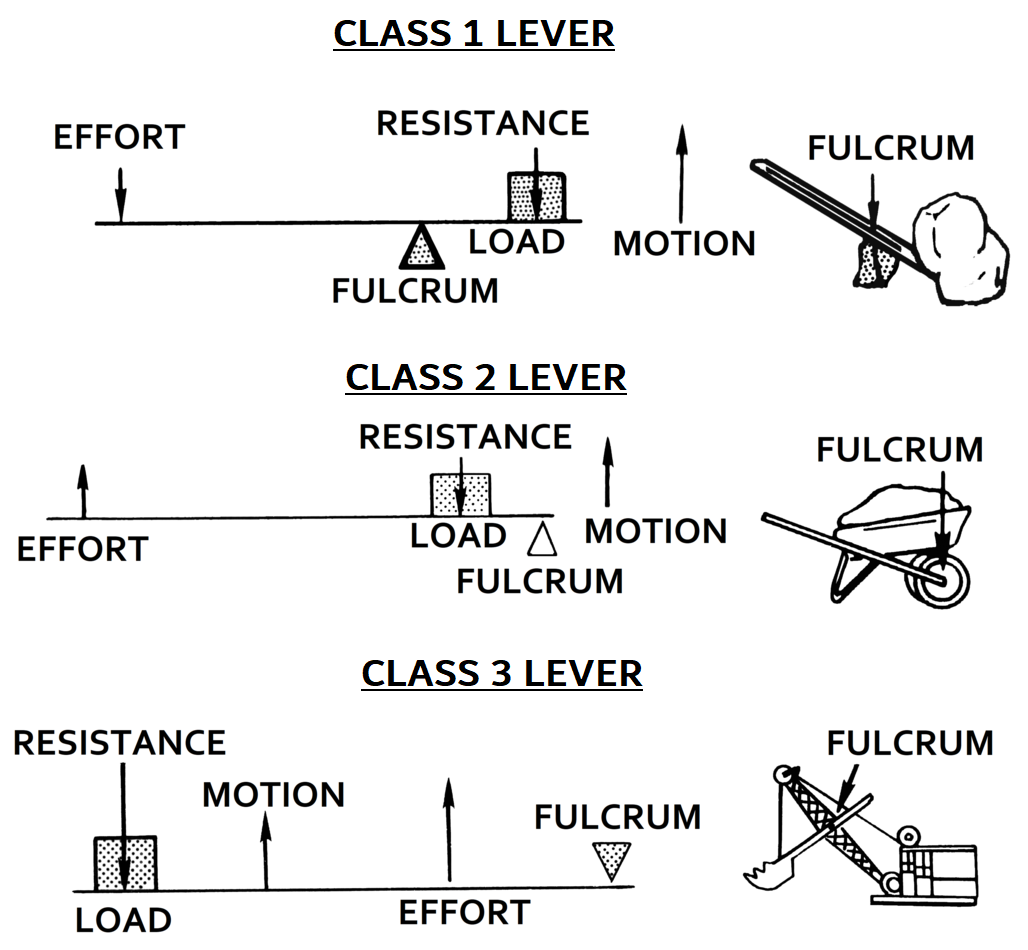
Three classes of levers

The three classifications of levers with examples of the human body.

Levers are classified by the relative positions of the fulcrum, effort, and resistance (or load). It is common to call the input force "effort" and the output force "load" or "resistance". This allows the identification of three classes of levers by the relative locations of the fulcrum, the resistance and the effort:

- Class I – Fulcrum is located between the effort and the resistance: The effort is applied on one side of the fulcrum and the resistance (or load) on the other side. For example, a seesaw, a crowbar, a pair of scissors, a balance scale, a pair of pliers, and a claw hammer (pulling a nail). With the fulcrum in the middle, the lever's mechanical advantage may be greater than, less than, or even equal to 1.
- Class II – Resistance (or load) is located between the effort and the fulcrum: The effort is applied on one side of the resistance and the fulcrum is located on the other side, e.g. a wheelbarrow, a nutcracker, a bottle opener, a wrench, a pair of bellows, and the brake pedal of a car. Since the load arm is smaller than the effort arm, the lever's mechanical advantage is always greater than 1. It is also called a force multiplier lever.
- Class III – Effort is located between the resistance and the fulcrum: The resistance (or load) is applied on one side of the effort and the fulcrum is located on the other side, e.g. a hoe, a pair of tweezers, a hammer, a pair of tongs, a fishing rod, and the mandible of a human skull. Since the effort arm is smaller than the load arm, the lever's mechanical advantage is always less than 1. It is also called a speed multiplier lever.

These cases are described by the mnemonic fre 123 where the f fulcrum is between r and e for the 1st class lever, the r resistance is between f and e for the 2nd class lever, and the e effort is between f and r for the 3rd class lever.

== Compound lever ==
A compound lever in a nail clipper

A compound lever comprises several levers acting in series: the resistance from one lever in a system of levers acts as effort for the next, and thus the applied force is transferred from one lever to the next. Examples of compound levers include scales, nail clippers, and piano keys.

The malleus, incus, and stapes are small bones in the middle ear, connected as compound levers, that transfer sound waves from the eardrum to the oval window of the cochlea.

== Law of the lever ==
The lever is a bar that pivots on a point or hinge (fulcrum) attached to a fixed point. The lever operates by applying forces at different distances from the fulcrum, or a pivot.

As the lever rotates around the fulcrum, points farther from this pivot move faster than points closer to the pivot. Therefore, a force applied to a point farther from the pivot must be less than the force located at a point closer in, because power is the product of force and velocity, and the power on both sides is equal.

If a and b are distances from the fulcrum to points A and B and the force F_{A} applied to A is the input and the force F_{B} applied at B is the output, the ratio of the velocities of points A and B is given by a/b, so the ratio of the output force to the input force, or mechanical advantage, is given by:
$$MA = \frac{F_B}{F_A} = \frac{a}{b}.$$

This is the law of the lever, as discussed by Archimedes. It shows that if the distance a from the fulcrum to where the input force is applied (point A) is greater than the distance b from fulcrum to where the output force is applied (point B), then the lever amplifies the input force. On the other hand, if the distance a from the fulcrum to the input force is less than the distance b from the fulcrum to the output force, then the lever reduces the input force.

The use of velocity in the static analysis of a lever is an application of the principle of virtual work.

== Virtual work and the law of the lever ==
A lever is modeled as a rigid bar connected to a ground frame by a hinged joint called a fulcrum. The lever is operated by applying an input force F_{A} at a point A located by the coordinate vector r_{A} on the bar. The lever then exerts an output force F_{B} at the point B located by r_{B}. The rotation of the lever about the fulcrum P is defined by the rotation angle θ in radians.

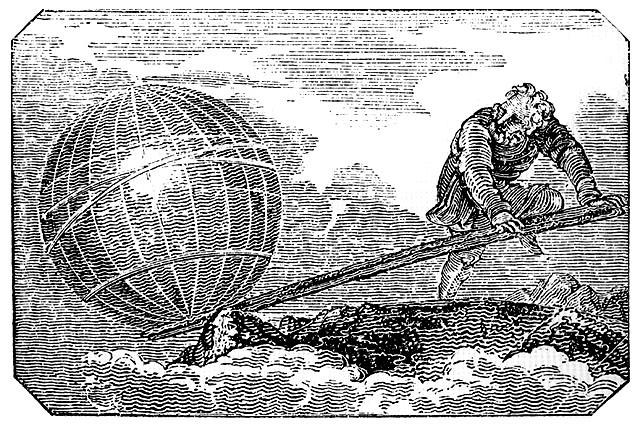
Archimedes lever, Engraving from Mechanics Magazine, published in London in 1824

Let the coordinate vector of the point P that defines the fulcrum be r_{P}, and introduce the lengths

$$a = |\mathbf{r}_A -  \mathbf{r}_P|, \quad  b = |\mathbf{r}_B -  \mathbf{r}_P|,$$

which are the distances from the fulcrum to the input point A and to the output point B, respectively.

Now introduce the unit vectors e_{A} and e_{B} from the fulcrum to the point A and B, so

$$\mathbf{r}_A  -  \mathbf{r}_P = a\mathbf{e}_A, \quad \mathbf{r}_B -  \mathbf{r}_P = b\mathbf{e}_B.$$

The velocity of the points A and B are obtained as

$$\mathbf{v}_A = \dot{\theta} a \mathbf{e}_A^\perp, \quad  \mathbf{v}_B = \dot{\theta} b \mathbf{e}_B^\perp,$$

where e_{A}^{⊥} and e_{B}^{⊥} are unit vectors perpendicular to e_{A} and e_{B}, respectively.

The angle θ is the generalized coordinate that defines the configuration of the lever, and the generalized force associated with this coordinate is given by

$$F_\theta =  \mathbf{F}_A \cdot \frac{\partial\mathbf{v}_A}{\partial\dot{\theta}} - \mathbf{F}_B \cdot \frac{\partial\mathbf{v}_B}{\partial\dot{\theta}}= a(\mathbf{F}_A \cdot \mathbf{e}_A^\perp) - b(\mathbf{F}_B \cdot \mathbf{e}_B^\perp) = a F_A - b F_B ,$$

where F_{A} and F_{B} are components of the forces that are perpendicular to the radial segments PA and PB. The principle of virtual work states that at equilibrium the generalized force is zero, that is

$$F_\theta = a F_A - b F_B = 0. \,\!$$

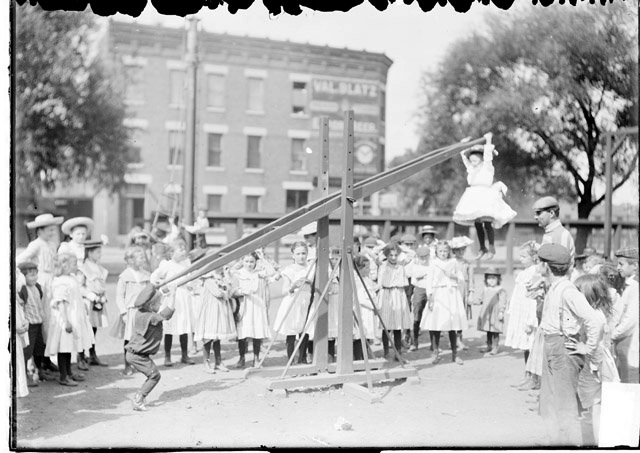
Simple lever, fulcrum, and vertical posts

Thus, the ratio of the output force F_{B} to the input force F_{A} is obtained as

$$MA = \frac{F_B}{F_A} = \frac{a}{b},$$

which is the mechanical advantage of the lever.

This equation shows that if the distance a from the fulcrum to the point A where the input force is applied is greater than the distance b from fulcrum to the point B where the output force is applied, then the lever amplifies the input force. If the opposite is true that the distance from the fulcrum to the input point A is less than from the fulcrum to the output point B, then the lever reduces the magnitude of the input force.

== See also ==
- Applied mechanics – Practical application of mechanics
- Balance lever coupling
- Bascule
- Linkage (mechanical) – Assembly of systems connected to manage forces and movement
- Mechanism (engineering) – Device which converts input forces and motion to output forces and motion
- On the Equilibrium of Planes – Mechanical treatise by Archimedes
- Simple machine – Mechanical device that changes the direction or magnitude of a force
