= Plum Point, Virginia =

Unincorporated community in Virginia, US

Coordinates: 37°31′00″N 76°48′49″W

Plum Point is an unincorporated community in New Kent County, Virginia, United States.
