= Skagen's Vippefyr =

Coordinates: 57°43′36″N 10°36′29″E

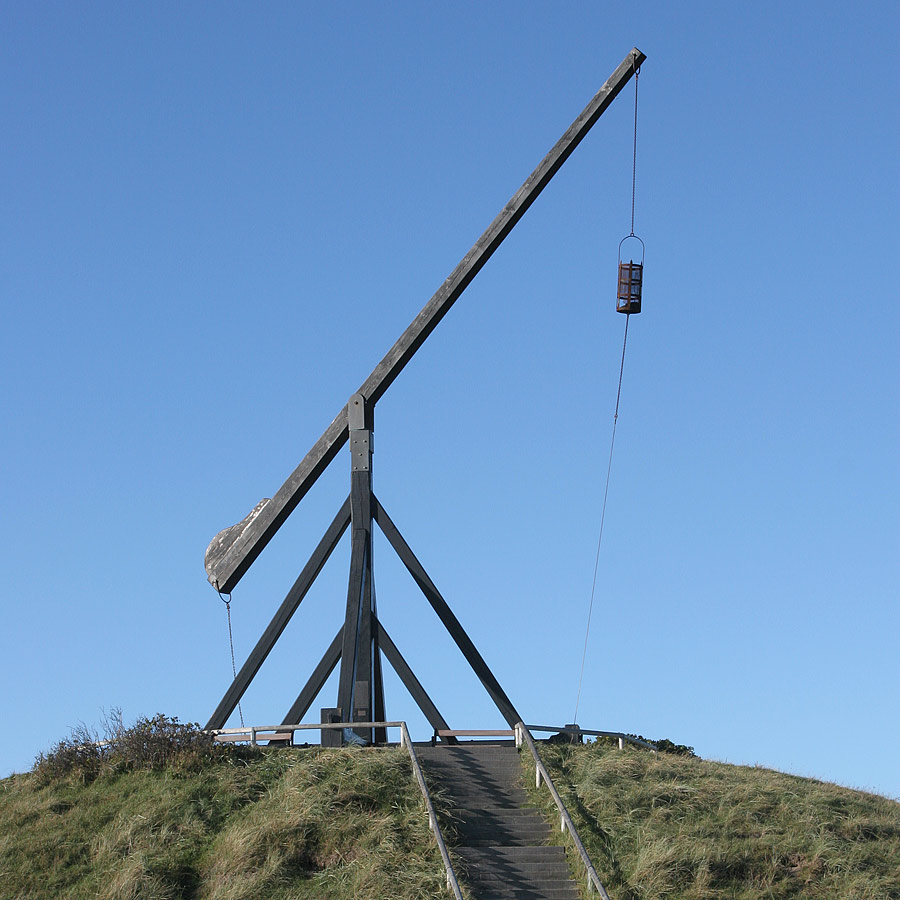
Skagen's vippefyr

Skagen's Vippefyr (sometimes referred to in English as Skagen's Lever Light) is a navigational light mechanism located in Skagen in the far north of Jutland. The original vippefyr, the first of its kind, was built in 1627. A faithful copy now stands on the same site. It replaced an earlier parrot light (papegøjefyr) and served until 1747 when the White Lighthouse was brought into operation.

== History ==
In 1560, Frederick II of Denmark ordered his vassal Otte Brahe to establish lights at Skagen, Anholt and Kullen (in Sweden) to mark the main route through Danish waters from the North Sea to the Baltic. Initially wood and seaweed were used as fuel for the light, burnt on a tiled floor at the top of a wooden tower. Later, coal was used for all Danish lights as it provided better illumination but it often caused the wooden towers to catch fire. It was Jens Pedersen Grove from Helsingør who designed the vippefyr which consisted of a tipping mechanism where the coal could be burnt in an iron container hoisted up into the air so that it could be seen from afar while avoiding damage to the wooden structure. Vippefyr simply means "tipping light" or "rocking light". Thanks to its success, vippefyr were also constructed at Falsterbo in southern Sweden and on the island of Anholt in the Kattegat. The latter remained in operation until 1788.

Today's vippefyr is a faithful copy of the original. It was the artist Carl Locher of the Skagen Painters who first made a copy in 1913 on the occasion of Skagen's 500th anniversary. It stood on the site of the first vippefyr until Rotary Skagen provided a reconstruction in 1958. It is lit once a year for the midsummer festivities on Sankt Hans Aften (St John's Eve - 23 June). Afterwards a bonfire is lit on the beach.

== See also ==
- Vippefyr
- List of lighthouses and lightvessels in Denmark
