= Færder National Park =

National park in Norway

- IUCN category II (national park)
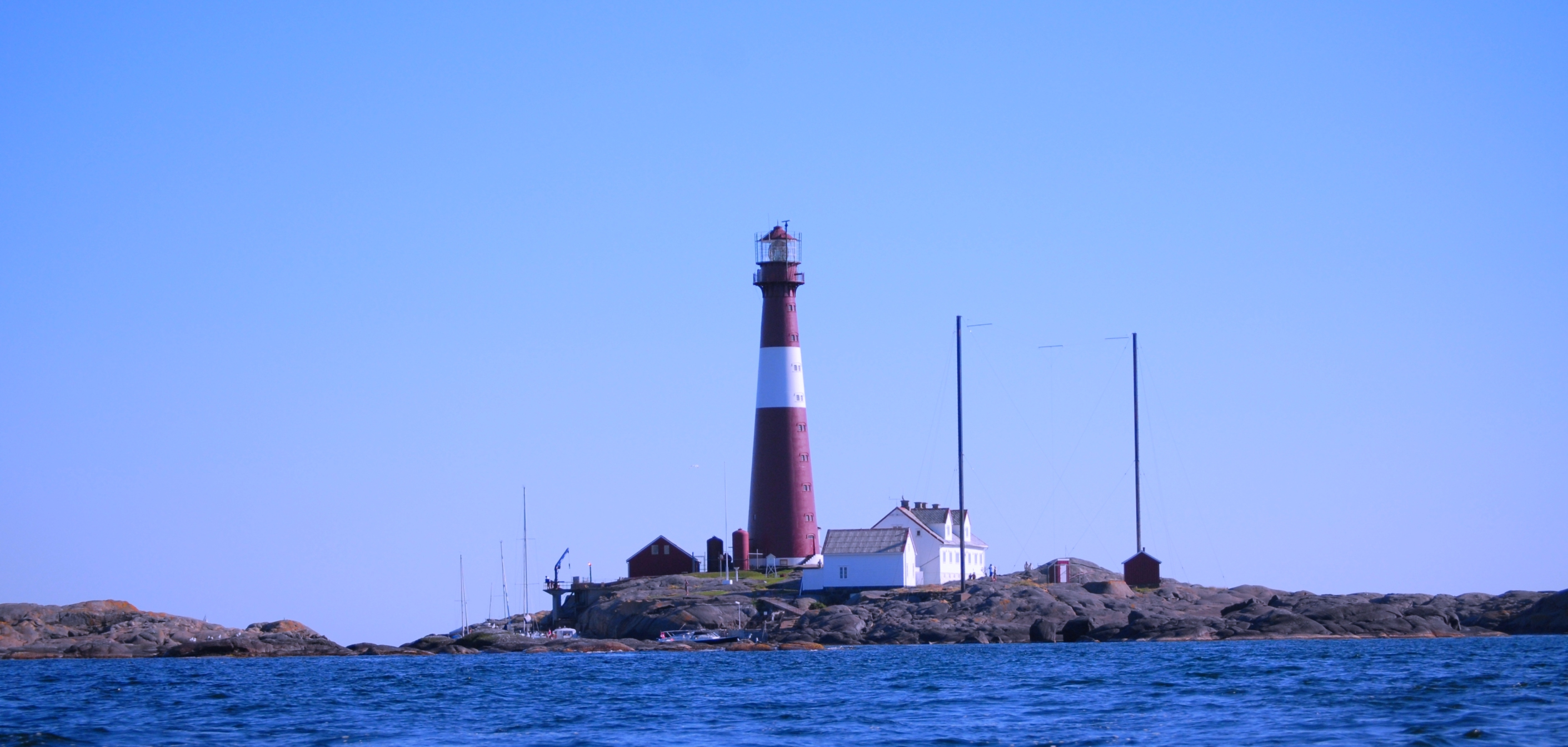
- Interactive map of Færder National Park
- Location: Færder, Norway
- Nearest city: Tønsberg
- Coordinates: 59°08′N 10°32′E
- Area: 340 km^{2} (130 sq mi), of which 15 km^{2} (5.8 sq mi) is land 325 km^{2} (125 sq mi) is water
- Established: 23 August 2013; 12 years ago
- Governing body: Norwegian Environment Agency

Færder National Park (Norwegian: Færder nasjonalpark) is a national park in Færder Municipality in Vestfold county, Norway. It is mostly a marine park, and includes some islands and coastal areas to the east of the larger islands of Nøtterøy and Tjøme. To the east, the national park borders to the Ytre Hvaler National Park. Færder covers an area of 340 km^{2} (130 sq mi), of which 325 km^{2} (125 sq mi) is sea and 15 km^{2} (6 sq mi) is land. The park was established on 23 August 2013. The park includes large parts of the archipelago of Bolærne, as well as the protected Færder Lighthouse and the ruins of Store Færder Lighthouse with its associated protected buildings.

== Gallery ==
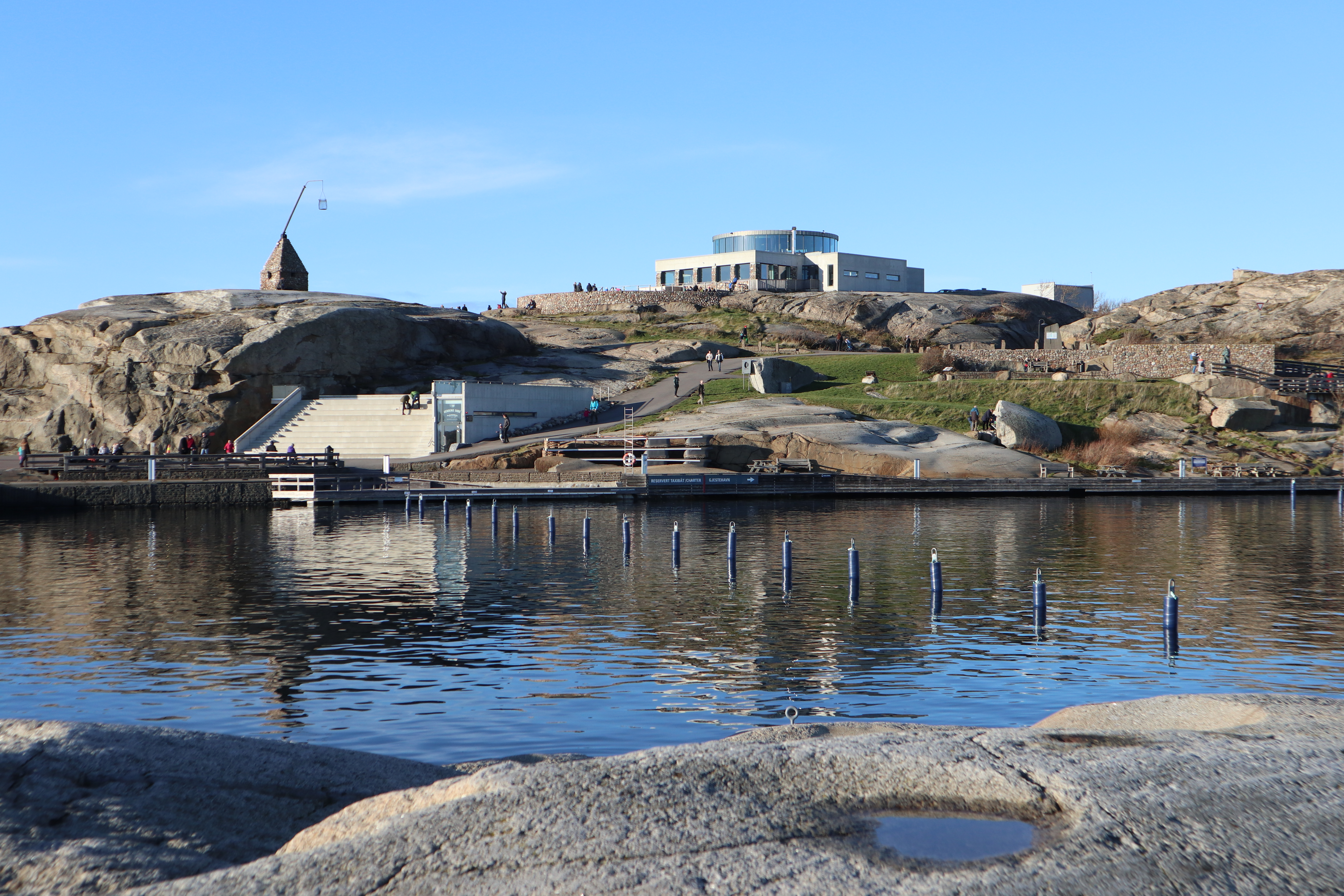

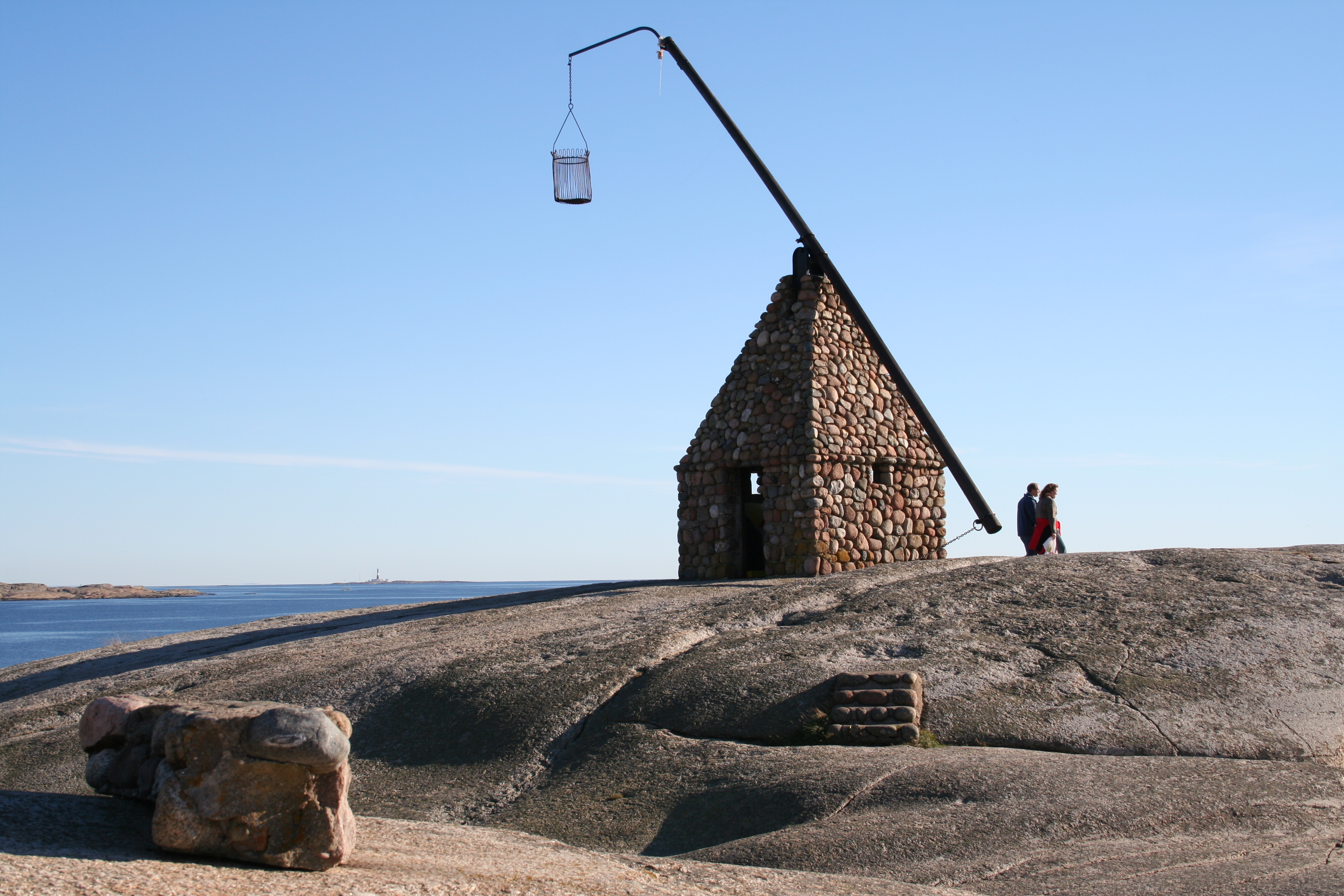

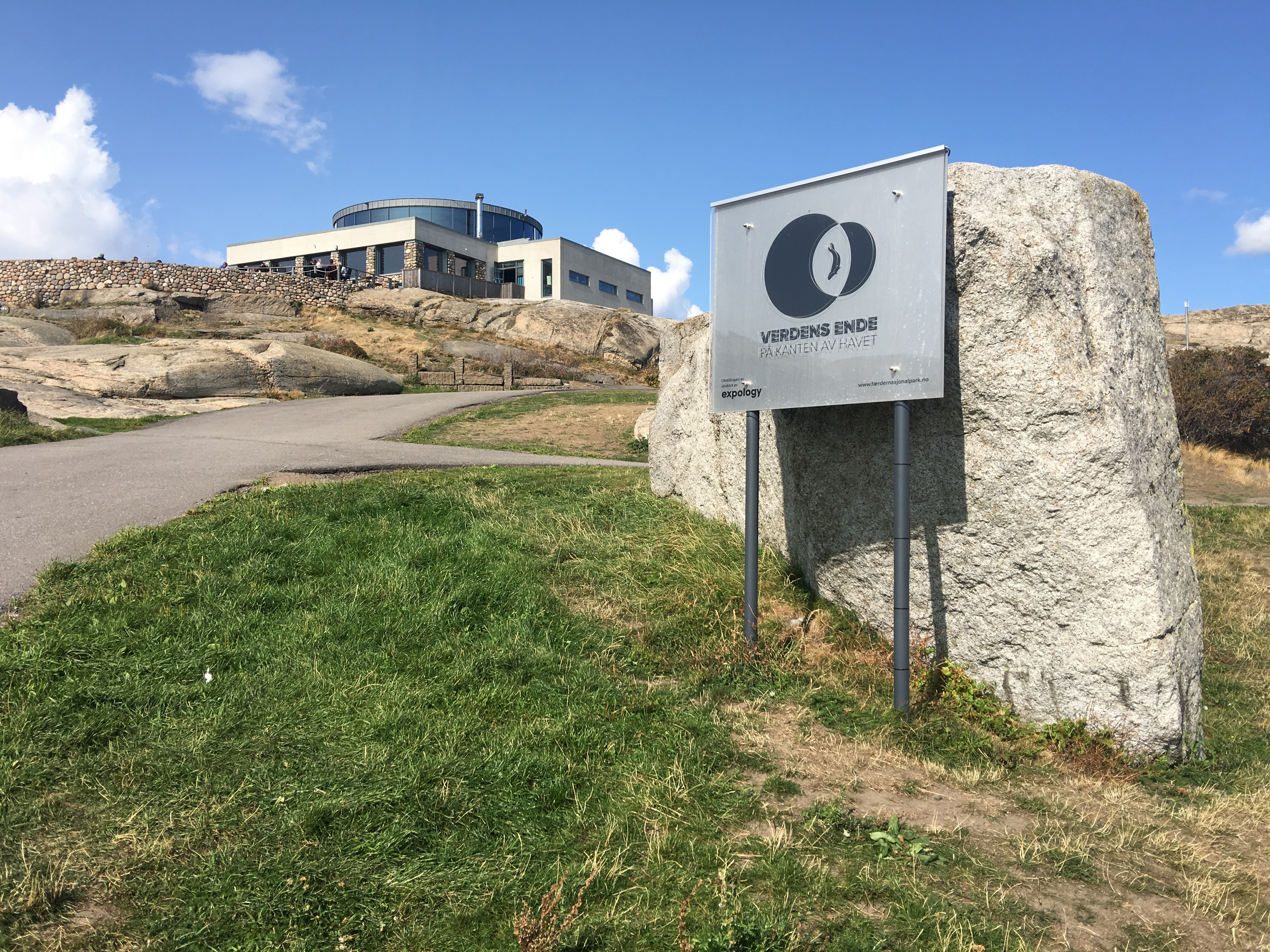

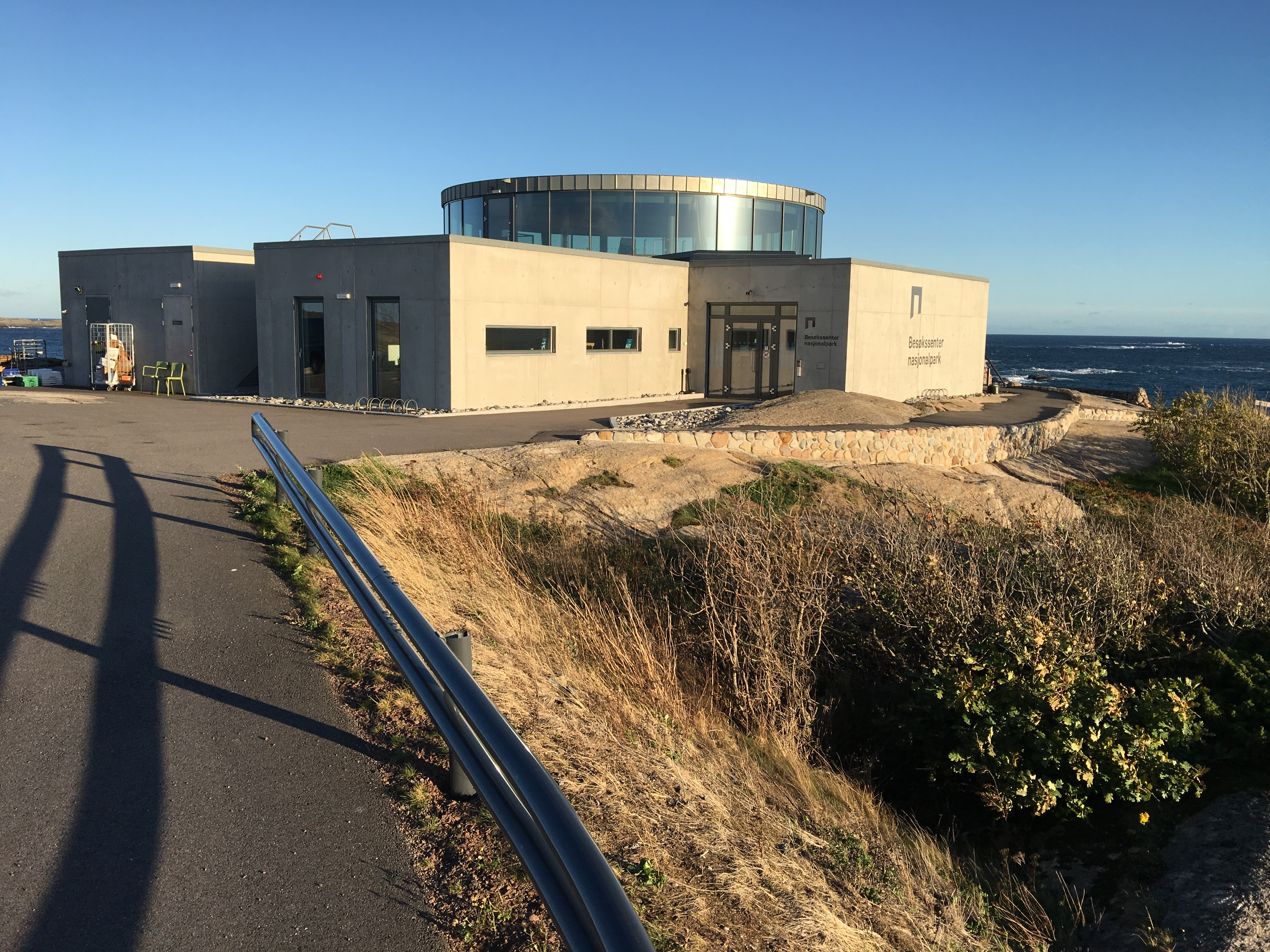

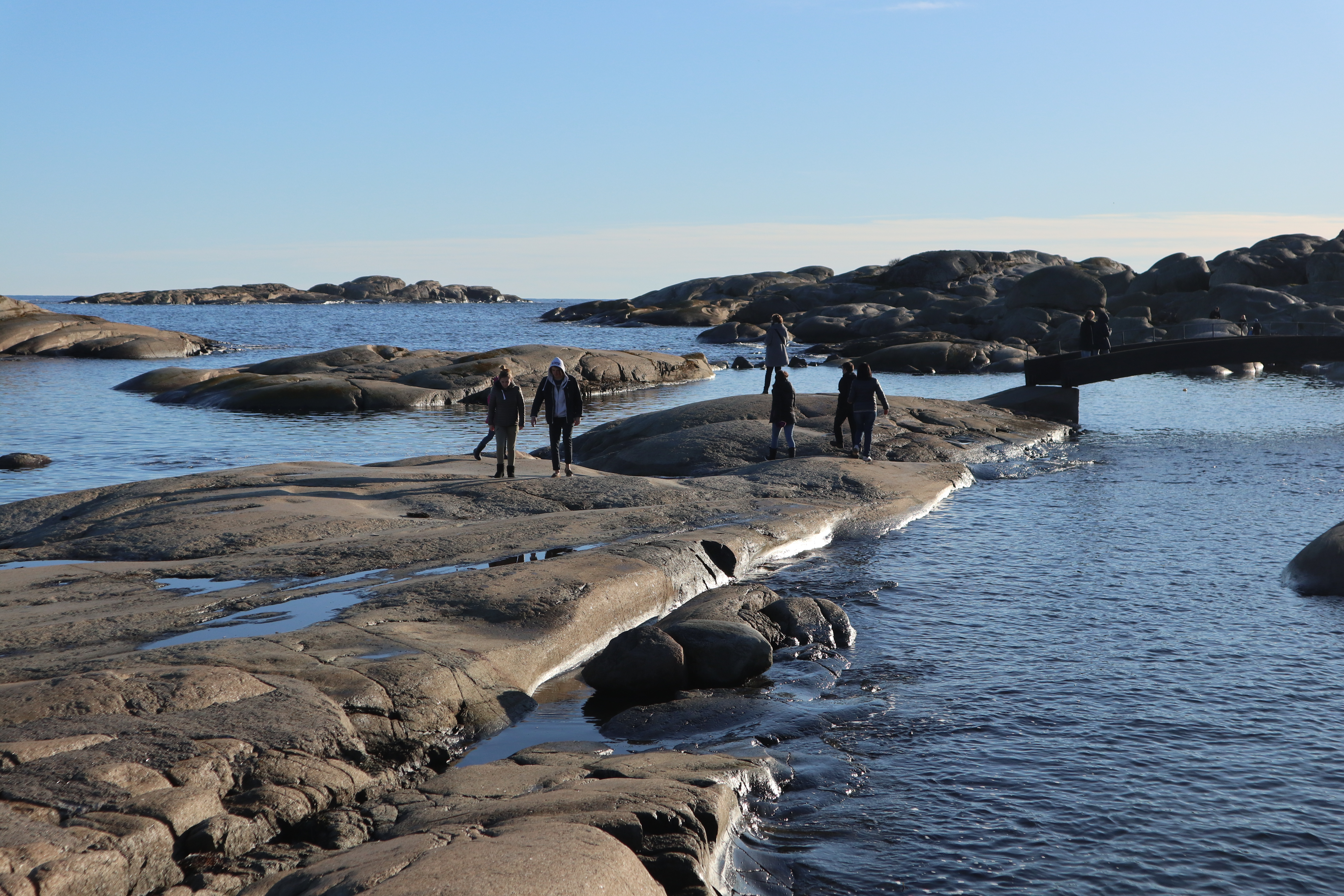

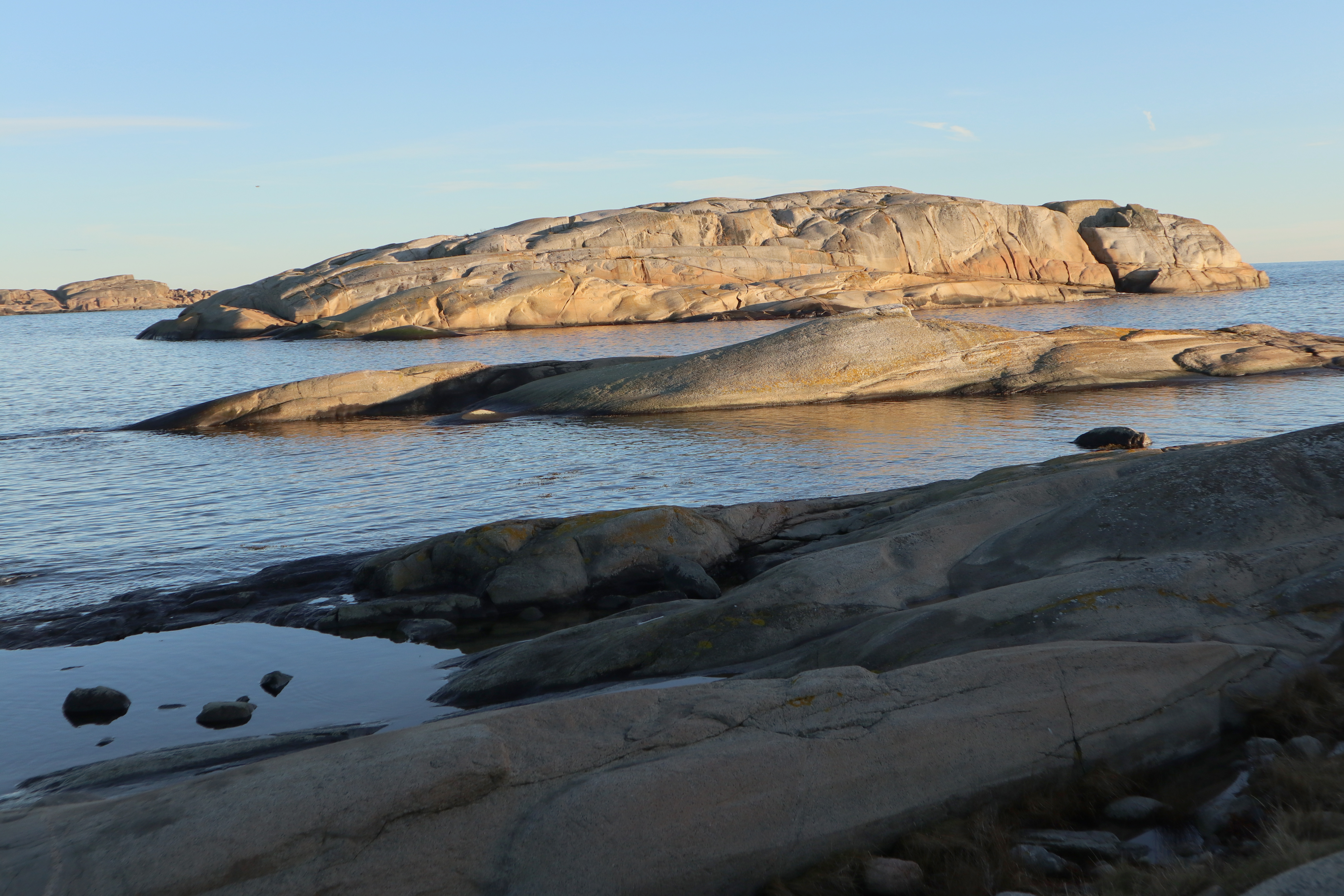

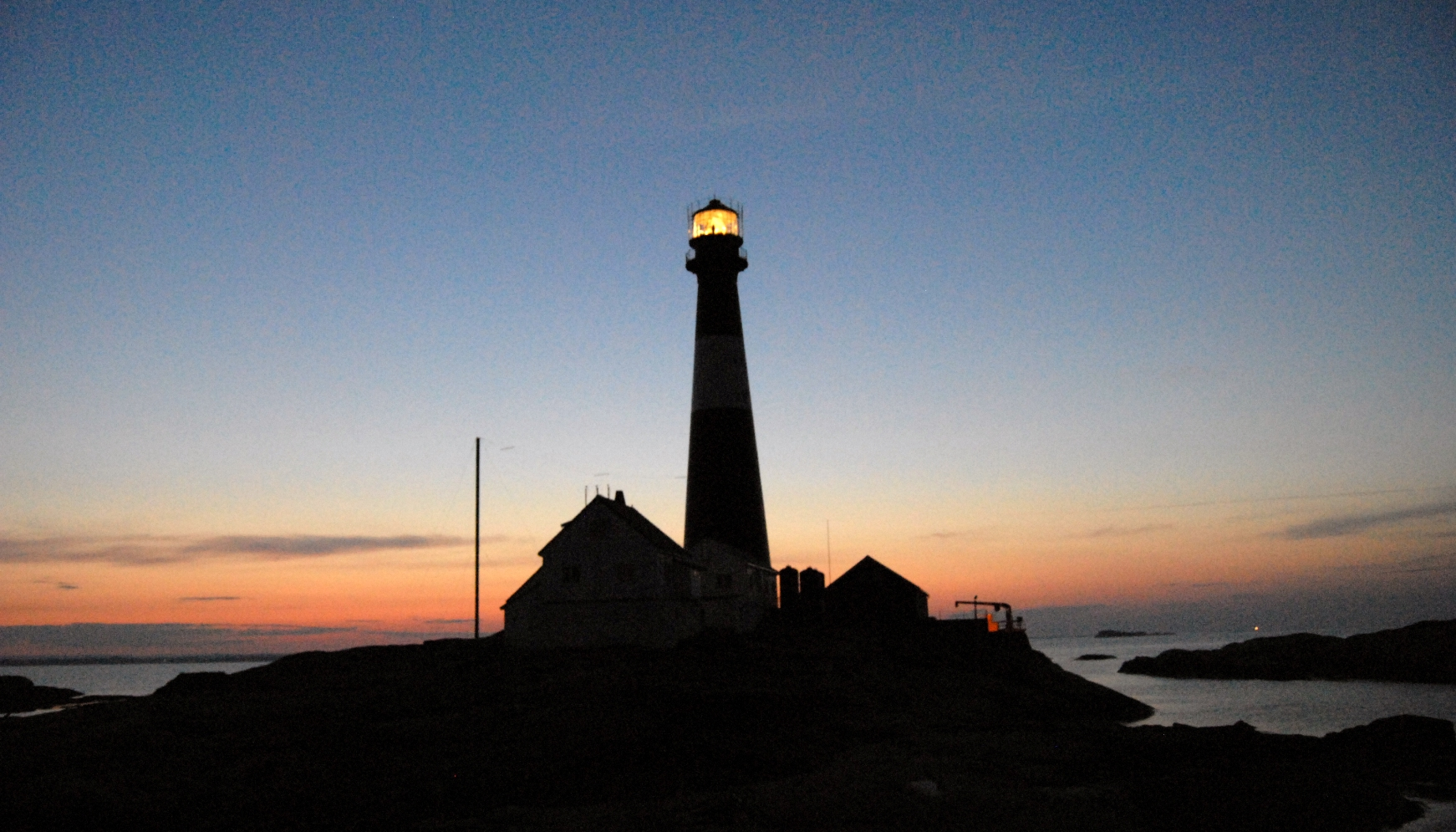

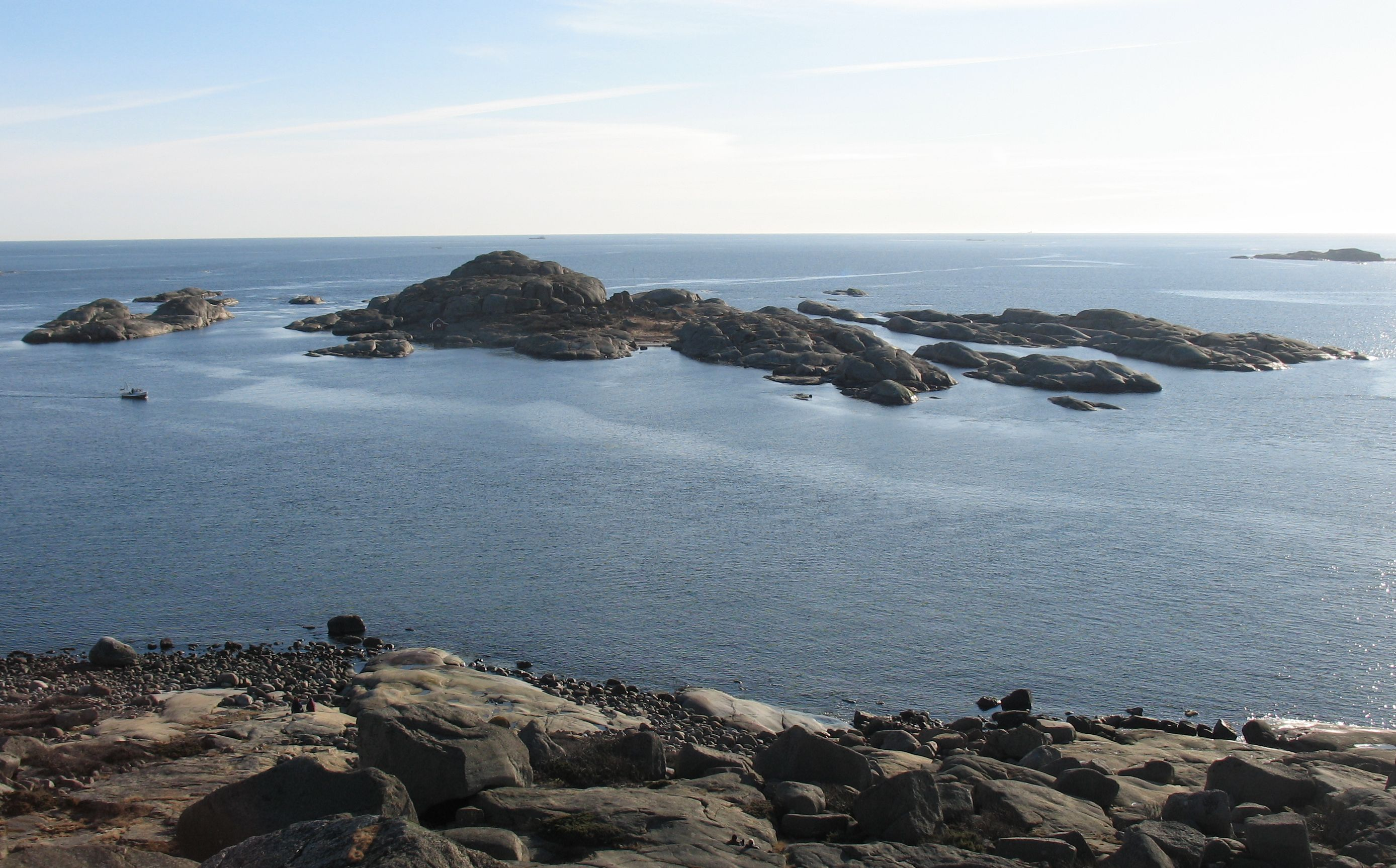

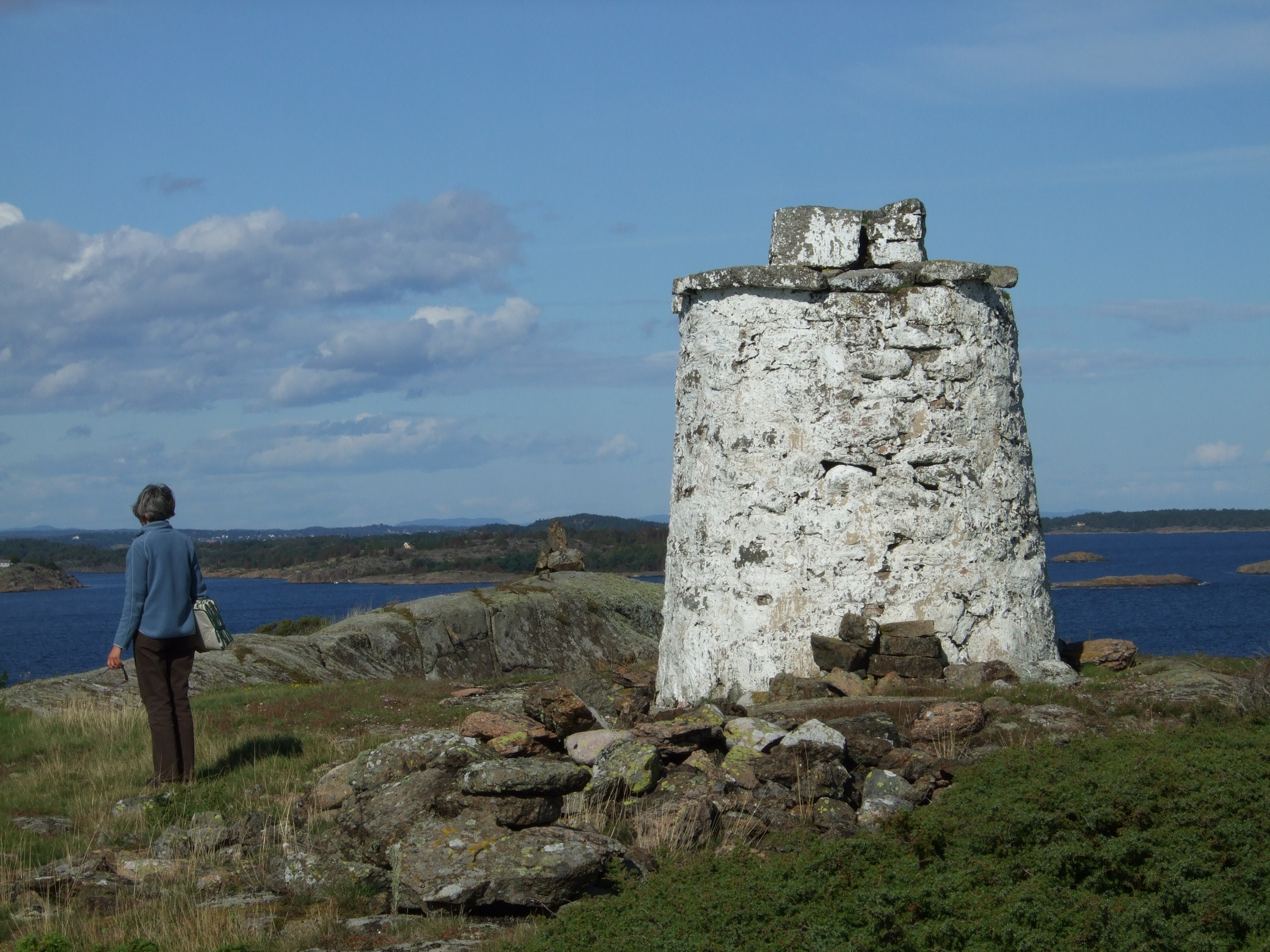

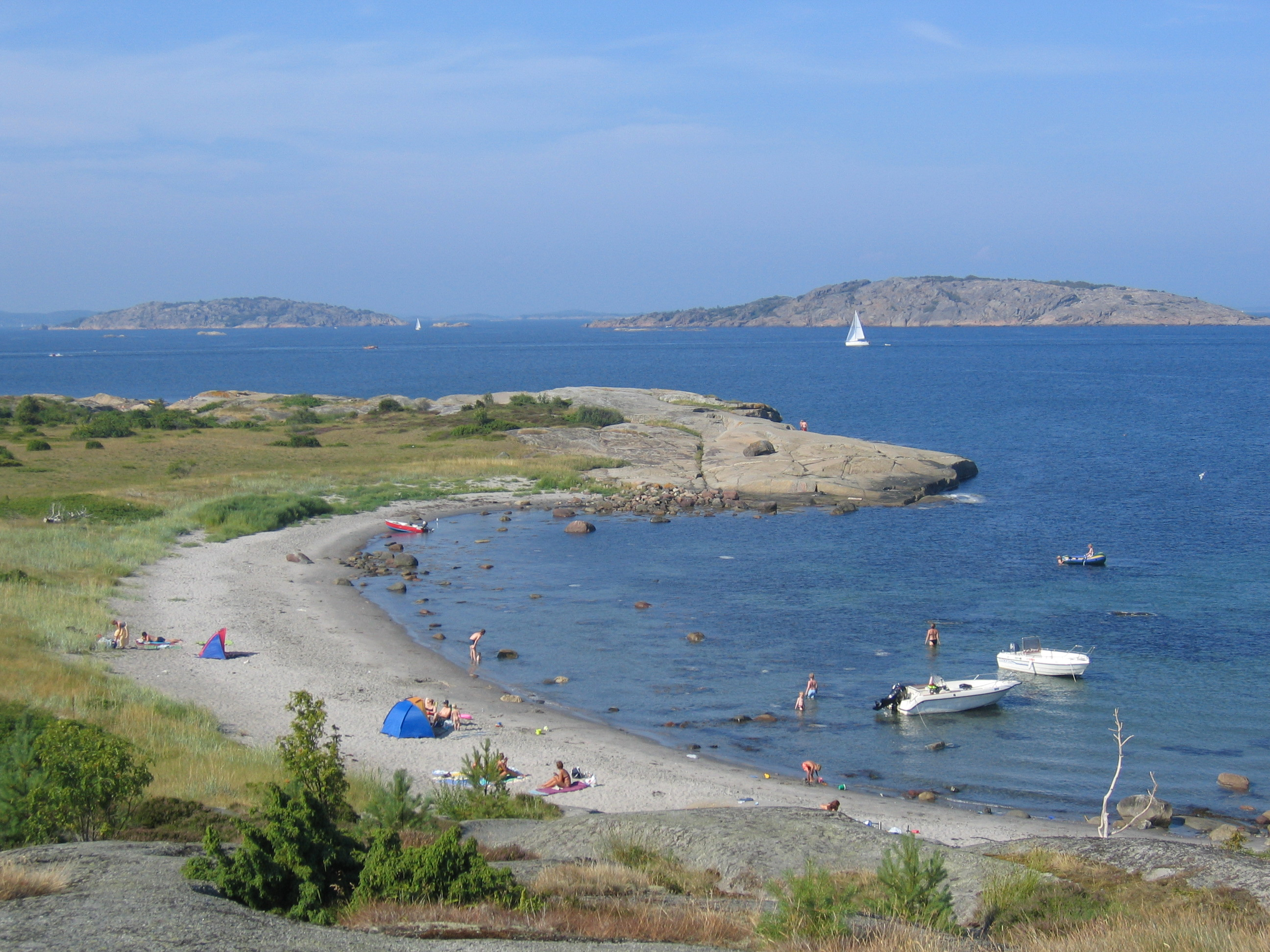

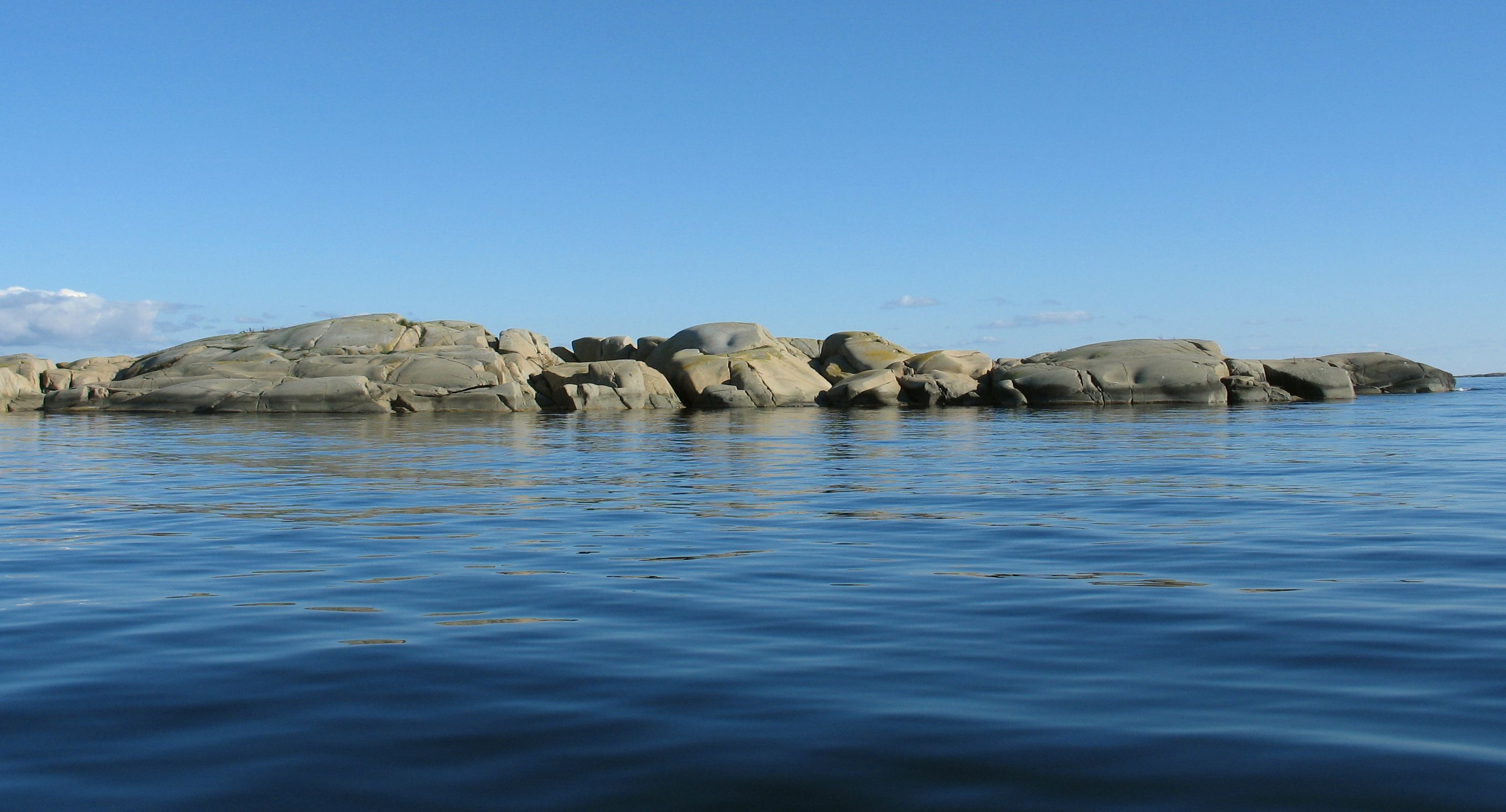

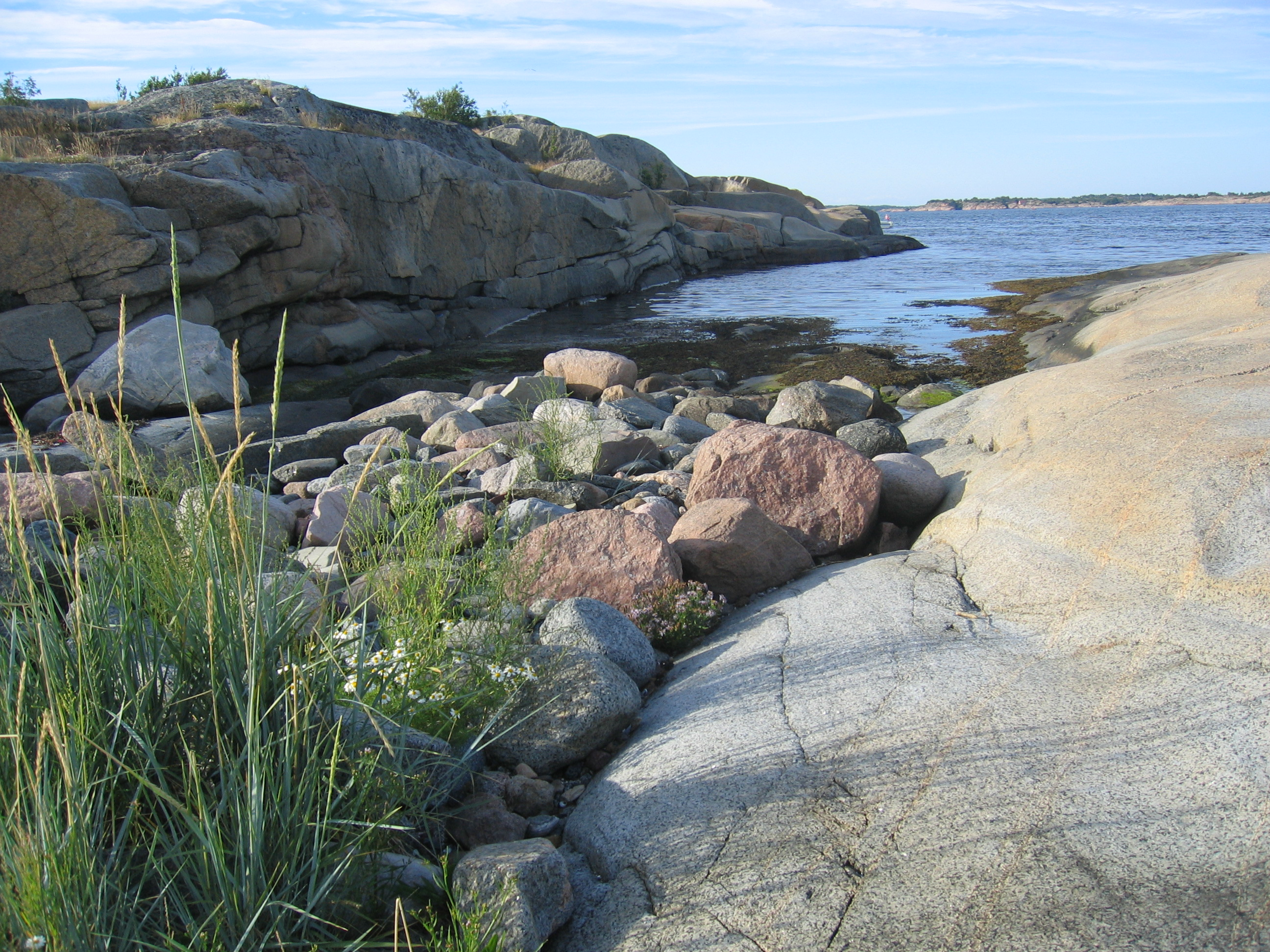

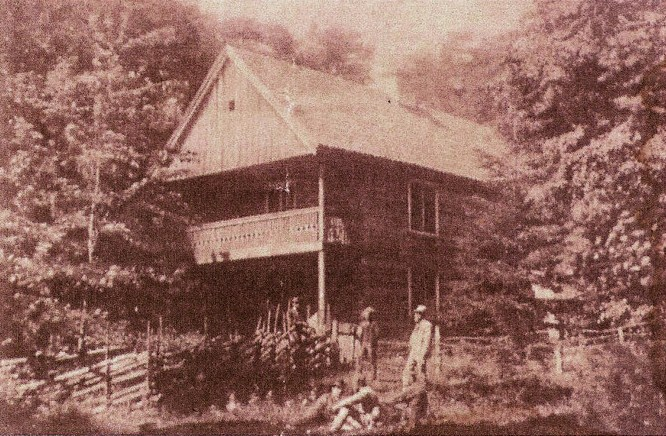

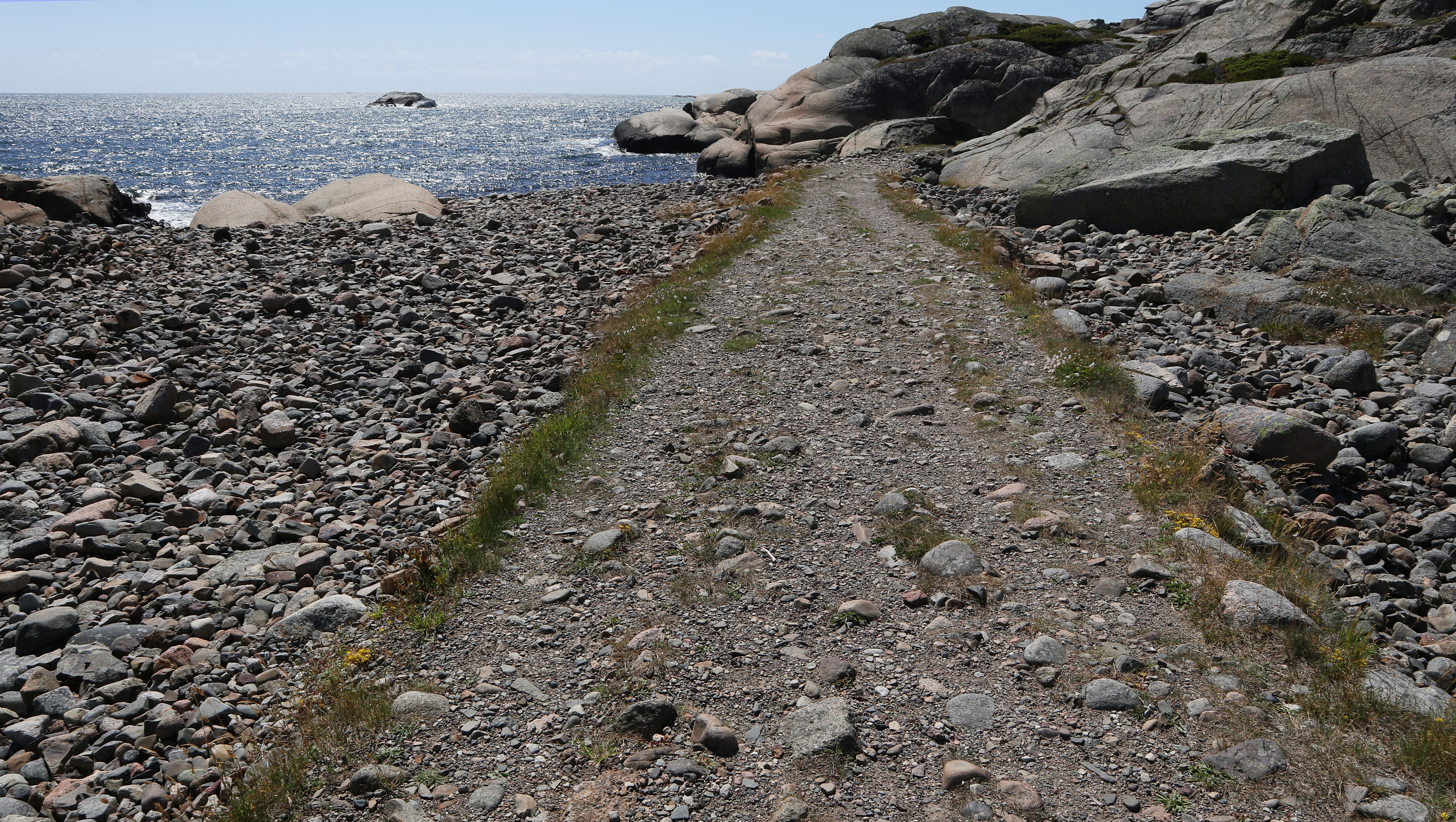

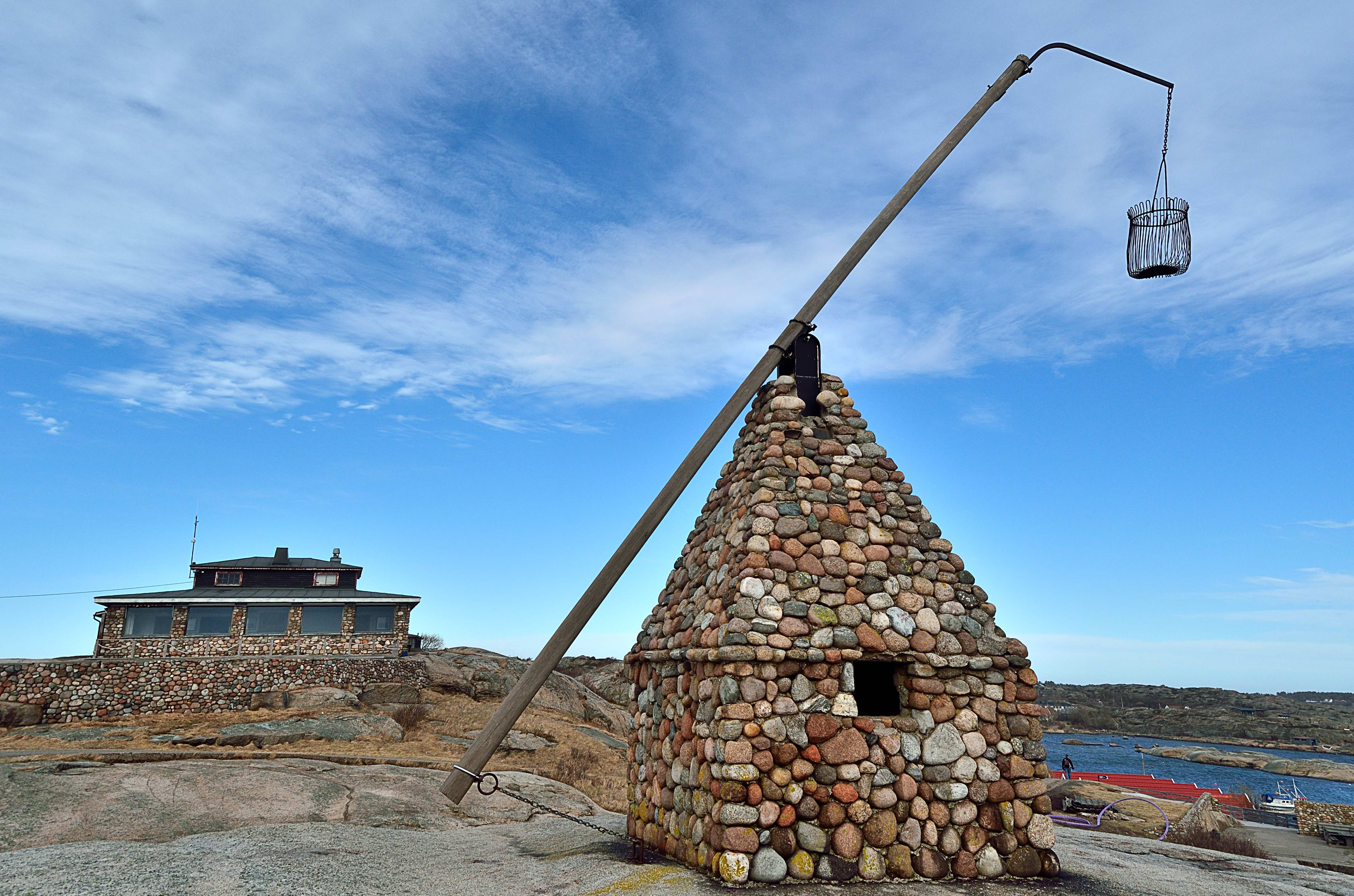

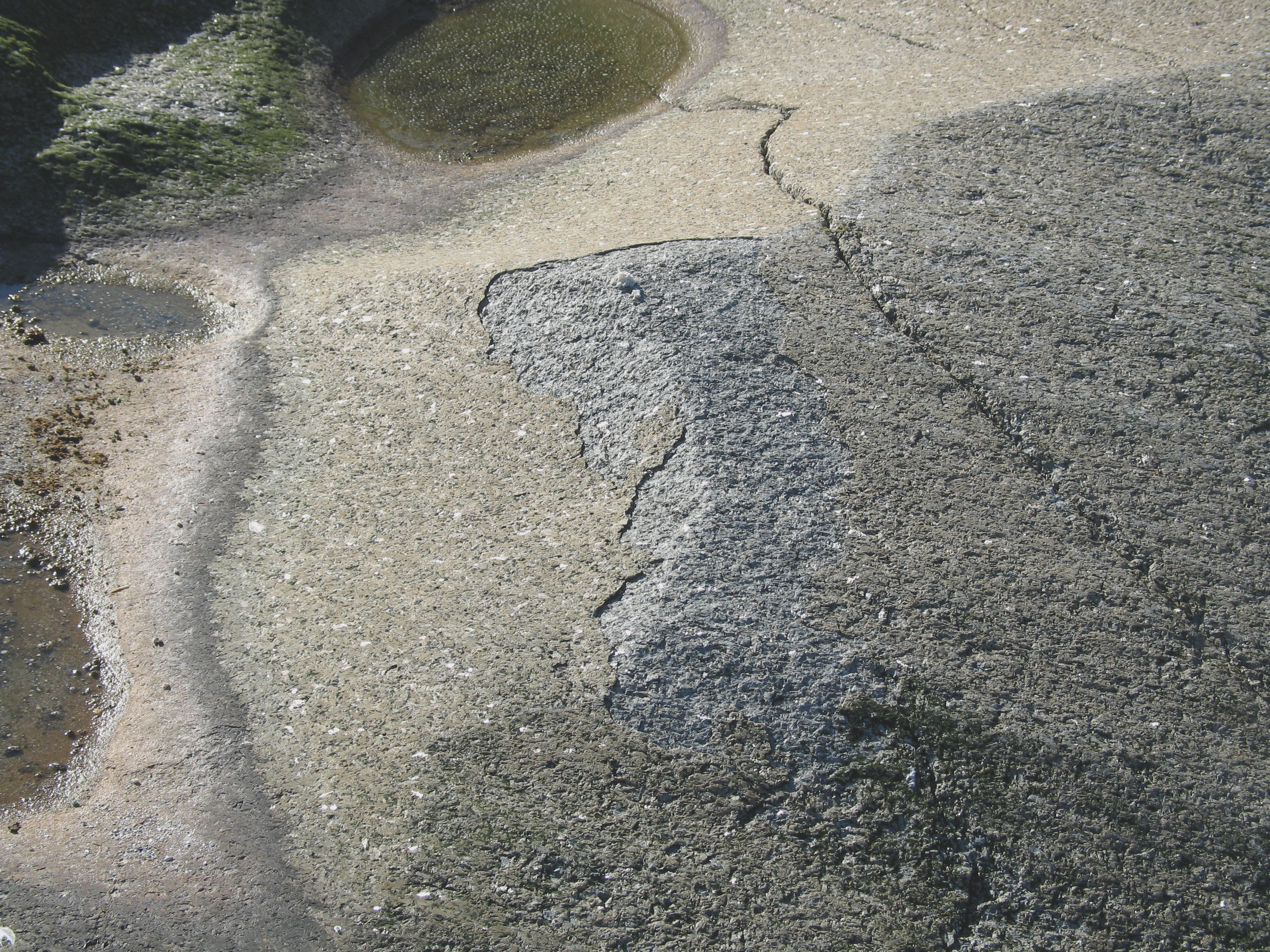
