= Hvasser =

Island in Vestfold, Norway

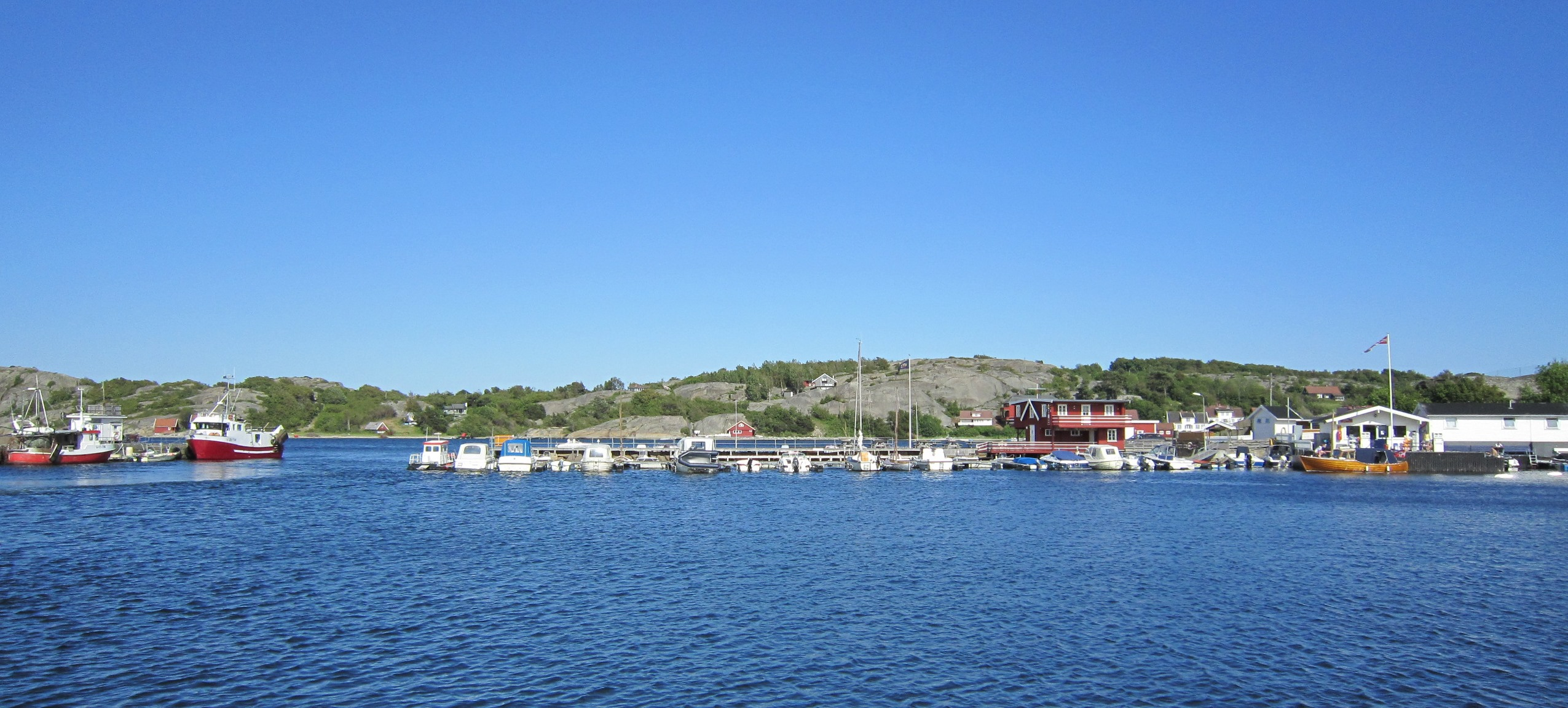
- Interactive map of the island

Geography
- Location: Vestfold, Norway
- Coordinates: 59.07501°N 10.44345°E
- Area: 3.6 km^{2} (1.4 sq mi)

Administration
- Norway
- County: Vestfold
- Municipality: Færder Municipality

Hvasser is a populated island in Færder Municipality in Vestfold county, Norway. The 3.6-square-kilometre (1.4 sq mi) island is located in the Oslofjord right between the island of Tjøme to the west and the small island of Sandø to the east. The island sits about 25 kilometres (16 mi) south of the city of Tønsberg and about 8 kilometres (5.0 mi) northwest of the Færder Lighthouse. The name comes from the Norwegian word "hvass", meaning sharp, which is owed to sharp cliffs on the island.

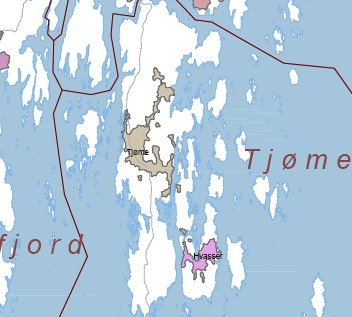
The island and village Hvasser. The village is coloured violet.

The island is connected to the national road network via a series of bridges over the islands of Brøtsø, Tjøme, and Nøtterøy. The island is a popular summer holiday destination. It is home to various hiking trails and bathing beaches. Hvasser Church is located in the village. There is also a harbor, restaurant, gallery, and general store on the east coast of the island along the Sandøsundet strait. Hvasser is also the pilot harbour for ships in and out the Oslo fjord. There is also a fish reception establishment.

The island is well developed with many homes. The central part of the island is heavily populated and the area is known as the village of Hvasser. The 0.62-square-kilometre (150-acre) village has a population (2026) of 388 and a population density of 626 inhabitants per square kilometre (1,620/sq mi).

== See also ==
- List of islands of Norway
