= Verdens Ende =

Scenic point on the Skagerrak in Norway

Verdens Ende Helgerødtangen
- Peninsula
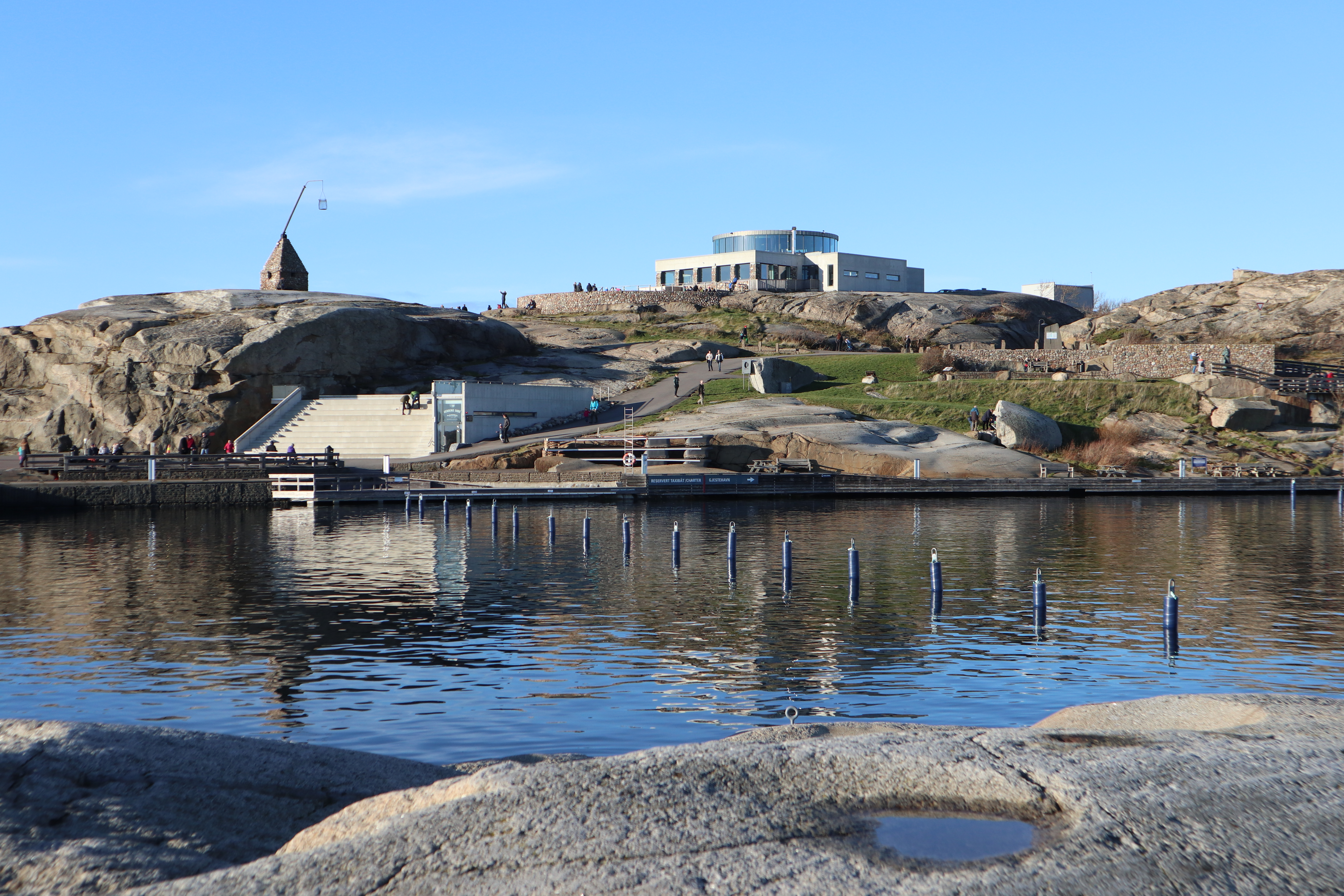
- Verdens Ende has a reconstructed tipping lantern, a port, and the visitors' centre for Færder National Park; Credit: Karl Ragnar Gjertsen, 2017
- Interactive map of Verdens Ende
- Coordinates: 59.05832°N 10.40709°E
- Location: Vestfold, Norway
- Part of: Tjøme
- Water bodies: Oslofjorden

Verdens Ende (English: World's End or The End of the Earth; historic: Helgerødtangen) is located at the southernmost tip of the island of Tjøme in Færder Municipality in Vestfold county, Norway.

The point is composed of various islets and rocks and is one of the most popular scenic spots in the area, with panoramic views of the Skagerrak strait and local fishing facilities. It also has a replica of an old Vippefyr, an early type of beacon or lighthouse, erected in 1934.

The visitors' centre for the Færder National Park is located at Verdens Ende. The national park includes 340 square kilometres (130 sq mi) of mainland, islands, skerries, and sea bed in the outer Oslofjorden.

An ultramarathon endurance foot race, Soria Moria til Verdens Ende has its finish line at this point, and starts at the Hotel Soria Moria in Oslo, 161 kilometres (100 mi) away.

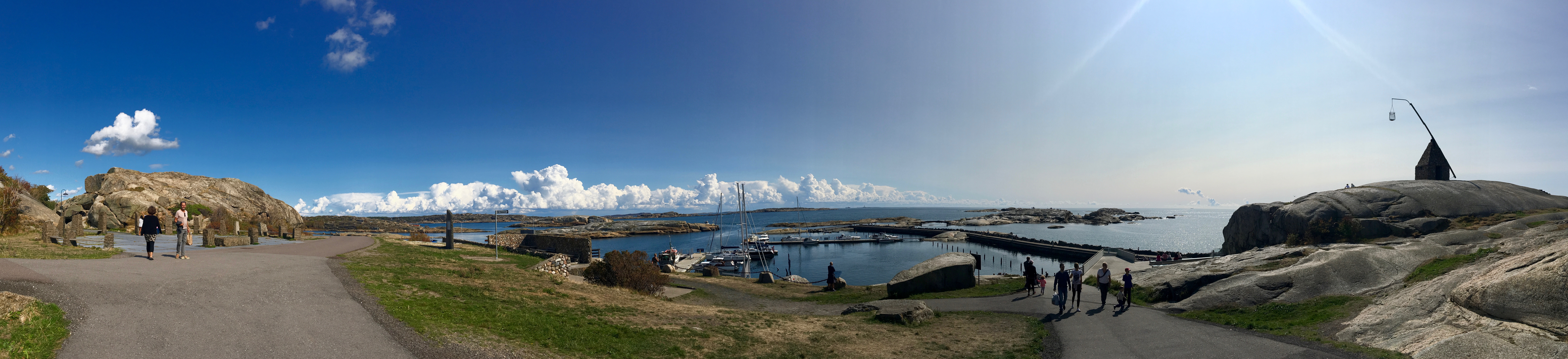
Verdens Ende is a popular recreational area at the west coast of the outer part of Oslofjorden with panoramic views towards the sea in east and south
