= Store Færder Lighthouse =

Coastal lighthouse in Norway

Store Færder Lighthouse Store Færder Fyr
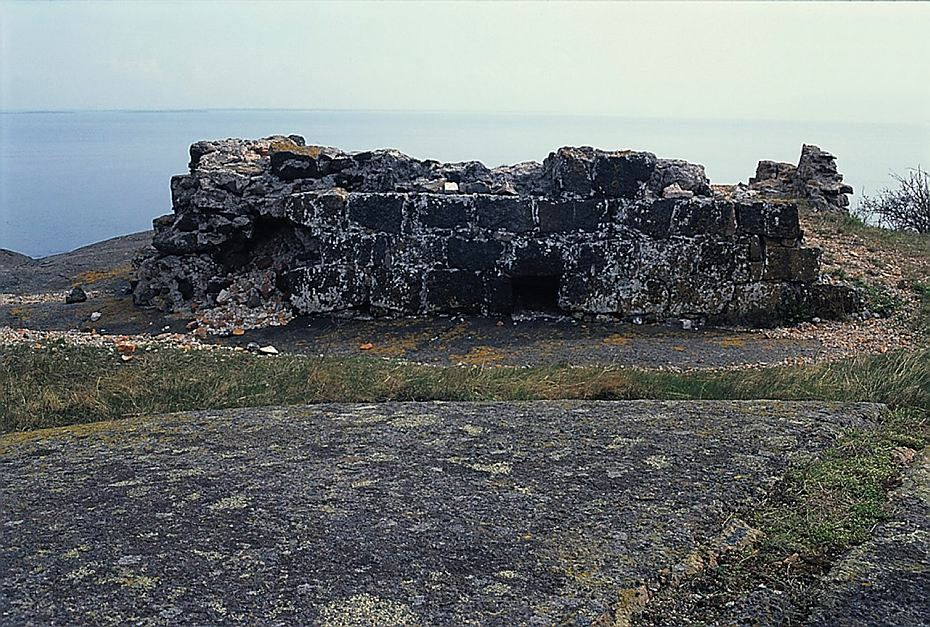
- Ruins of the old Store Færder lighthouse
- Location: Store Færder, Tjøme, Færder, Norway
- Coordinates: 59°04′N 10°31′E

Tower
- Constructed: 1696

Light
- Deactivated: 1857

Store Færder Lighthouse (Norwegian: Færder fyr) is a former coastal lighthouse in Færder Municipality in Vestfold county, Norway. The lighthouse was located on the island of Store Færder, first lit in 1696. From the start the light was simply an iron pot placed on the ground. Later a stone tower was built, finished in 1802. A lens was installed in 1852. In 1857 the lighthouse was replaced by the new Færder Lighthouse on Tristein. The stone tower at Store Færder is now in ruins. The ruins along with the other station buildings are listed as a protected site.

== See also ==
- List of lighthouses in Norway
- Lighthouses in Norway
