= Hvasser Church =

Church in Vestfold, Norway

- Hvasser kirke
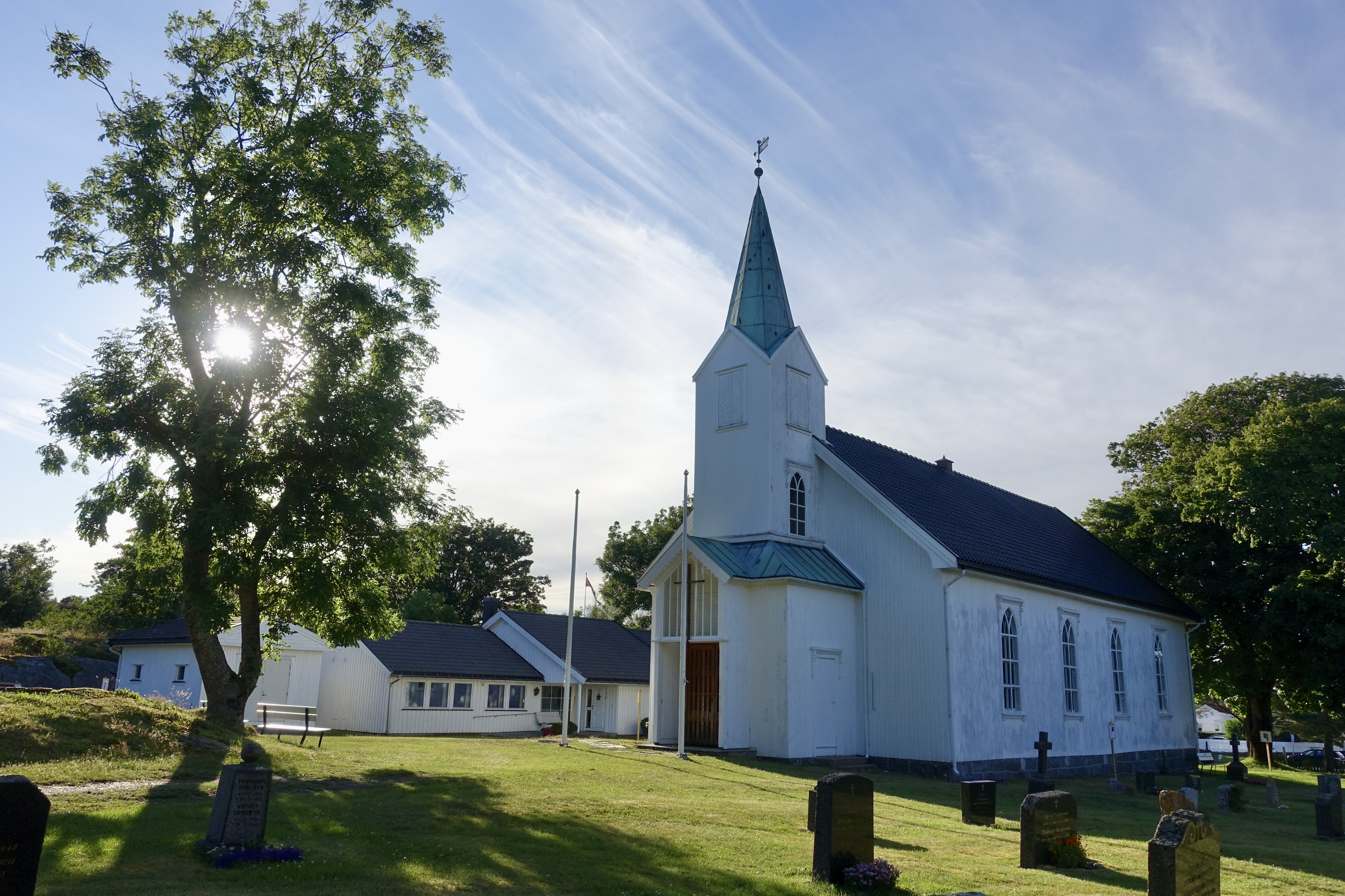
- View of the church
- Hvasser Church
- 59°04′49″N 10°26′36″E
- Location: Færder Municipality, Vestfold
- Country: Norway
- Denomination: Church of Norway
- Churchmanship: Evangelical Lutheran

History
- Former name: Hvasser kapell
- Status: Parish church
- Founded: 1903
- Consecrated: 26 June 1903

Architecture
- Functional status: Active
- Architect: Monrad Nyby
- Architectural type: Long church
- Completed: 1903 (123 years ago)

Specifications
- Capacity: 180
- Materials: Wood

Administration
- Diocese: Tunsberg
- Deanery: Tønsberg domprosti
- Parish: Hvasser
- Norwegian Cultural Heritage Site
- Type: Church
- Status: Not protected
- ID: 84682

Hvasser Church (Norwegian: Hvasser kirke) is a parish church of the Church of Norway in Færder Municipality in Vestfold county, Norway. It is located in the village of Hvasser. It is the church for the Hvasser parish which is part of the Tønsberg domprosti (deanery) in the Diocese of Tunsberg. The white, wooden church was built in a long church design in 1903 using plans drawn up by the architect Monrad Nyby. The church seats about 180 people.

== History ==
In 1903, a new chapel was built in Hvasser (it was later upgraded to the status of a full parish church). The new building was consecrated on 26 June 1903. In 1912, a new church porch and bell tower was built on the south end of the nave.

On 26 October 2005, a 14-year-old boy tried to set fire to the church. The boy was later arrested and confessed to the arson.

== Media gallery ==
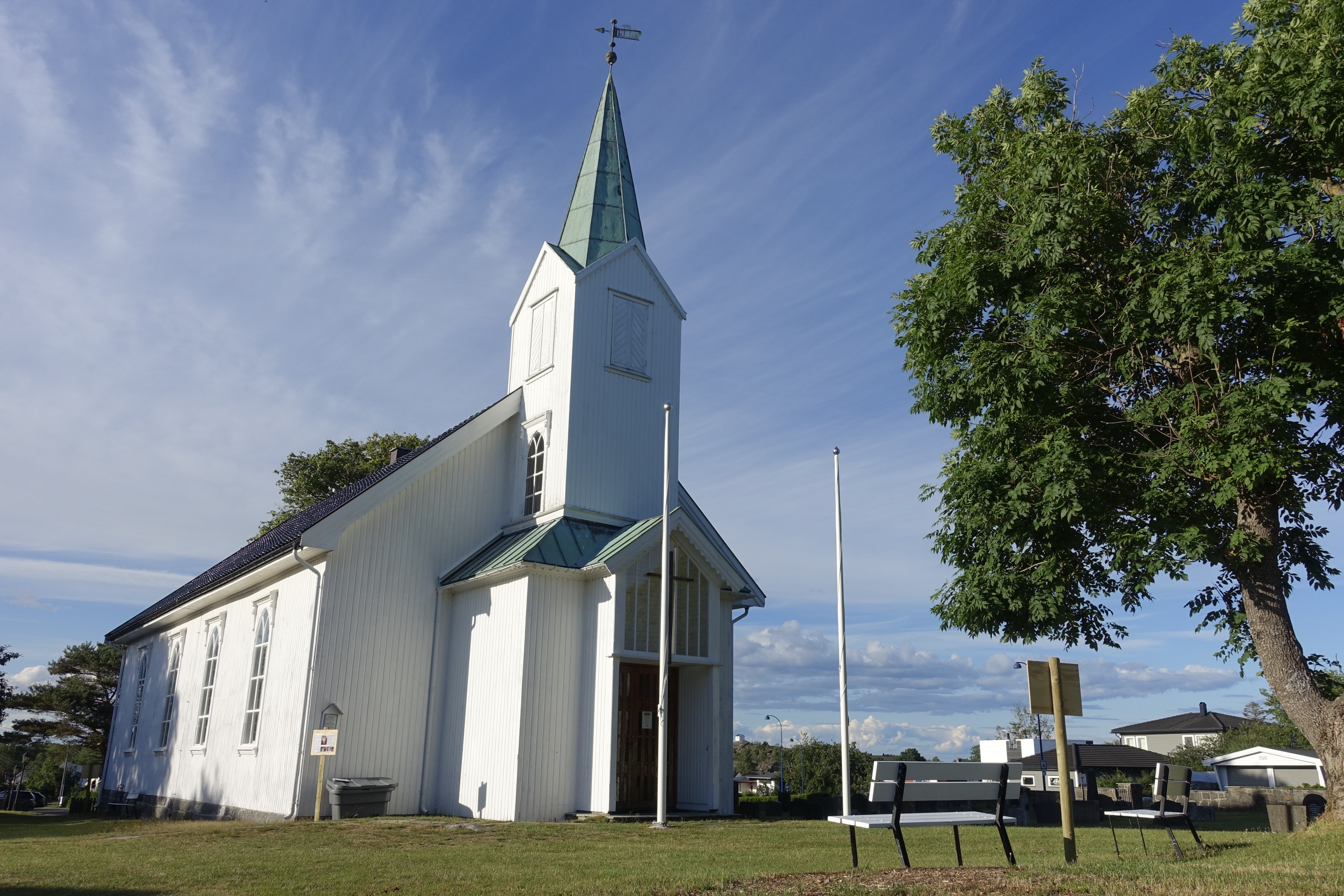

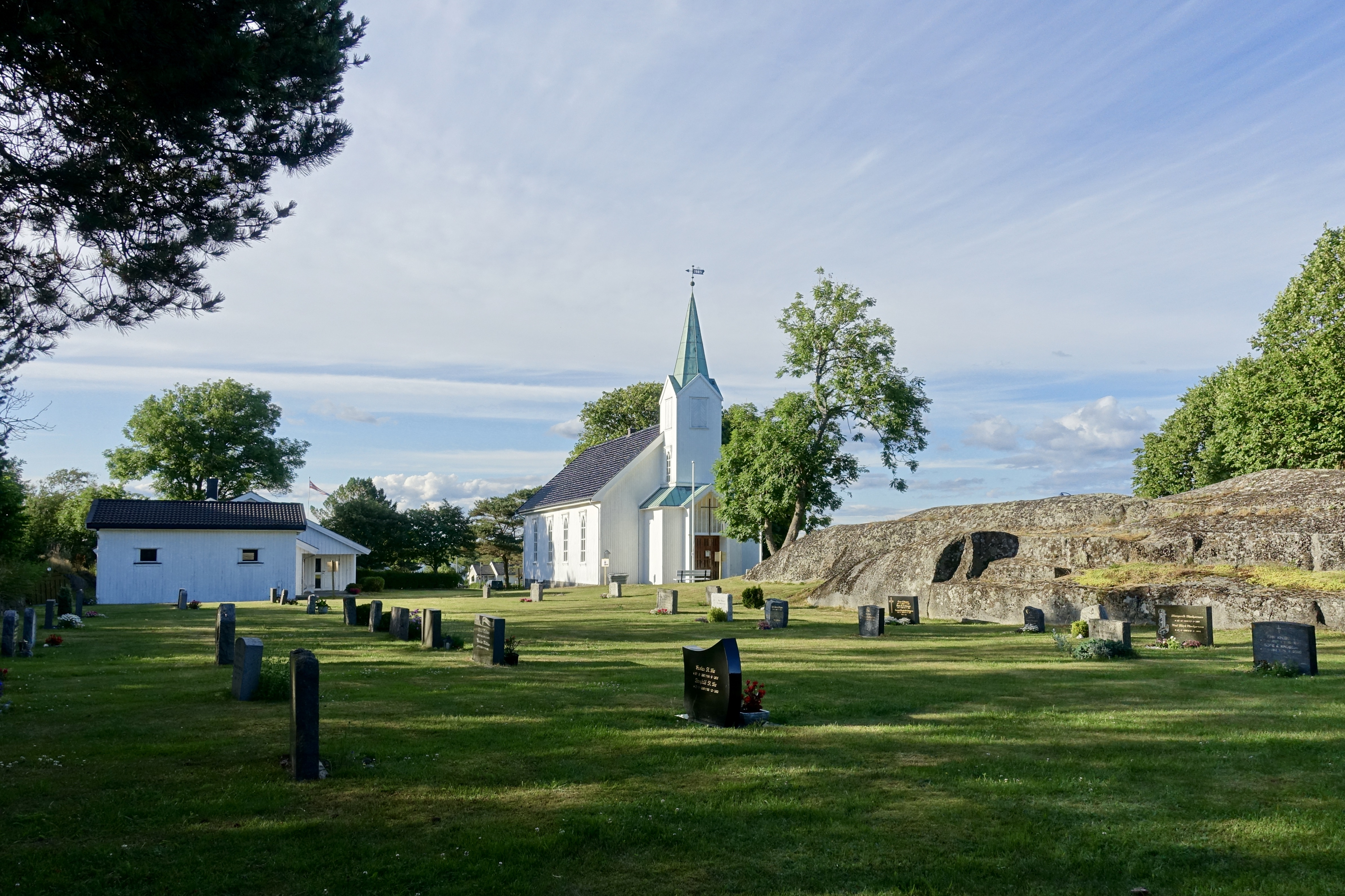

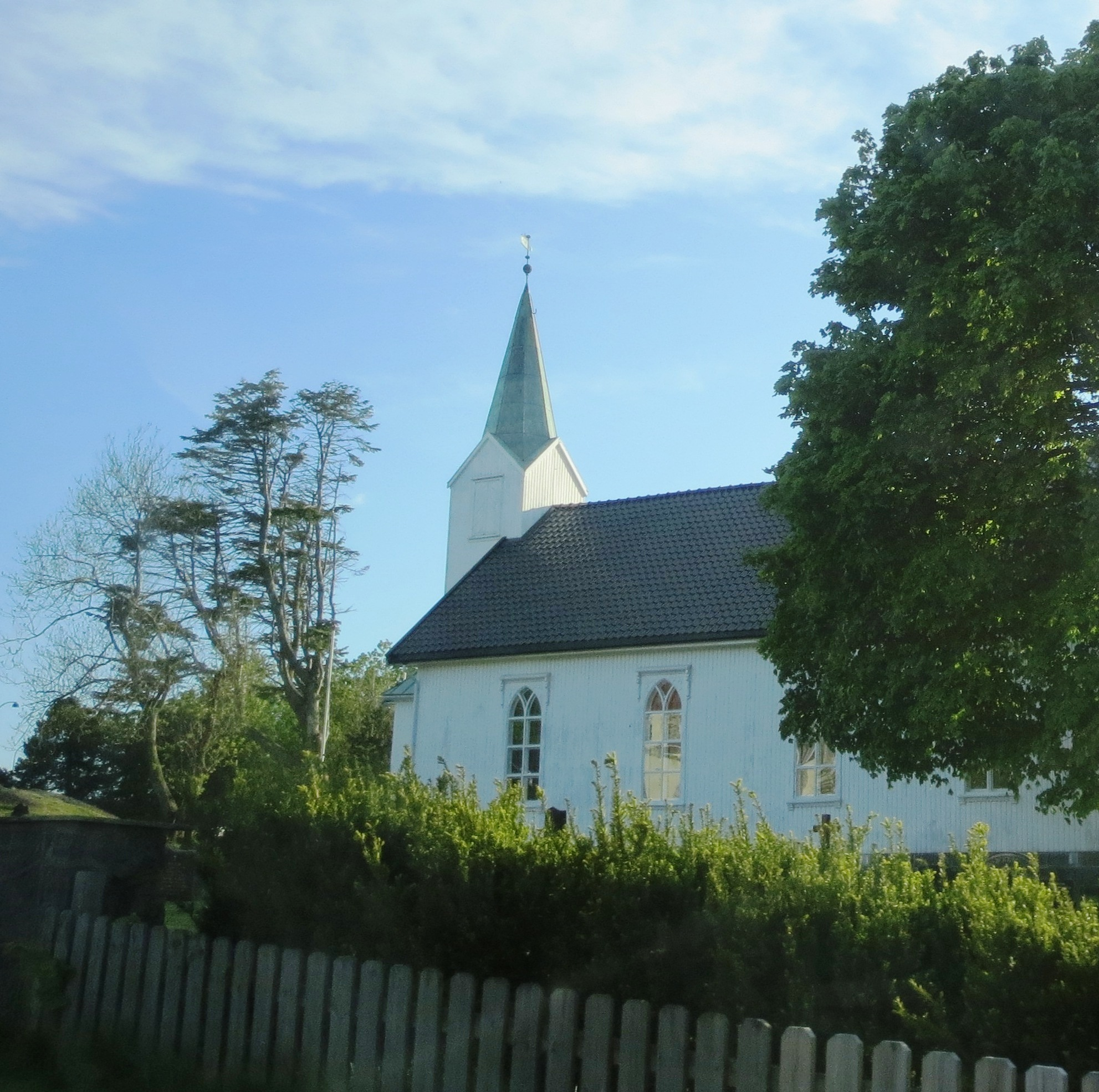

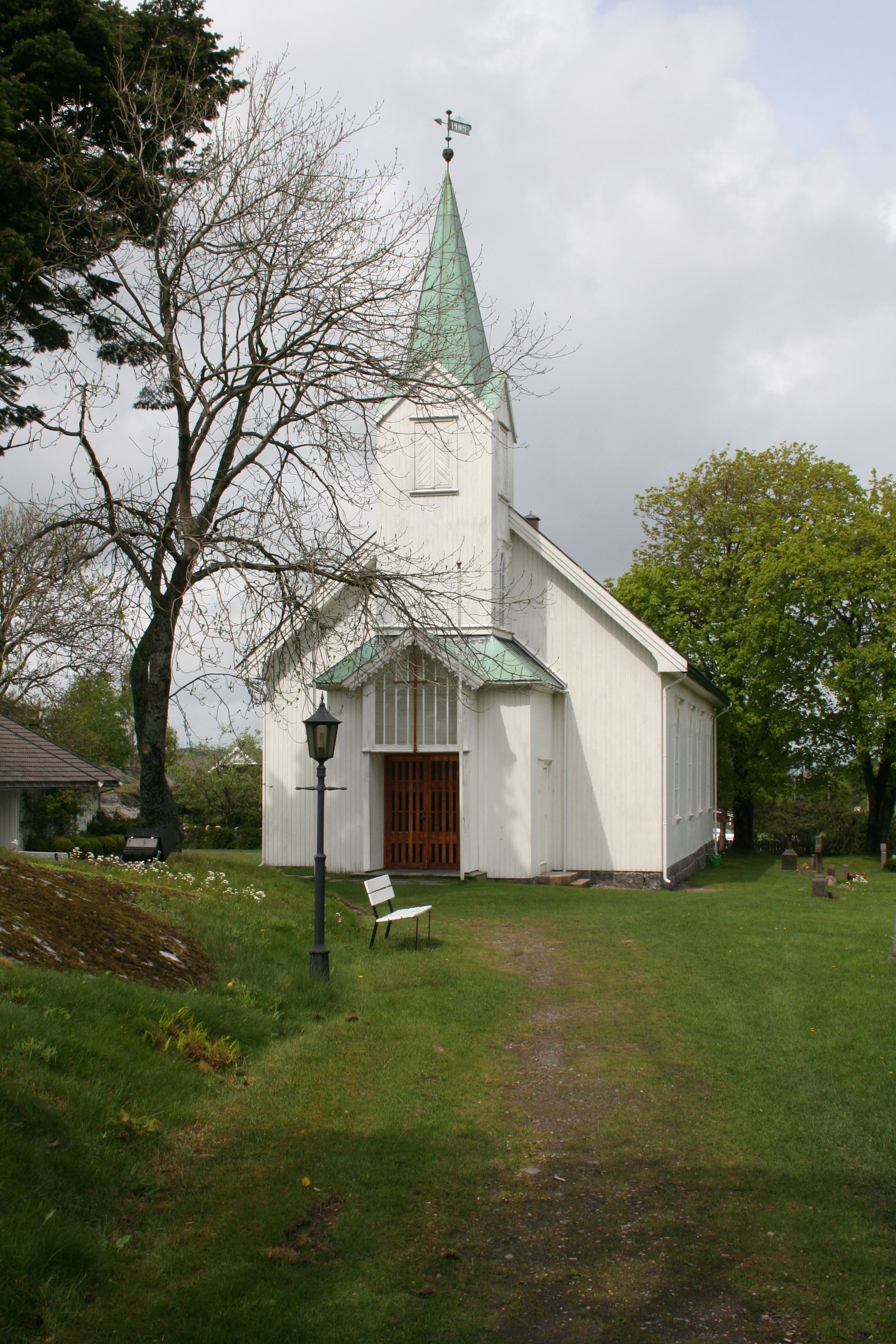
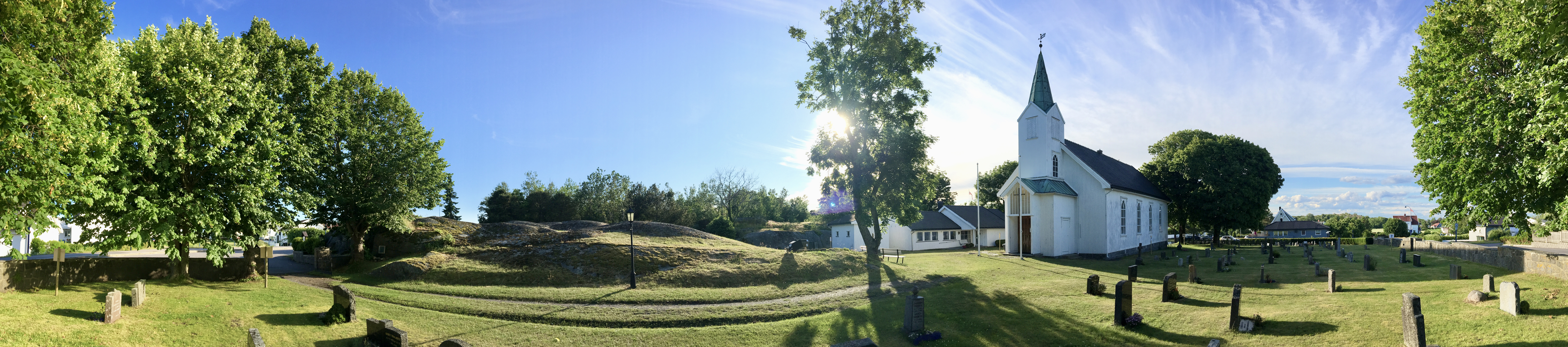
Panoramic view of the church (scroll to see more)

== See also ==
- List of churches in Tunsberg
