= Tjøme (island) =

Island in Vestfold, Norway

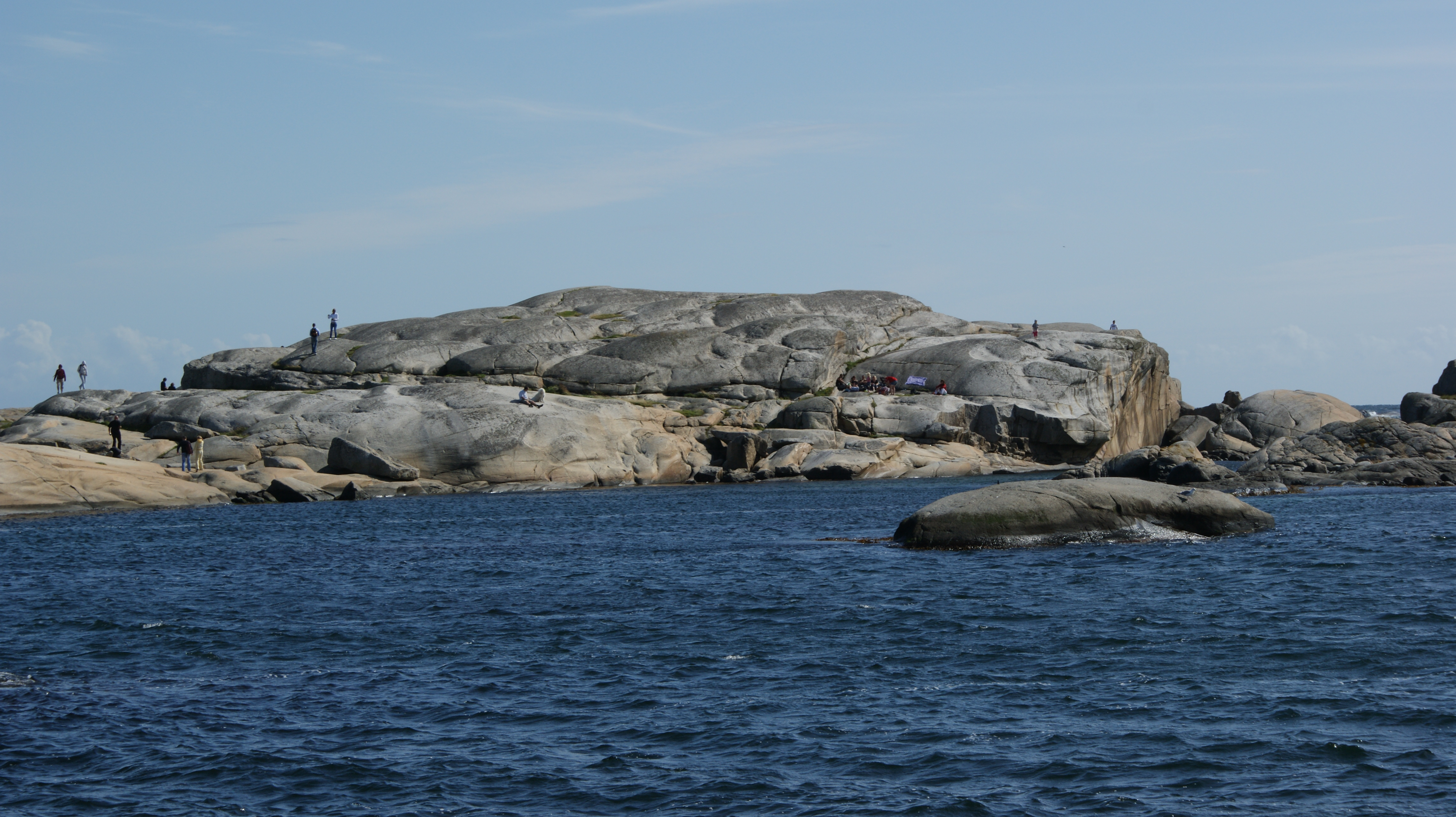
- Verdens Ende at the southern tip of Tjøme
- Interactive map of the island

Geography
- Location: Vestfold, Norway
- Coordinates: 59.12304°N 10.39676°E
- Area: 24.5 km^{2} (9.5 sq mi)
- Length: 13 km (8.1 mi)
- Width: 4 km (2.5 mi)
- Highest elevation: 78 m (256 ft)
- Highest point: Herkelås

Administration
- Norway
- County: Vestfold
- Municipality: Færder Municipality

Tjøme is an island in Færder Municipality in Vestfold county, Norway. The 24.5-square-kilometre (9.5 sq mi) island lies immediately south of the large island of Nøtterøy, between the Ytre Oslofjord (to the east) and the Tønsbergfjorden (to the west). The smaller island of Veierland lies west of the island and Hvasser lies to the east. The island of Tjøme is connected to the islands of Nøtterøy and Hvasser by bridges and the island of Nøtterøy is connected to the mainland by the Tønsberg Canal Bridge.

The island was part of Tjøme Municipality from 1838 until 2018 when it became part of the newly-created Færder Municipality. The main population centre on the island is the village of Tjøme in the central part of the island.

== Nature ==
The landscape of the island is hilly. The highest point on the island is the 78-metre (256 ft) tall hill Herkelås. The bedrock forming the island consists of syenite, and the depressions on the island are covered by sand and clay. The shoreline can be rocky, but there are some beaches as well which draw significant numbers of summer tourists.

== See also ==
- List of islands of Norway
