= Færder Lighthouse =

Coastal lighthouse in Færder, Norway

Færder Lighthouse Færder fyr
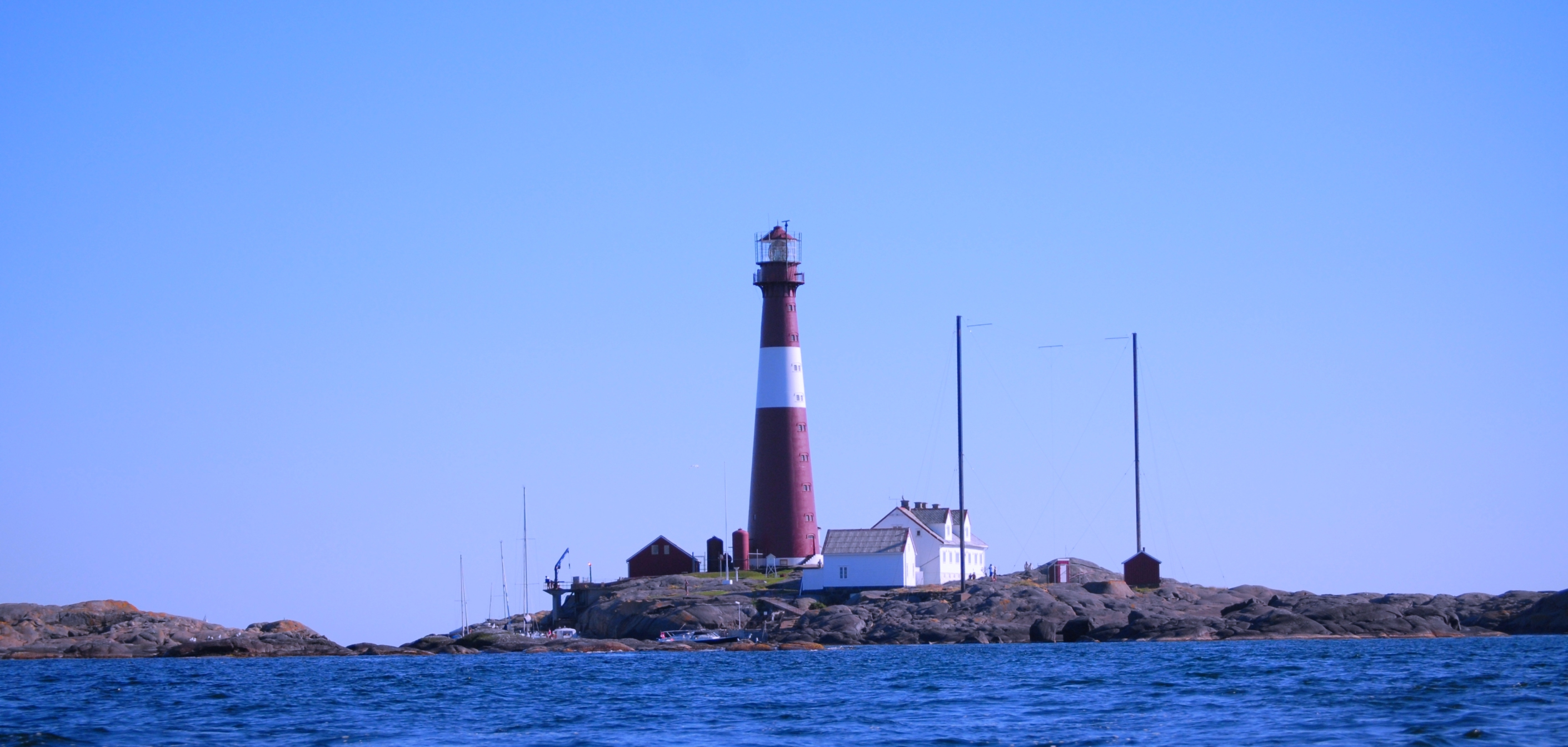
- Location: Tjøme, Færder, Norway
- Coordinates: 59°01′36″N 10°31′29″E

Tower
- Constructed: 1857
- Construction: cast iron (tower)
- Height: 43 m (141 ft)
- Shape: truncated cone
- Markings: Red (tower), Stripe (1, white, horizontal orientation)
- Racon: T

Light
- Focal height: 47 m (154 ft)
- Intensity: 3,570,000 candela
- Range: 19 nmi (35 km; 22 mi)
- Characteristic: Fl(2) W 10s

Færder Lighthouse (Norwegian: Færder fyr) is a coastal lighthouse in Færder Municipality in Vestfold county, Norway. The lighthouse is located on the archipelago Tristein, three small islands in the outer Oslofjord. It was first lit in 1857 as a replacement of the former Store Færder Lighthouse. The lighthouse was listed as a protected site in 1997.

Færder Lighthouse is the second-oldest in Norway.

== Climate ==
Færder has a continental climate (Dfb) that is heavily moderated by the ocean.

Climate data for Færder lighthouse 1991-2020 (6 m, precipitation days 1961-90, extremes 1885-2020)
Month	Jan	Feb	Mar	Apr	May	Jun	Jul	Aug	Sep	Oct	Nov	Dec	Year
Record high °C (°F)	10.7 (51.3)	11.1 (52.0)	17.9 (64.2)	17.5 (63.5)	26 (79)	27.7 (81.9)	28 (82)	28 (82)	24.3 (75.7)	19 (66)	14.5 (58.1)	12.2 (54.0)	28 (82)
Mean daily maximum °C (°F)	2.7 (36.9)	2.1 (35.8)	4.1 (39.4)	8.2 (46.8)	13.5 (56.3)	17.5 (63.5)	19.8 (67.6)	19.5 (67.1)	15.8 (60.4)	11 (52)	7 (45)	4.2 (39.6)	10.5 (50.9)
Daily mean °C (°F)	1 (34)	0.3 (32.5)	2.2 (36.0)	5.9 (42.6)	11 (52)	15 (59)	17.6 (63.7)	17.5 (63.5)	14 (57)	9.4 (48.9)	5.5 (41.9)	2.6 (36.7)	8.5 (47.3)
Mean daily minimum °C (°F)	−0.5 (31.1)	−1 (30)	0.8 (33.4)	4.4 (39.9)	9.1 (48.4)	13.2 (55.8)	15.9 (60.6)	15.8 (60.4)	12.5 (54.5)	7.9 (46.2)	4.1 (39.4)	1 (34)	6.9 (44.5)
Record low °C (°F)	−23 (−9)	−20.8 (−5.4)	−19.5 (−3.1)	−11 (12)	−1.4 (29.5)	1.4 (34.5)	6.7 (44.1)	7.4 (45.3)	1.2 (34.2)	−3.3 (26.1)	−9.5 (14.9)	−18 (0)	−23 (−9)
Average precipitation mm (inches)	60.8 (2.39)	38.9 (1.53)	38.4 (1.51)	40.2 (1.58)	53.1 (2.09)	51.9 (2.04)	53.6 (2.11)	88.6 (3.49)	73.1 (2.88)	92.7 (3.65)	83.9 (3.30)	66 (2.6)	741.2 (29.17)
Average precipitation days (≥ 1.0 mm)	9	7	8	7	8	7	7	9	10	11	11	8	102
Source 1: Norwegian Meteorological Institute
Source 2: NOAA – WMO averages 91-2020 Norway

Climate data for Fæder Fyr 1961-1990, extremes 1959-2011
Month	Jan	Feb	Mar	Apr	May	Jun	Jul	Aug	Sep	Oct	Nov	Dec	Year
Record high °C (°F)	10.7 (51.3)	10.5 (50.9)	12.6 (54.7)	17.5 (63.5)	24.5 (76.1)	27.5 (81.5)	28.0 (82.4)	27.8 (82.0)	23.0 (73.4)	17.6 (63.7)	14.5 (58.1)	12.2 (54.0)	28.0 (82.4)
Mean daily maximum °C (°F)	1.0 (33.8)	0.5 (32.9)	2.8 (37.0)	6.8 (44.2)	12.7 (54.9)	17.6 (63.7)	19.0 (66.2)	18.4 (65.1)	15.0 (59.0)	10.9 (51.6)	6.4 (43.5)	3.3 (37.9)	9.5 (49.2)
Mean daily minimum °C (°F)	−2.2 (28.0)	−3.0 (26.6)	−0.6 (30.9)	2.9 (37.2)	8.3 (46.9)	13.1 (55.6)	14.9 (58.8)	14.6 (58.3)	11.6 (52.9)	7.9 (46.2)	3.2 (37.8)	−0.3 (31.5)	5.9 (42.6)
Record low °C (°F)	−18.2 (−0.8)	−20.8 (−5.4)	−13.0 (8.6)	−6.4 (20.5)	0.5 (32.9)	5.0 (41.0)	8.1 (46.6)	9.3 (48.7)	4.7 (40.5)	−3.3 (26.1)	−9.5 (14.9)	−16.3 (2.7)	−20.8 (−5.4)
Average precipitation mm (inches)	47 (1.9)	36 (1.4)	45 (1.8)	38 (1.5)	50 (2.0)	48 (1.9)	54 (2.1)	73 (2.9)	76 (3.0)	92 (3.6)	80 (3.1)	54 (2.1)	693 (27.3)
Average precipitation days	9.3	6.6	8.0	7.1	7.7	7.4	7.3	9.0	9.8	11.0	11.1	8.3	102.6
Source: Met Norway Eklima

== See also ==
- Lighthouses in Norway
- List of lighthouses in Norway
