= Tjøme =

Tjøme may refer to:

== Places ==
- Tjøme Municipality, a former municipality in Vestfold county, Norway
- Tjøme (village), a village in Færder Municipality in Vestfold county, Norway
- Tjøme (island), an island in Færder Municipality in Vestfold county, Norway
- Tjøme Church, a church in Færder Municipality in Vestfold county, Norway
- Tjøme prestegjeld, a former geographic subdivision of the Church of Norway in Vestfold county

== Other ==
- Tjøme Radio, a coast radio station in Vestfold county, Norway
