= Tønsberg Canal Bridge =

Bridge in Norway

Tønsberg Canal Bridge Tønsberg Kanalbru, Kanalbrua
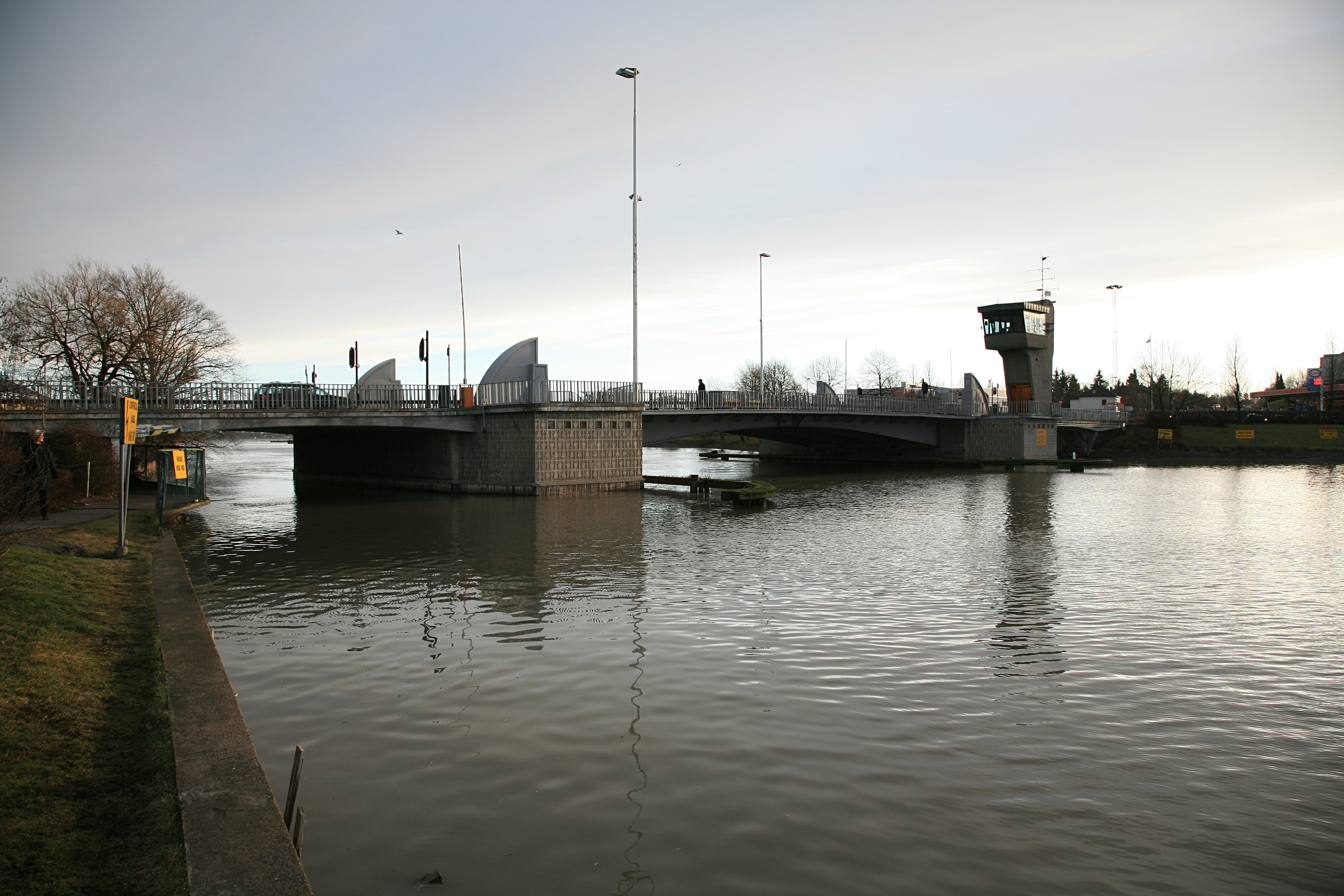
- The bridge seen from the mainland of Tønsberg City.
- Coordinates: 59°15′39″N 10°24′57″E
- Carries: Fv308
- Crosses: Sten Canal
- Locale: Tønsberg, Norway

Characteristics
- Design: Bascule bridge
- Material: Steel
- Total length: 89 metres (292 ft)
- Longest span: 35 metres (115 ft)
- Clearance above: 3 metres (9.8 ft)

History
- Opened: 1957

Tønsberg Canal Bridge (Norwegian: Tønsberg kanalbru or just Kanalbrua) is a double-leaf bascule bridge in Tønsberg Municipality in Vestfold county, Norway. The bridge connects the mainland city of Tønsberg and the part of the city located on the island of Nøtterøy. The bridge crosses the Sten Canal and was built and opened in 1957. The bridge length is 89 metres (292 ft), the main span is 35 metres (115 ft), and the clearance to the sea is 3 metres (9.8 ft). The Tønsberg Canal Bridge usually opens five times daily during the summer seasons, in 9:05 AM, 12:05 AM, 2:05 PM, 6:05 PM, and 8:05 PM.

== Gallery ==
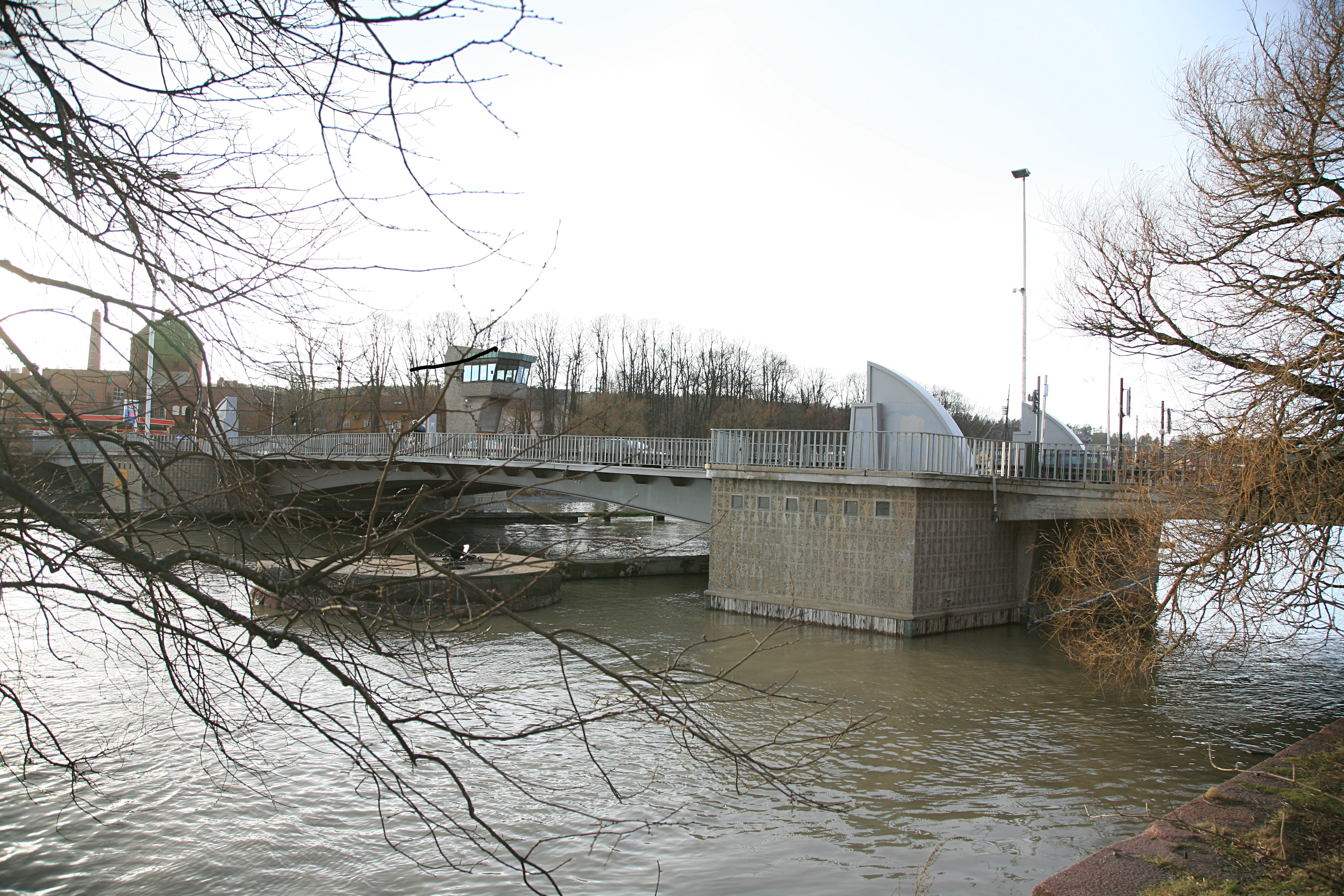
Tønsberg Canal Bridge in 2008.

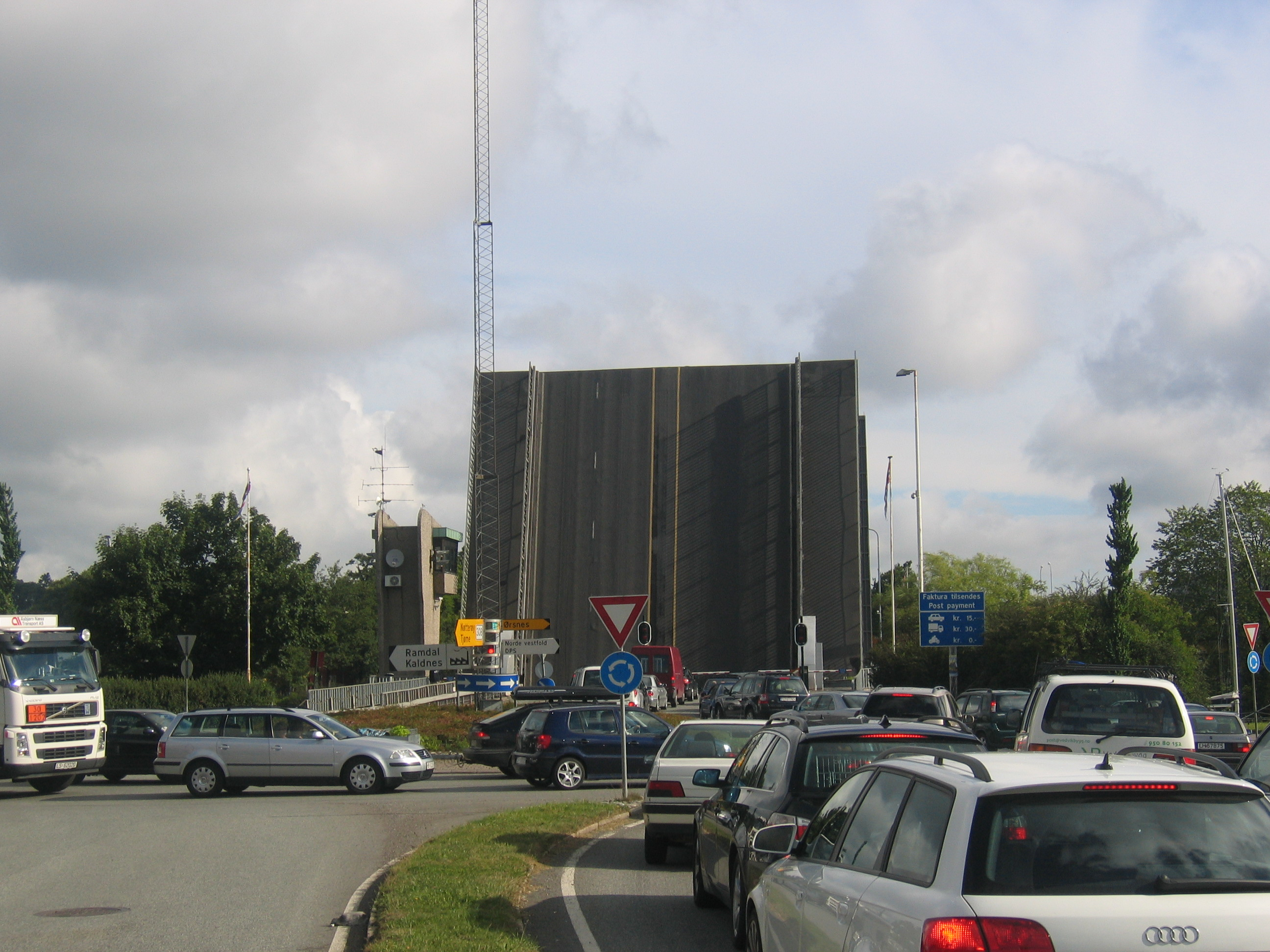
The roundabout on the south side of the bridge.

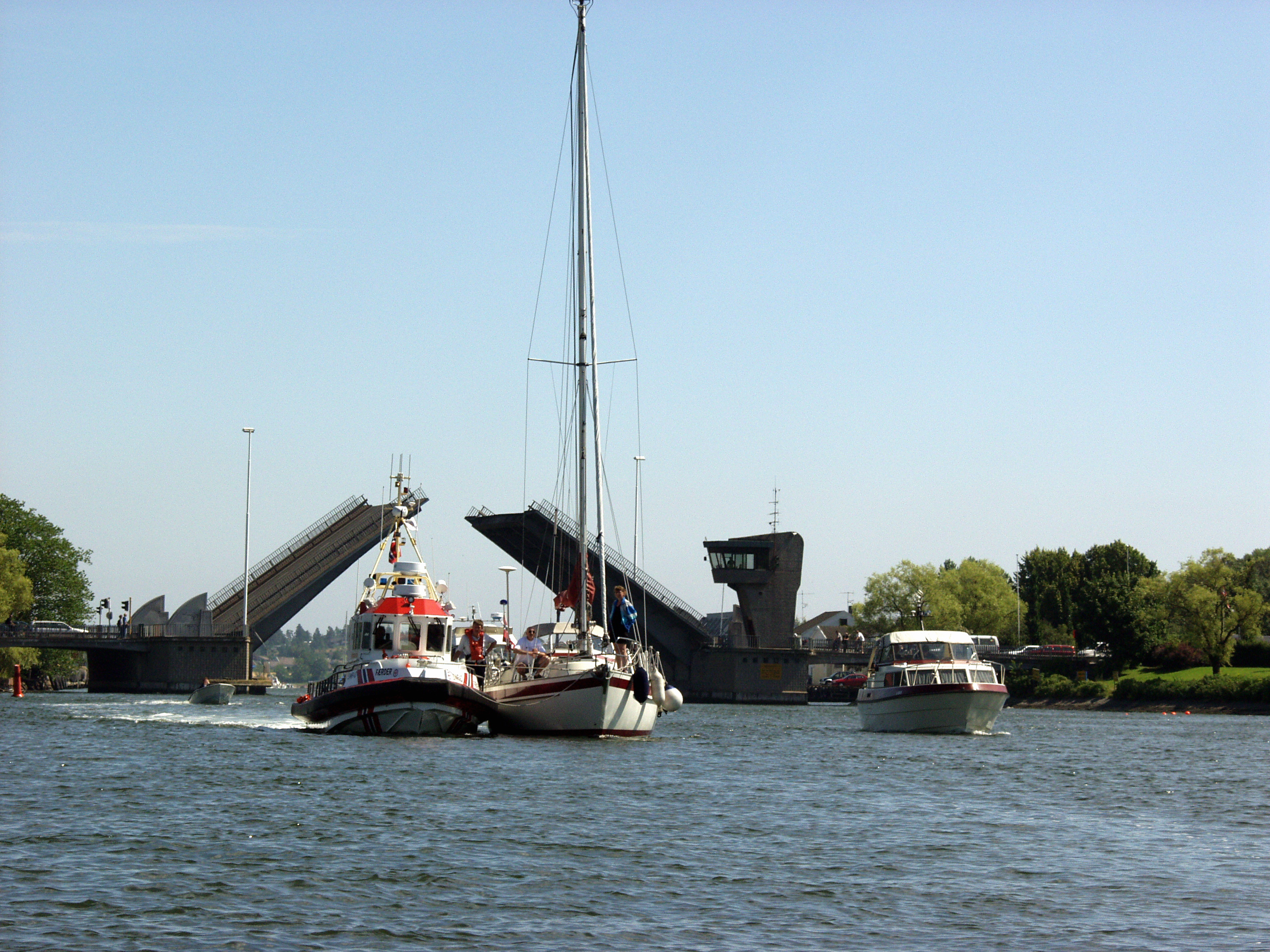
Tønsberg Canal Bridge in 2012.

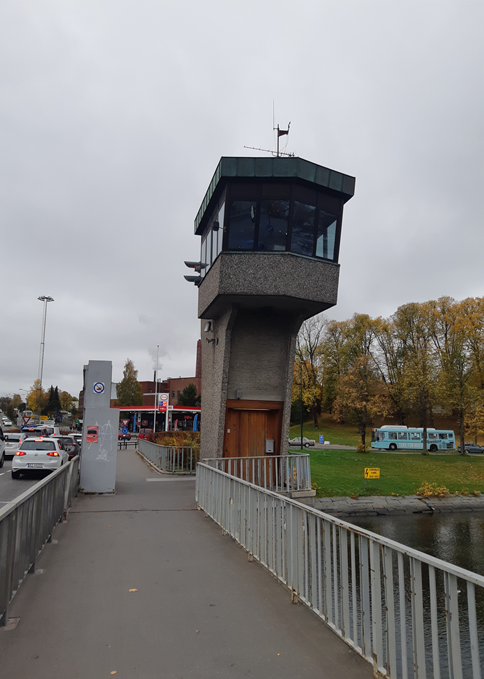
The bridge's control tower that's used to open the two leafs of the bridge.

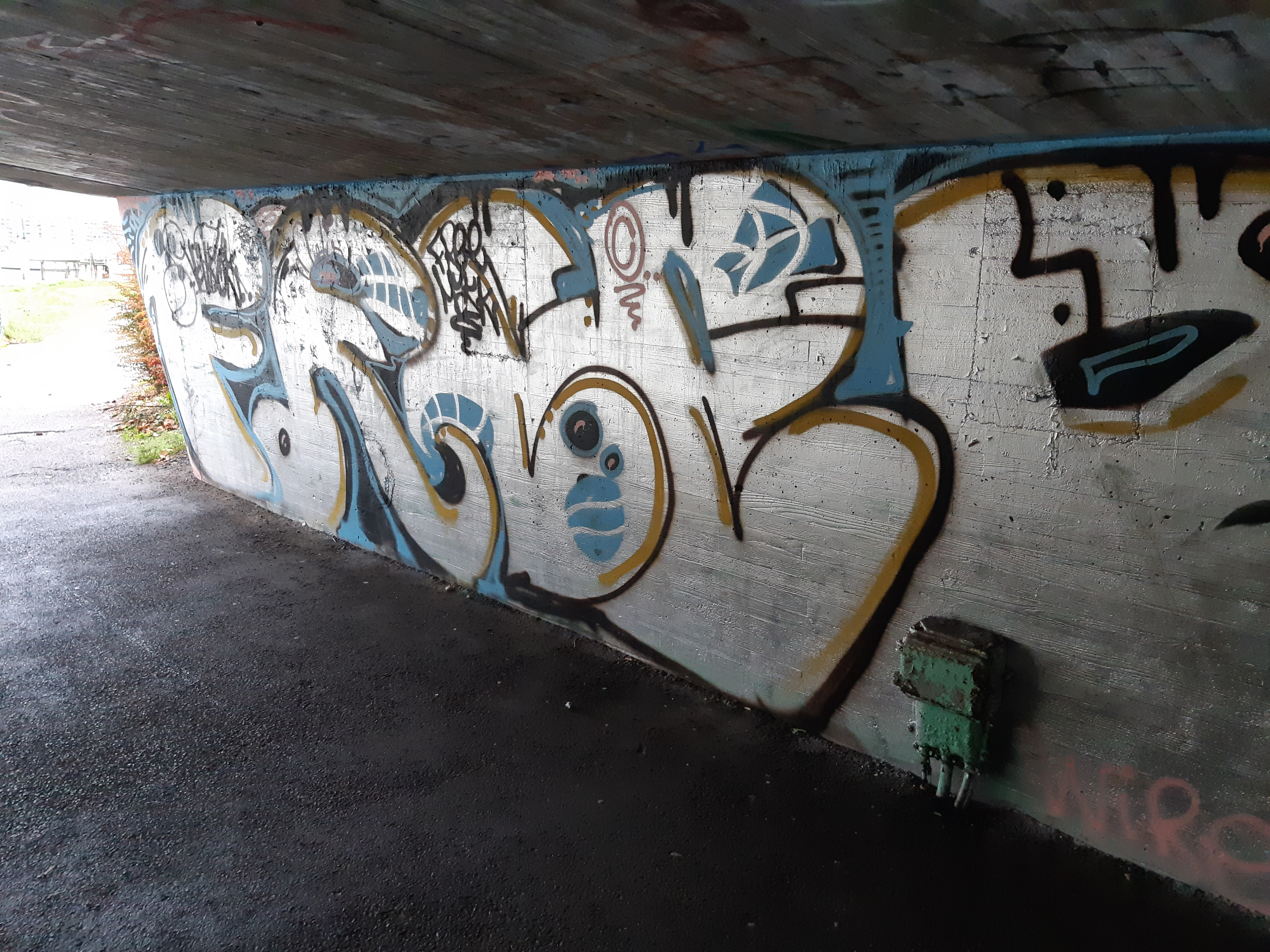
Graffiti under the bridge.
