= List of churches on Falster =

This list of churches in Falster lists churches on the island of Falster, Denmark.

== List ==
Name	Location	Year	Coordinates	Image	Refs
Aastrup Church	Aastrup	c. 1100	54°50′52.44″N 12°05′3.48″E		
Brarup Church	Brarup	C. 1200	54°52′56.28″N 11°28′24.84″E		
Eskilstrup Church	Eskilstrup	c. 1100	54°51′26.63″N 11°52′53.4″E		
Falkerslev Church	Falkerslev	c. 1100	54°50′10.68″N 12°00′0.35″E		
Gedesby Church	Gedesby	c. 1350	54°36′7.56″N 11°56′38.4″E		
Gedser Church	Gedser	1915	54°34′28.55″N 11°55′59.8″E		
Gundslev Church	Gundslev	c. 1100	54°53′48.47″N 11°55′40.43″E		
Gyldenbjerg Church	Orehoved	1889	54°56′27.6″N 11°50′46.31″E		
Horbelev Church	Horbelev	c. 1200	54°49′40.43″N 12°03′28.44″E		
Horreby Church	Horreby	c. 1100	54°48′18.37″N 11°59′37.32″E		
Idestrup Church	Idestrup	c. 1100	54°44′32.28″N 11°57′29.15″E		
Karleby Church	Karleby	c. 1100	54°47′28.32″N 12°01′47.63″E		
Kippinge Church	Kippinge	13th century	54°54′25.55″N 11°47′30.12″E		
Lillebrænde Church	Lillebrænde	1100	54°52′45.48″N 11°58′28.56″E		
Maglebrænde Church	Maglebrænde	1400	54°51′41.04″N 12°01′4.8″E		
Nykøbing Abbey Church	Nykøbing	1419	54°45′56.32″N 11°52′9.82″E		
Nørre Alslev Church	Nørre Alslev	c. 1300	54°53′54.24″N 11°52′24.24″E		
Nørre Kirkeby Church	Nørre Kirkeby	12th century	54°39′53.4″N 11°43′56.33″E		
Nørre Ørslev Church	Nørre Ørslev	c. 1250	54°47′23.27″N 11°57′48.24″E		
Skelby Church	Skelby	c. 1250	54°48′0.8″N 11°38′5.9″E		
Strandkirken	Marienlyst	1959	54°40′42.59″N 11°57′41.39″E		
Stubbekøbing Church	Stubbekøbing	c. 1200	54°53′24.72″N 12°02′38.76″E		
Systofte Church	Systofte				
Sønder Alslev Church	Sønder Alslev	c. 1200	54°45′44.6″N 12°00′09.7″E		
Sønder Kirkeby Church	Sønder Kirkeby	1100	54°46′13.44″N 11°58′38.99″E		
Tingsted Church	Tingsted	c. 1170	54°48′48.96″N 11°54′30.6″E		
Torkilstrup Church	Torkilstrup	c. 1100	54°52′15.6″N 11°55′51.23″E		
Væggerløse Church	Væggerløse	c. 1100	65°42′42.12″N 11°55′19.2″E		
Vålse Church	Vålse	c. 1100	64°55′40.07″N 11°46′37.56″E		

== See also ==
- List of churches on Bornholm
- List of churches on Lolland
