= Sydfalster =

Former municipality in Denmark

Coordinates: 54°42′39″N 11°55′31″E

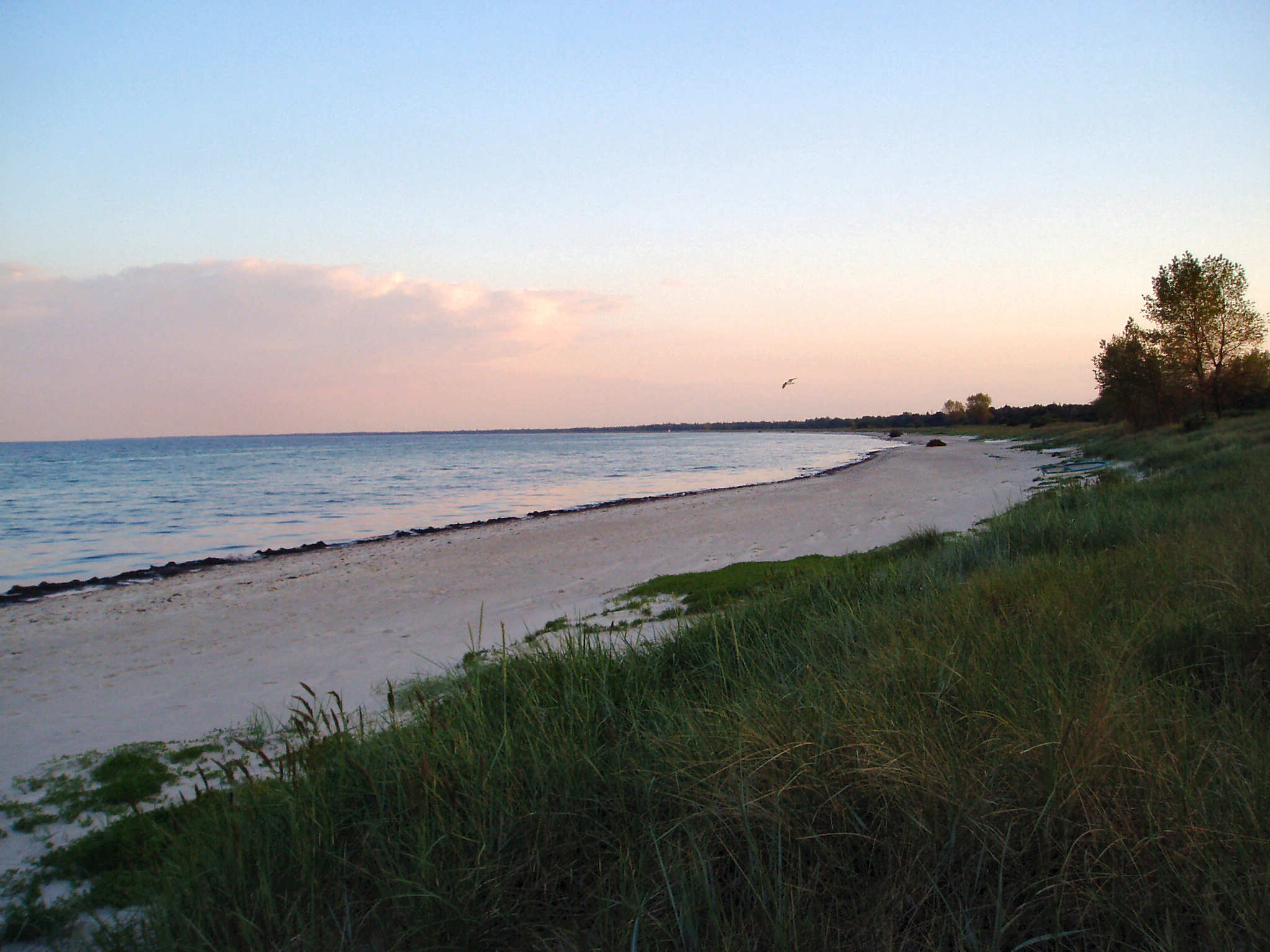
The beach of Marielyst

Until 1 January 2007 Sydfalster was a municipality (Danish, kommune) in the former Storstrøm County on the southern end of the island of Falster in south Denmark.

== Overview ==
The municipality covered an area of 113 km^{2}, and had a total population of 6,953 (2005), which was approx. quadrupled in the summer months, when tourists come to the beaches and resorts of the east coast of the island. Its last mayor was Hans Aage Petersen, a member of the Conservative People's Party (Det Konservative Folkeparti) political party.

The site of its municipal council was the town of Væggerløse. Other towns in the municipality were Bøtø By, Gedesby Strand, Gedser, Idestrup, Marielyst, Nykøbing Strandhuse, and Skelby.

Gedser Odde ("Point Gedser") at the island's far southern end is Denmark's southernmost point.

Ferry service connects the former municipality at the town of Gedser to Rostock, Germany over the Baltic Sea.

== Municipality Reform 2007 ==
Sydfalster municipality ceased to exist as the result of Kommunalreformen ("The Municipality Reform" of 2007). It was merged with Nykøbing Falster, Nysted, Nørre Alslev, Sakskøbing, and Stubbekøbing municipalities to form the new Guldborgsund municipality. This created a municipality with an area of 907 km^{2} and a total population of 63,533 (2005). The new municipality belongs to Region Sjælland ("Zealand Region").
