= Nykøbing Strandhuse =

- Town
- Location on Falster
- Coordinates: 54°39′39″N 11°57′01″E
- Country: Denmark
- Region: Zealand (Sjælland)
- Municipality: Guldborgsund

Population (2026)
  - Total: 303
- Time zone: UTC+1 (CET)
  - Summer (DST): UTC+2 (CEST)

Nykøbing Strandhuse is a coastal village and summer house development located 3 kilometres (1.9 mi) south of Marielyst and 8 kilometres (5.0 mi) southeast of Væggerløse on the Danish island of Falster. As of 2026, it has a population of 303.
