= Nagelsti =

- Town
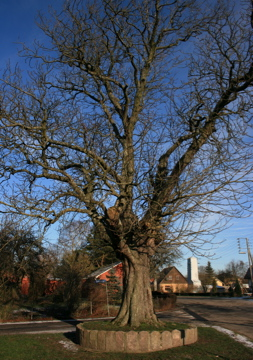
- Nagelsti village tree

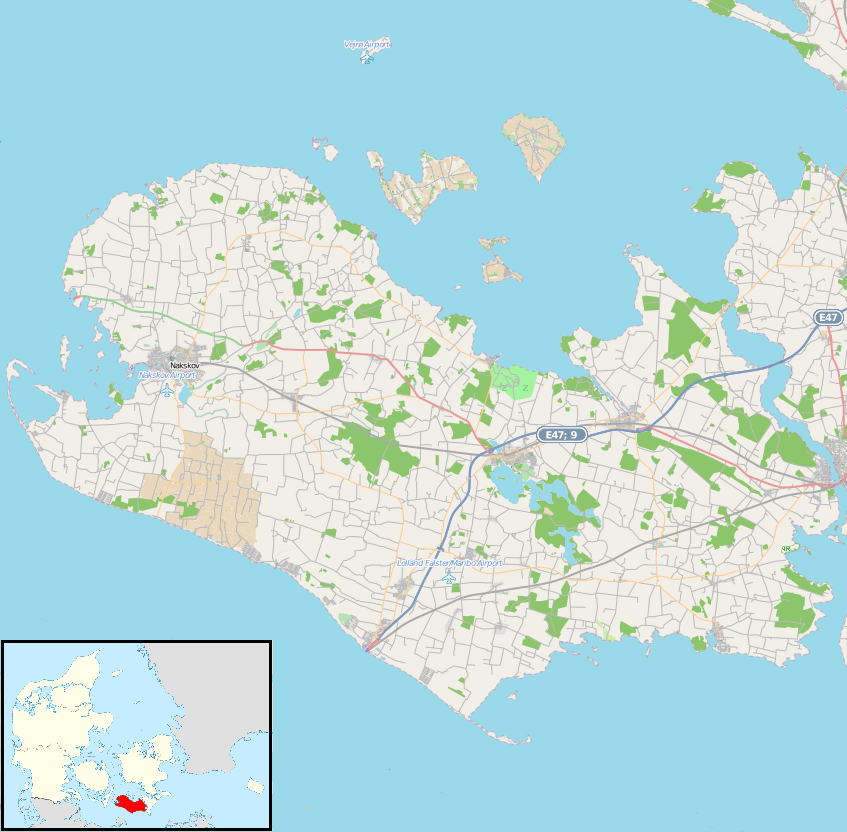
- Location on Lolland
- Coordinates: 54°44′47″N 11°50′30″E
- Country: Denmark
- Region: Zealand (Sjælland)
- Municipality: Guldborgsund

Population (2026)
  - Total: 532
- Time zone: UTC+1 (CET)
  - Summer (DST): UTC+2 (CEST)

Nagelsti is a village in Guldborgsund Municipality on the Danish island of Lolland some 4 km southwest of Nykøbing. As of 2026, it has a population of 532.

== Landmarks ==
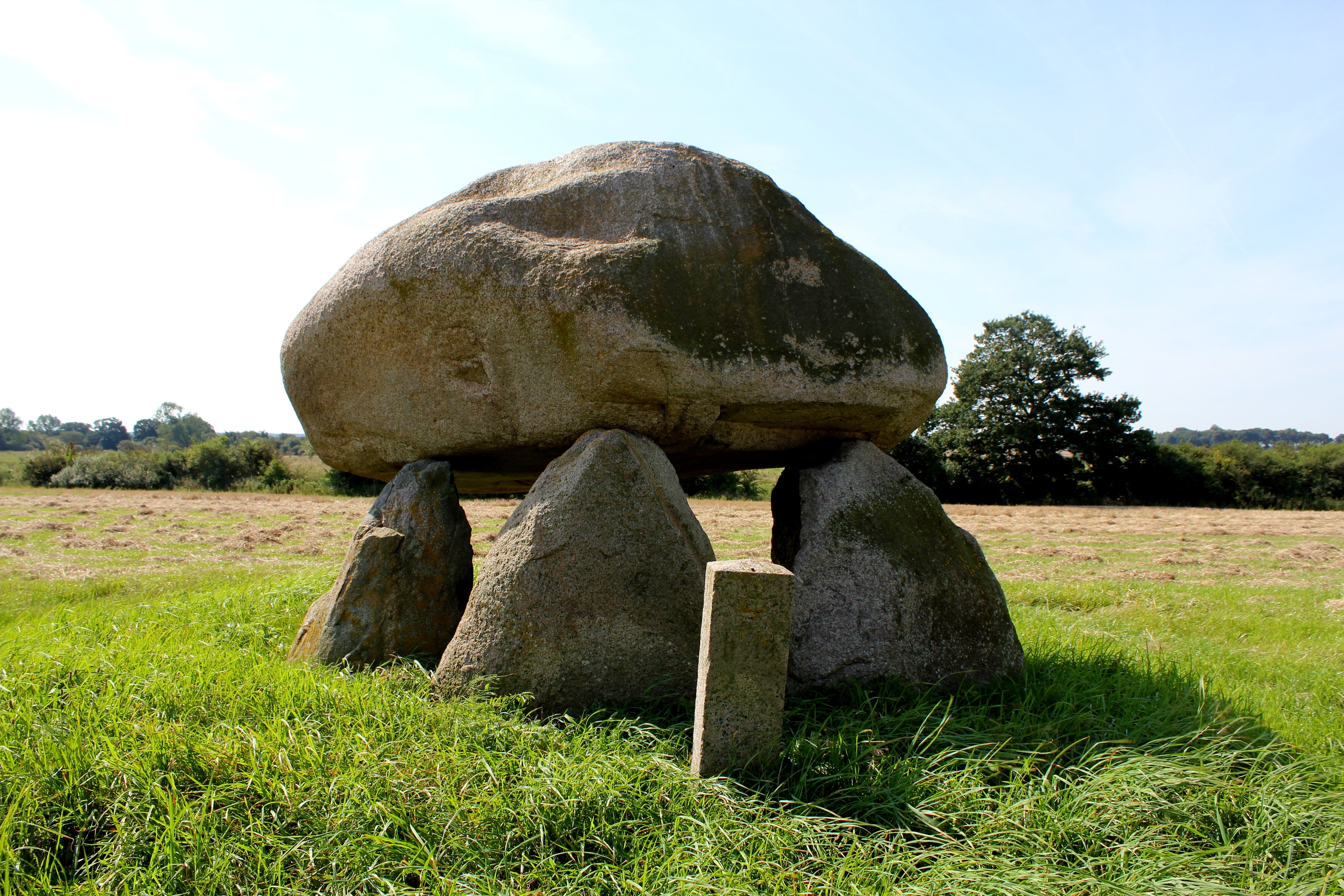
Nagelsti Dolmen

A chestnut tree planted in 1834 stands at the centre of the village. The Nagelsti Dolmen, some 2 km east of the village, dates from c. 3000 BC. The Nagelsti Elektrisitetsværk (power supply station) was opened in 1912.

== Fauna and flora ==
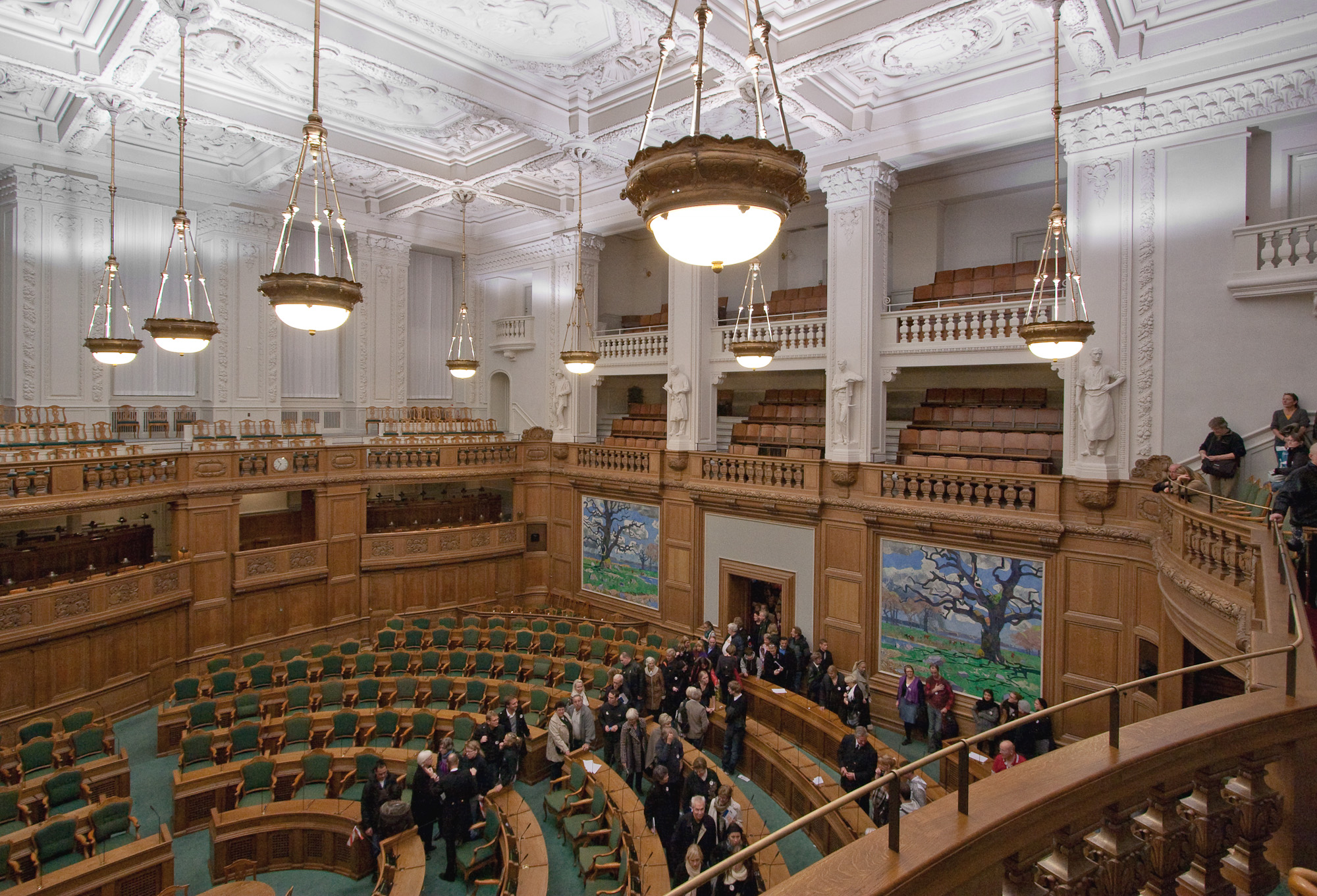
Paintings of Skejten in the Folketing

The Priorskov-Flintehorne area between the village and the coast is noted for its wild celery, deer, and especially its bird life with ducks, geese, swans and coots attracted by the shallow waters.

The Skejten nature reserve, located between Nagelsti and Kettinge, features oak trees up to 350 years old. Paintings of Skejten by Olaf Rude now decorate the Folketing debating chamber in Copenhagen.
