= Guldborgsund Municipality =

Guldborgsund Municipality Guldborgsund Kommune (Danish)
- Municipality
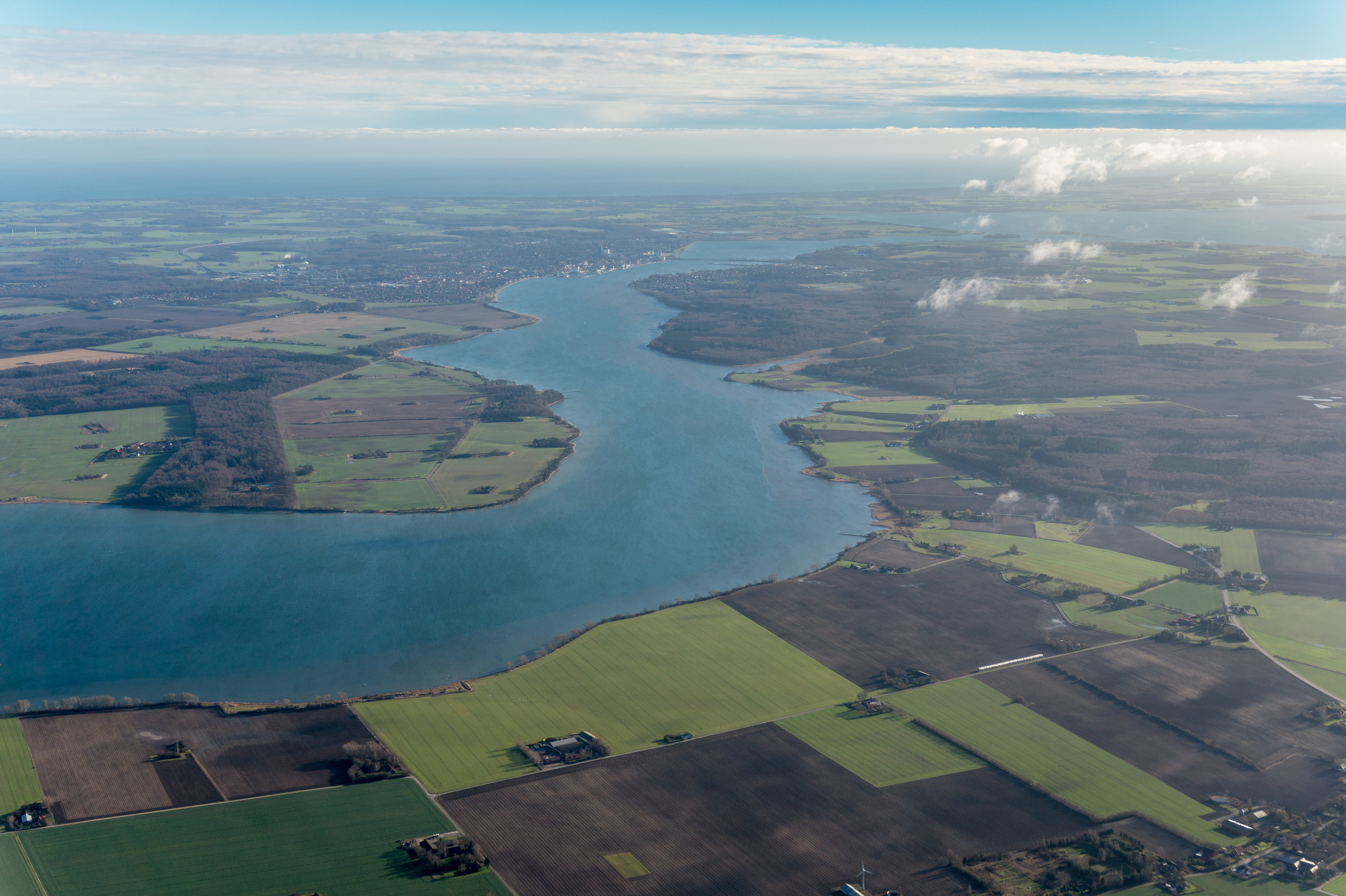

- Coat of arms

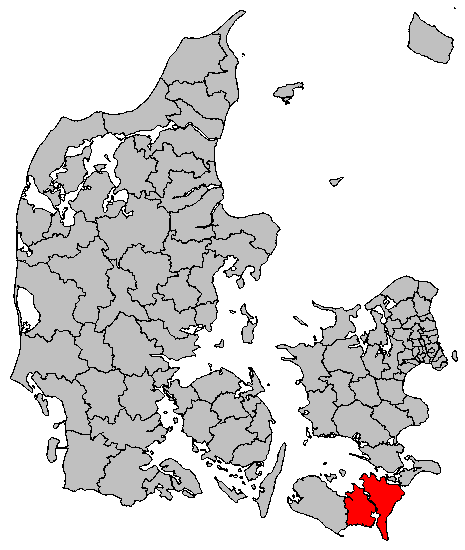
- Coordinates: 54°46′11″N 11°52′57″E
- Country: Denmark
- Region: Zealand
- Established: 1 January 2007
- Seat: Nykøbing Falster

Government
  - Mayor: Simon Hansen (Social Democrats)

Area
  - Total: 903.15 km^{2} (348.71 sq mi)

Population (1 January 2026)
  - Total: 59,119
  - Density: 65.459/km^{2} (169.54/sq mi)
- Time zone: UTC+1 (CET)
  - Summer (DST): UTC+2 (CEST)
- Postal code: 4800–4992
- Municipal code: 376
- Website: www.guldborgsund.dk

Guldborgsund Municipality (Danish: Guldborgsund Kommune) is a kommune in the Region Sjælland in south-east Denmark, created on 1 January 2007 from six former municipalities on the two islands Lolland in the west and Falster in the east bordering the Guldborgsund strait. It covers an area of 903.15 km^{2} (2013) and has a total population of 59,119 (1 January 2026). Its neighboring municipalities are Lolland to the west and Vordingborg to the north. Its administrative seat is in the town of Nykøbing Falster. Its mayor as of 1 January 2022 is Simon Hansen, representing the Social Democrats.

The southernmost point in Denmark, Gedser Odde, is located in the municipality.

== History ==
On Monday January 1, 2007 Guldborgsund municipality was created as the result of Kommunalreformen ("The Municipal Reform" of 2007), consisting of the six former municipalities of Nykøbing Falster (located partly on the island of Falster and partly on Lolland (its Sundby section)), Nørre Alslev (Falster), Stubbekøbing (Falster), and Sydfalster (Falster) and two of the six former municipalities located on the island of Lolland: Sakskøbing and Nysted.

== Politics ==
Guldborgsund's municipal council consists of 29 members, elected every four years. The municipal council has six political committees.

=== Municipal council ===
Below are the municipal councils elected since the Municipal Reform of 2007.

Election	Party									Total seats	Turnout	Elected mayor
Election	A	B	C	F	G	O	U	V	Ø	Total seats	Turnout	Elected mayor
2005	11	1	3	2	5	2		5		29	72.5%	Kaj Petersen (A)
2009	7		2	5	4	4	1	6		29	67.1%	John Brædder (G)
2013	9		1	1	6	7		4	1	29	74.3%	John Brædder (G)
2017	6			1	11	7		3	1	29	72.1%	John Brædder (G)
Data from Kmdvalg.dk 2005, 2009, 2013 and 2017

== Economy ==
The largest company headquartered in the municipality is Codan Medical in Nysted, although its activities are actually concentrated in Rødbyhavn in neighbouring Lolland Municipality.

== Localities ==
Nykøbing Falster	16,405
Sakskøbing	4,784
Sundby	2,953
Nørre Alslev	2,414
Stubbekøbing	2,305
Nordbyen	1,748
Nysted	1,384

Væggerløse	1,334
Idestrup	1,330
Eskilstrup	1,105
Gedser	835
Marielyst	776
Toreby	617
Guldborg	587

Horbelev	586
Kettinge	530
Nagelsti	523
Orehoved	424
Ønslev	376
Nykøbing Strandhuse	332
Systofte Skovby	329

Horreby	303
Sønder Vedby Skovhuse	287
Øster Kippinge	269
Øster Ulslev	252
Tingsted	228
Hasselø Plantage	215
Sløsse	50

== Tourism ==
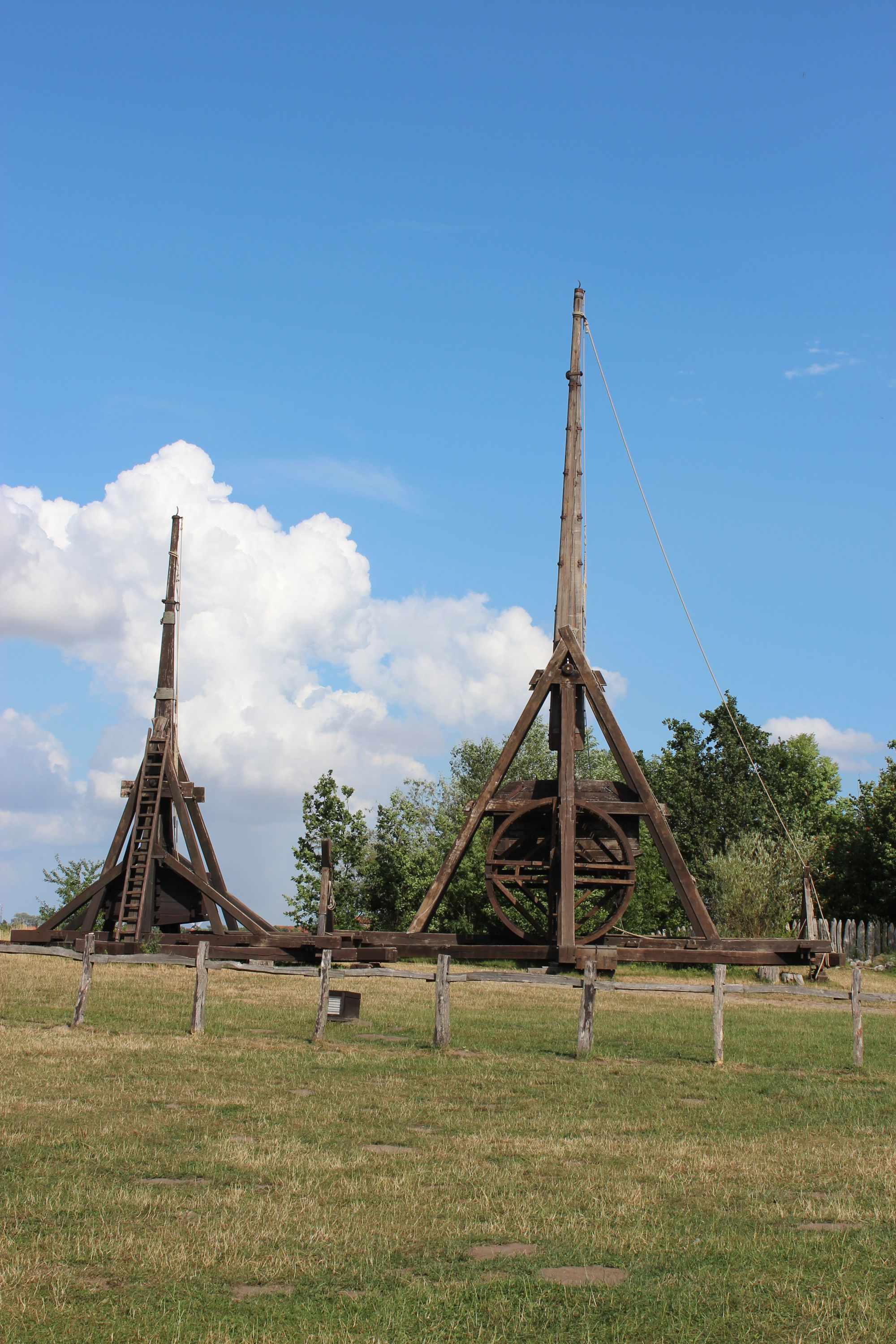
Trebuchets at Middelaldercentret

Among the largest tourist attraction in the municipality is Middelaldercentret just outside Nykøbing Falster, which is an open-air museum built as a medieval town with houses and weaponry from around 1400. In Nysted is Aalholm, which is a privately owned castle. Fuglsang Art Museum holds a notable collection of Danish art from the end of the 18th century until today. In Marielyst on eastern Falster is a large summer house area and long sandy beaches.

== Twin towns – sister cities ==
Guldborgsund is twinned with:

- Eutin, Germany
- Iisalmi, Finland
- Liepāja, Latvia
- Rostock, Germany
