= Sløsse =

Village in Guldborgsund Municipality, Denmark

Coordinates: 54°42′N 11°36′E

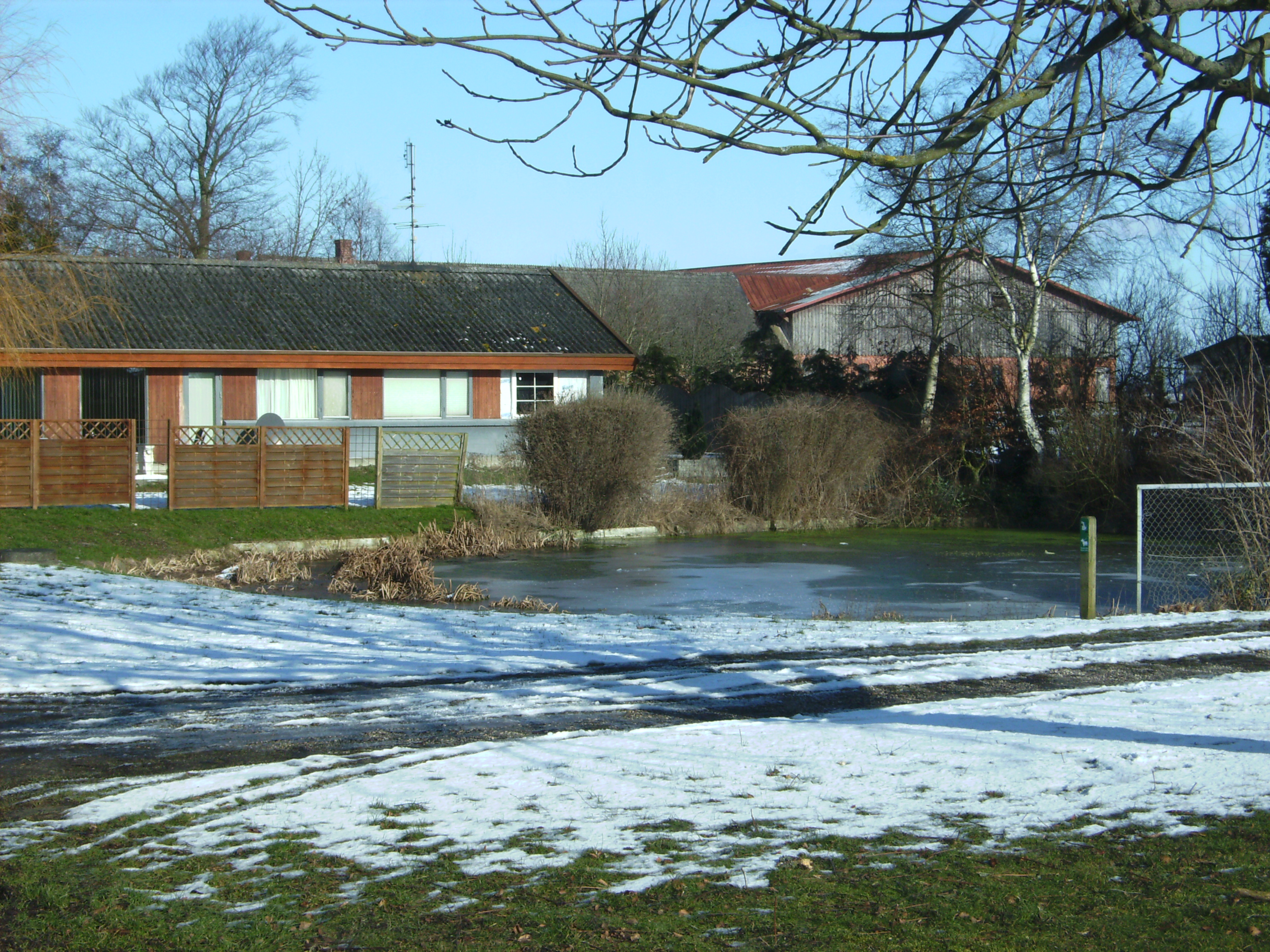
The local pond, Sløsse in Lolland

Sløsse is a small village in Guldborgsund Municipality on the island of Lolland in southern Denmark. The population is between 25 and 50 residents. Written records of Sløsse date back to the mid-19th century, when the population was recorded at 414. The village is surrounded by countryside, and most of the buildings are old timberwork houses and farms.

Peribaea setinervis, a tachnid fly rare in Scandinavia, was found in Sløsse.
