= Sakskøbing =

- Town
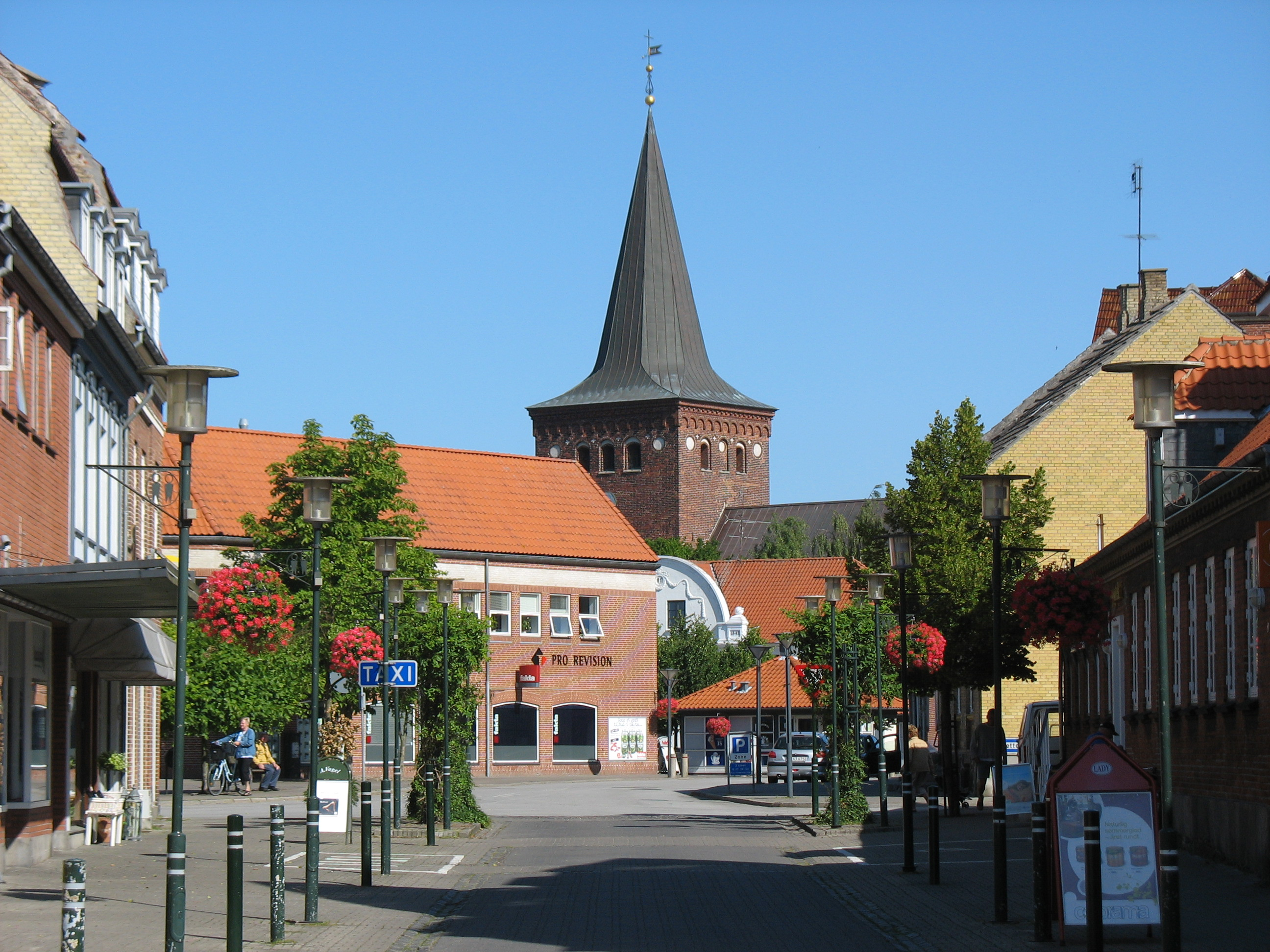
- Pedestrian zone in Sakskøbing

- Coat of arms

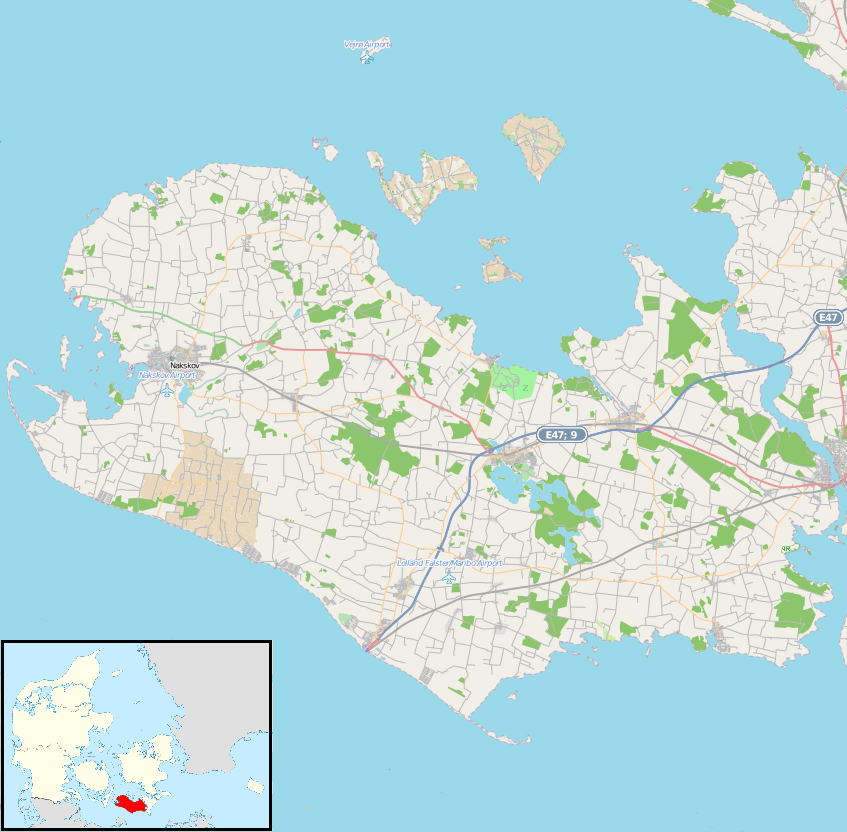
- Location on Lolland Sakskøbing (Denmark Region Zealand) Sakskøbing (Denmark)
- Coordinates: 54°48′N 11°38′E
- Country: Denmark
- Region: Region Sjælland
- Municipality: Guldborgsund Municipality

Area
  - Urban: 3.51 km^{2} (1.36 sq mi)

Population (2026)
  - Urban: 4,580
  - Urban density: 1,300/km^{2} (3,380/sq mi)
  - Gender: 2,231 males and 2,349 females
- Time zone: UTC+1 (CET)
  - Summer (DST): UTC+2 (CEST)
- Postal code: DK-4990 Sakskøbing

Sakskøbing (Danish pronunciation: [ˈsɑksˌkʰøˀpe̝ŋ]), previously spelled Sakskjøbing, is a town on the island of Lolland in south Denmark. It has a population of 4,580 (1 January 2026). Until 1 January 2007 it was the seat of the former Sakskøbing Municipality (Danish: kommune), and is now situated in Guldborgsund Municipality in Region Sjælland.

The town is located on the northeast coast of Lolland where the Sakskøbing River flows into the Sakskøbing Fjord, a narrow but navigable sea inlet, the innermost part of which constitutes the port of Sakskøbing. Mentioned for the first time in 1240, it arose as a ford over the river, and is referred to as a market town as early as 1270.

== History ==
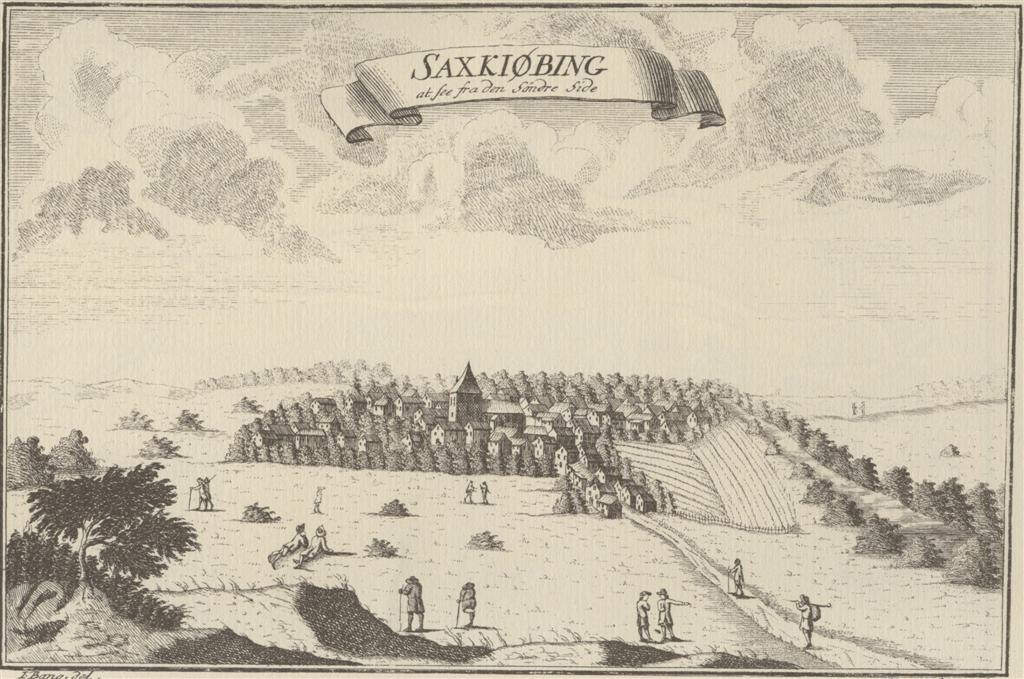
Historical prospect of Sakskøbing

The town is mentioned for the first time as "Saxakopingh" in the Danish Census Book from 1240. Already in 1270 it was referred to as a market town together with the town of Nakskov in Western Lolland. In the Middle Ages, Sakskøbing was a mint, where the coins were minted with the two sheep shears known from the town's coat of arms. Before he was king, King Christopher II of Denmark (1276–1332) resided in Sakskøbing from 1289 to 1315 when he was Duke of Lolland, and again in his last years. The town suffered from several fires, including in 1728, 1784 and 1800. In 1874, Sakskøbing was connected to the Danish rail network as the Lollandsbanen railway line between Nykøbing Falster and Nakskov was opened.

== Geography ==
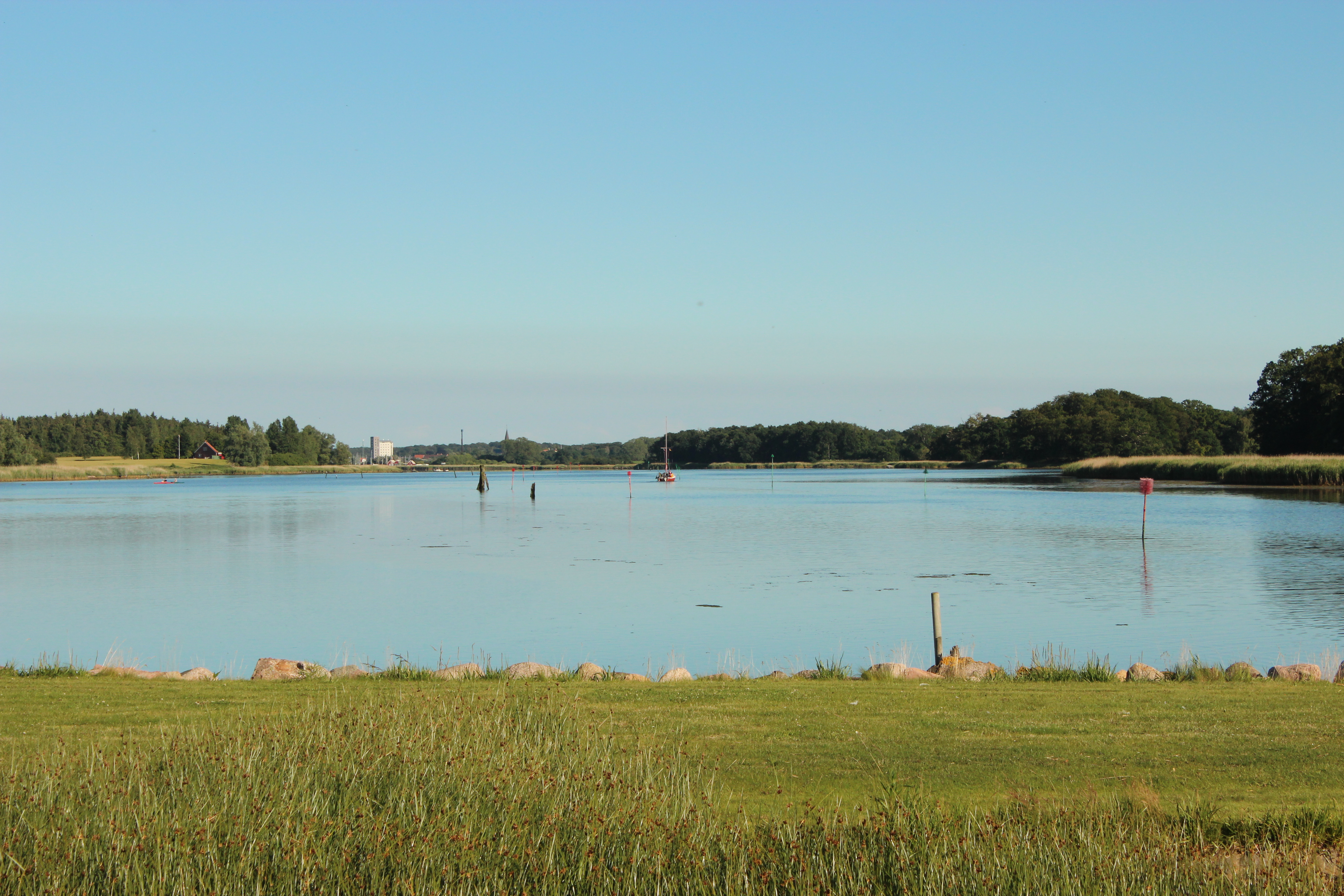
Sakskøbing Fjord seen towards Sakskøbing.

Sakskøbing is located on the north-eastern part of the island of Lolland in a flat and fertile moraine landscape. The town is located by a tunnel valley, a glacial terrain formation which runs from Sakskøbing in the northwest to the Guldborgsund strait in the southeast. It is located where the Sakskøbing River (Danish: Sakskøbing Å) empties into the Sakskøbing Fjord, an approximately 8 km (5.0 mi) long narrow and navigable inlet of Smålandsfarvandet, the body of water between the islands of Zealand, Lolland, Falster and Møn, and which on the last stretch to Sakskøbing narrows completely so that it looks more like a river than a inlet.

== Landmarks ==
=== Sakskøbing Church ===
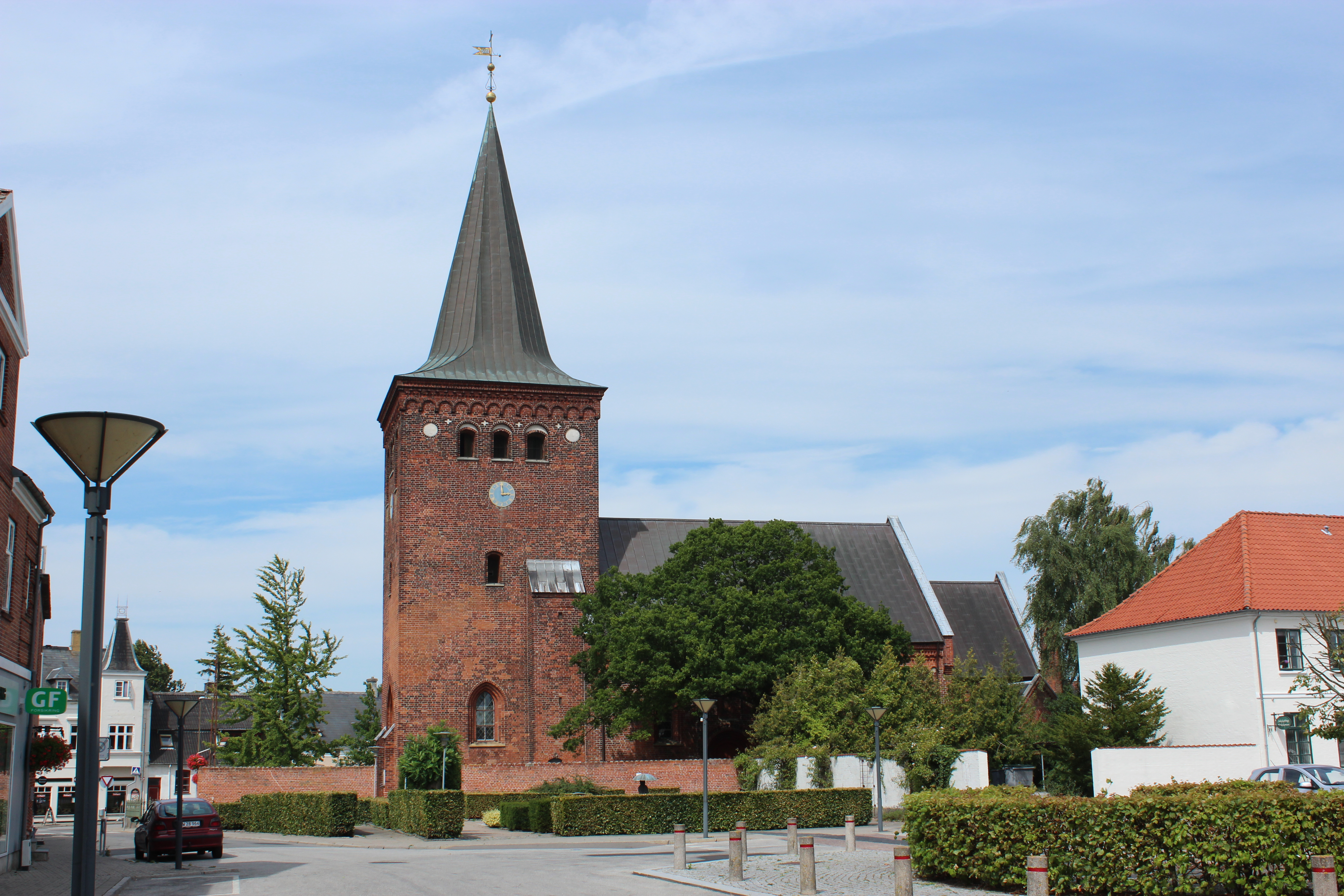
Sakskøbing Church

Sakskøbing Church is a late Romanesque brick building with a late Gothic tower. It was built around the year 1200; in the following centuries, the original church was extended with a nave and tower. The altarpiece, which dates back to the 16th century, is a late Gothic wood carving work from Lübeck. The present spire, which is 48 metres high, was built in 1852.

=== Water tower ===
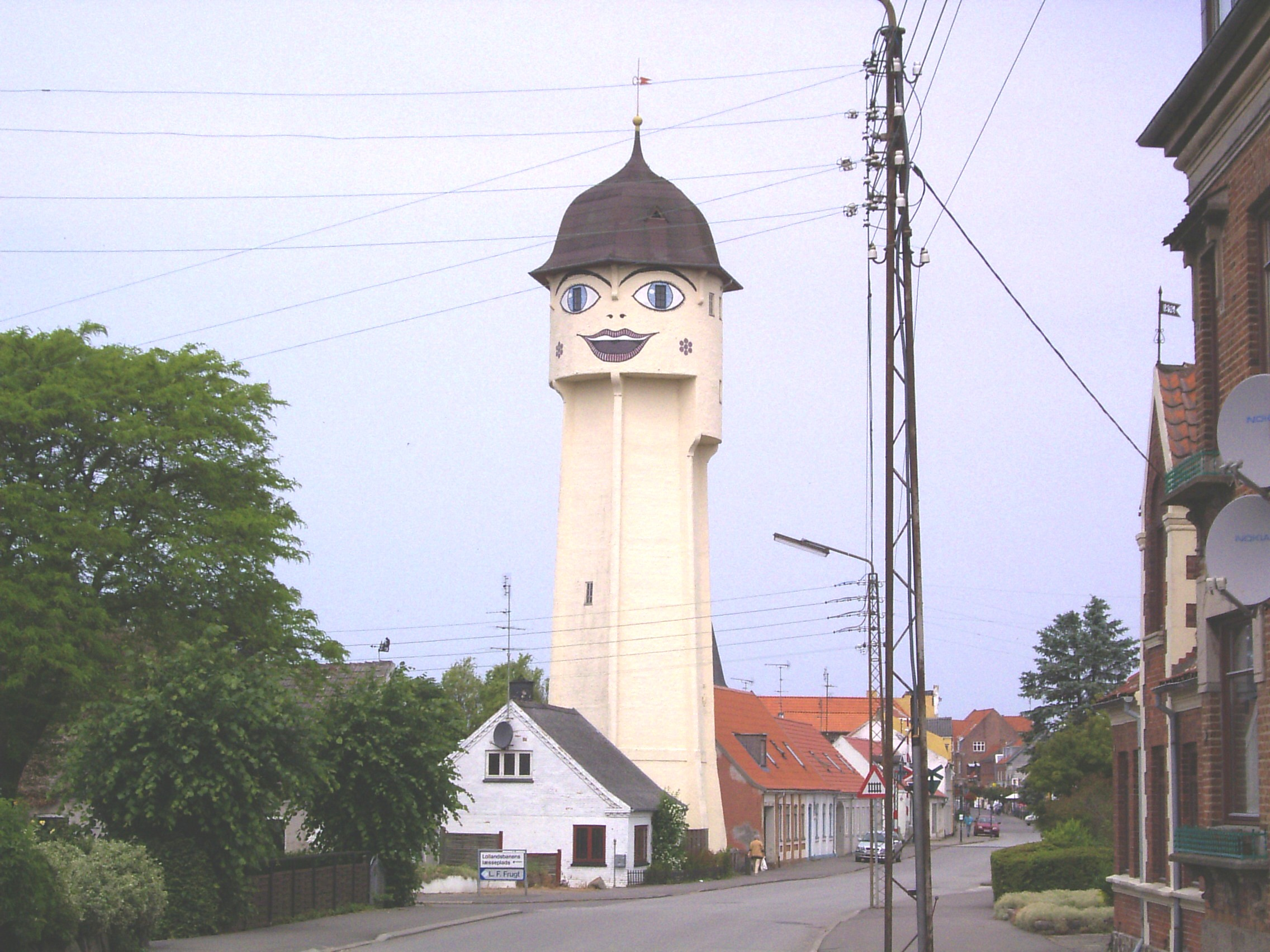
The water tower "Saxine" in Sakskøbing.

The water tower in Sakskøbing, nicknamed "Saxine" or "the smiling water tower", is a 33-meter-tall (108 ft) water tower and a landmark for the town. The tower was built in 1908 by Christiani & Nielsen, but did not receive its smile until 1982, when the architect Flemming Skude decorated it.

== Sakskøbing Municipality ==
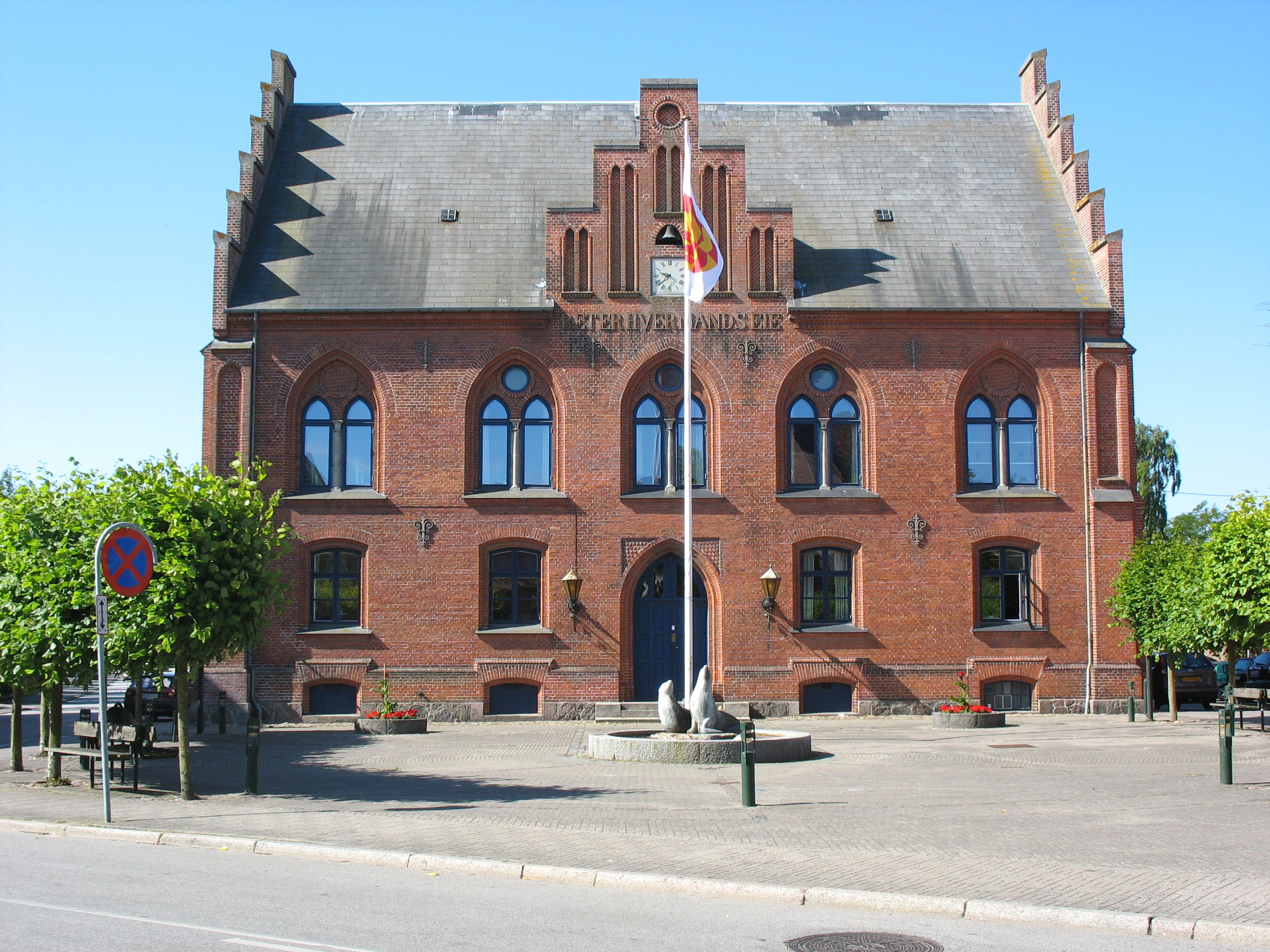
The old town hall in Sakskøbing.

The former Sakskøbing Municipality, including the small island of Vigsø, covered an area of 176 km^{2}, and had a total population of 9,299 (2005). Its last mayor was Kaj Petersen a member of the Social Democrats (Socialdemokraterne) political party. To the north is Tår's Cove (Tårs Vig) and beyond that Rågø Strait (Rågø Sund), the waterway which separates Lolland from Zealand. A finger of Rågø Strait cuts into the former municipality forming Sakskøbing Fjord and then Sakskøbing River (Sakskøbing å) which meanders through the former municipality, as well as through Nykøbing Falster and Nysted until it terminates near the town of Bregninge.

On 1 January 2007 Sakskøbing Municipality ceased to exist as the result of Kommunalreformen ("The Municipality Reform" of 2007). It was merged with existing Nykøbing Falster, Nysted, Nørre Alslev, Stubbekøbing, and Sydfalster municipalities to form the new Guldborgsund Municipality. This created a municipality with an area of 907 km^{2} and a total population of 63,533 (2005). The new municipality belongs to Region Sjælland (Region Zealand).

== Transport and infrastructure ==
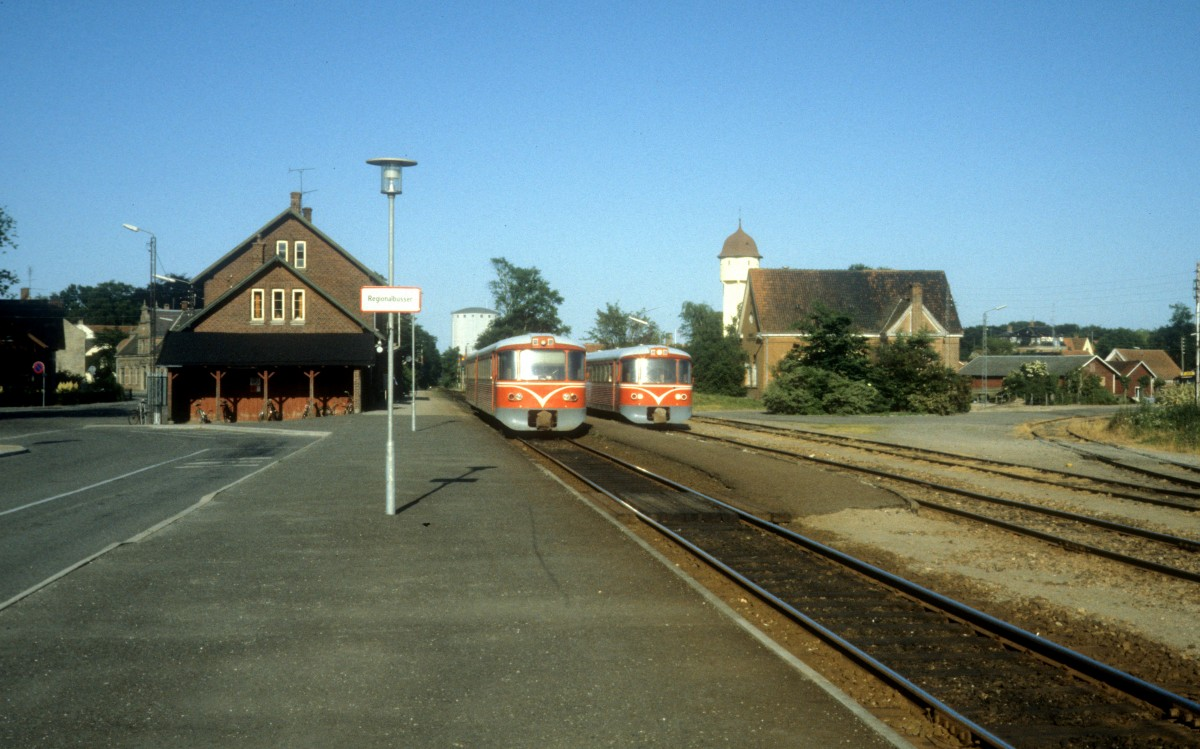
Sakskøbing railway station

The town is served by Sakskøbing railway station, located on Lollandsbanen, a railway line between Nykøbing Falster and Nakskov, which is operated by the railway company Lokaltog A/S since 2015.

Sakskøbing is located on European route E47 connecting Lübeck in Germany to Helsingborg in Sweden via Copenhagen, as well as the Danish national road 9 connecting Odense on Funen to Nykøbing Falster on Falster by way of Funen, Langeland and Lolland.

Lolland Falster Airport is located south of Sakskøbing between the towns of Holeby and Rødby.

== Notable people ==
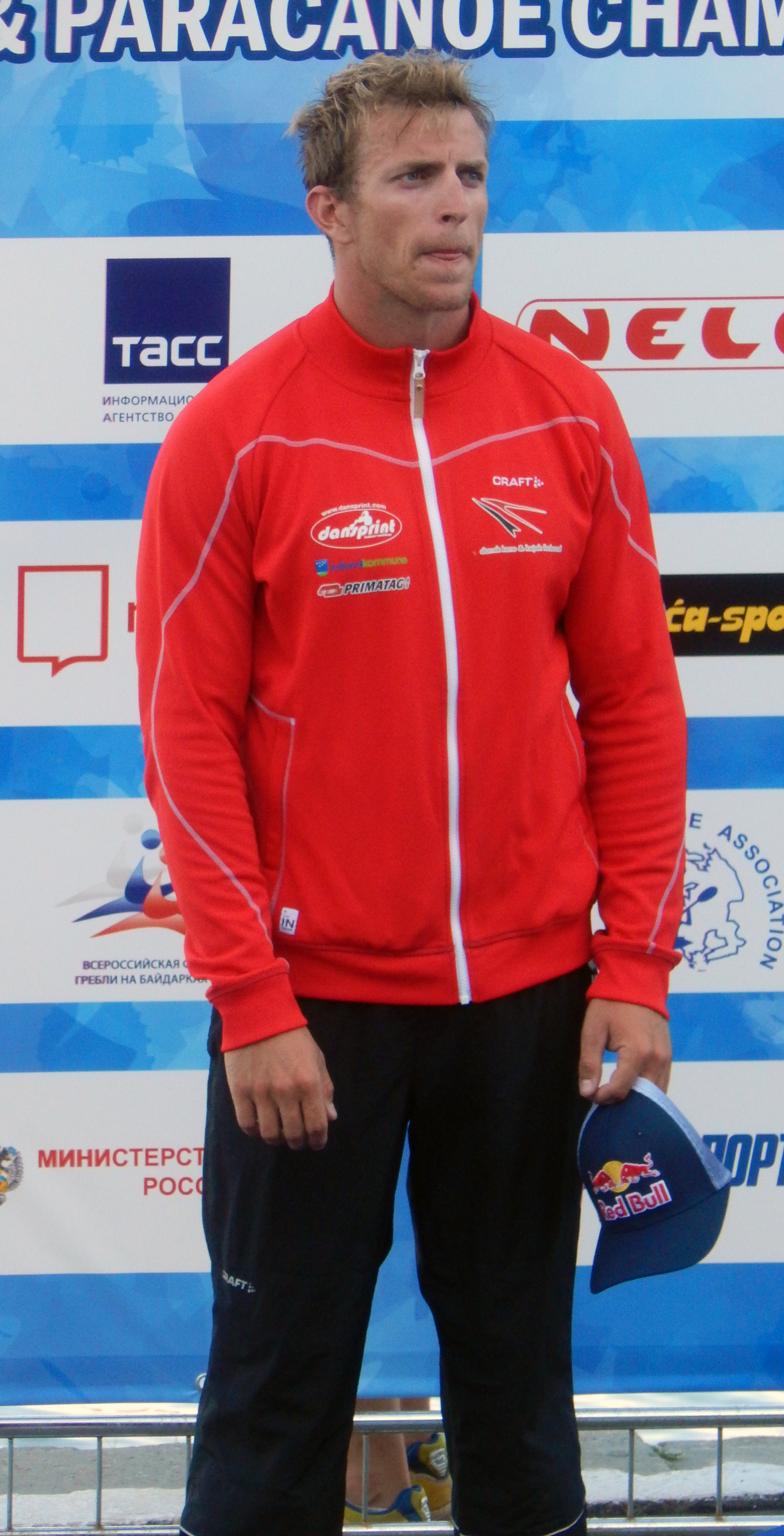
René Holten Poulsen, 2016

- Christopher II of Denmark (1276–1332), King of Denmark 1320 to 1326 and 1329 to 1332. He was given a simple house at Sakskøbing shortly before his death.
- Peter Ilsted (1861–1933), a Danish artist and printmaker of domestic interior scenes
- Jon Iversen (1889–1964), a Danish stage and film actor and film director
- Philip R. Rosendahl (1893–1974), journalist and acting governor of North Greenland 1925 to 1928 and Governor 1929 to 1939
- Svend Erik Hovmand (born 1945), a Danish politician. He was Tax Minister 2001 to 2004.
- Troels Gustavsen (born 1988), a Danish singer/songwriter

=== Sport ===
- Carl Andersen (1879–1967), a Danish gymnast who competed in the 1908 Summer Olympics and became a neo-baroque architect
- Arnold Schwartz (1901–1975), a Danish rower. He competed at the 1928 Summer Olympics.
- Berit Kristensen (born 1983), a Danish team handball player. He plays for Randers HK and Denmark.
- René Holten Poulsen (born 1988), a sprint canoeist, silver medallist at the 2008 Summer Olympics
- Jens Stryger Larsen (born 1991), a footballer who plays for Malmö and has 54 caps for Denmark
