= Kettinge =

- Town
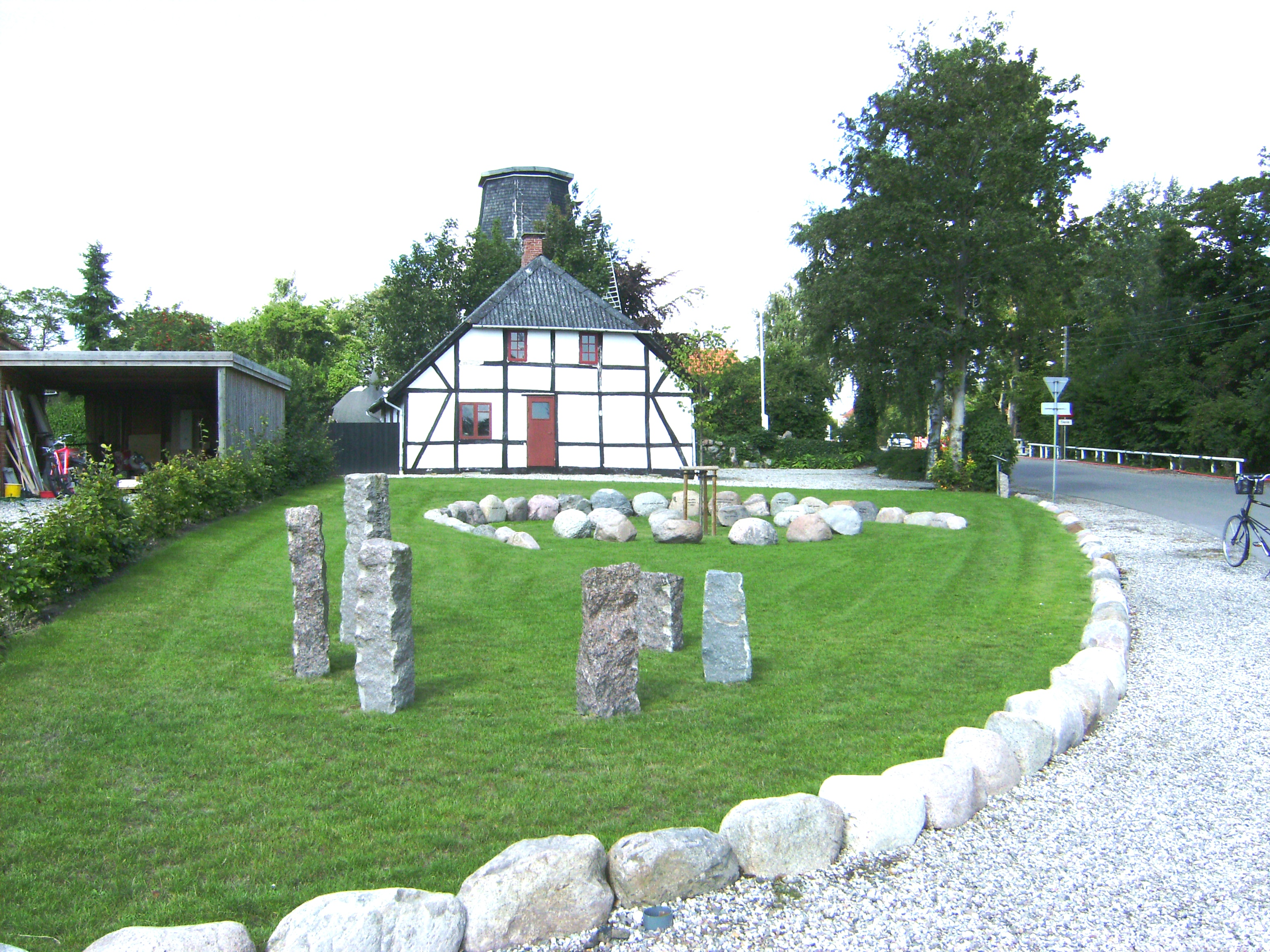
- Kettinge Bylav, the village moot

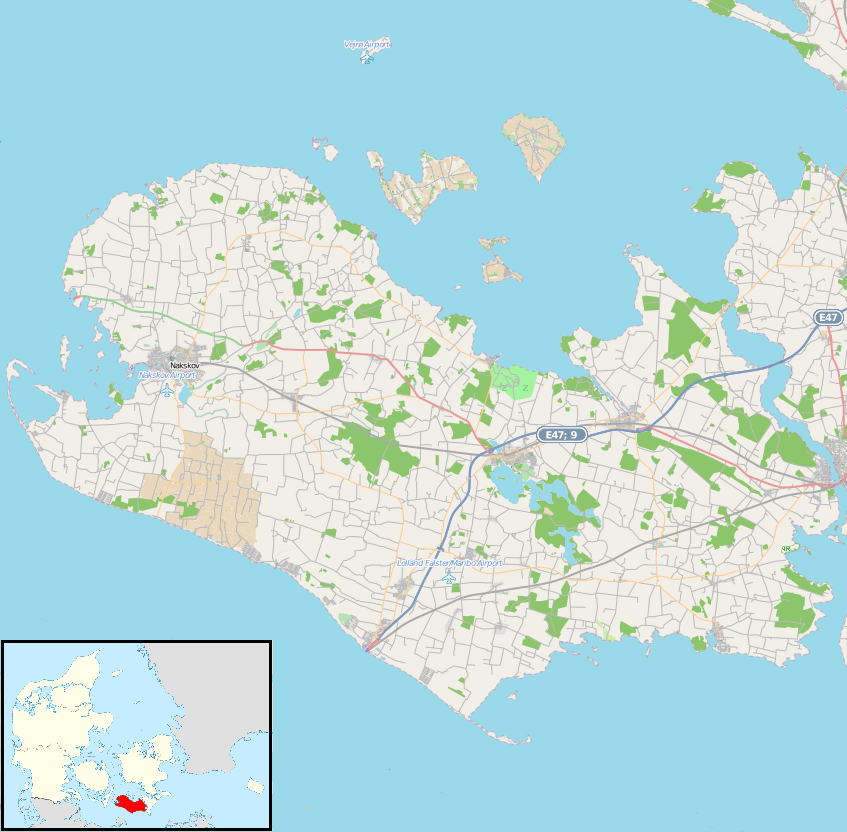
- Location on Lolland
- Coordinates: 54°41′47″N 11°43′43″E
- Country: Denmark
- Region: Zealand (Sjælland)
- Municipality: Guldborgsund

Population (1. January 2026)
  - Total: 529
- Time zone: UTC+1 (CET)
  - Summer (DST): UTC+2 (CEST)

Kettinge is a village and parish in southeastern Lolland, Denmark. It belongs to Guldborgsund Municipality, in Region Zealand. As of 2026 the village has a population of 529.

== Etymology ==
The name comes from kat (cat) and the ending inge and means "place with cats". The ending also indicates the place originated in the Iron Age before 600 AD.

== History ==
Kettinge Church still bears traces of a Romanesque nave and chancel, showing it was built around 1200. It is best known for its frescos painted by the Elmelunde Master c. 1500. The present Kettinge Mølle (Kettinge Windmill) dates from 1891, replacing an even older post mill. From 1909 until c. 1960, Kettinge was a railway station on the line from Nysted to Nykøbing. At the beginning of the 20th century, the village flourished with shops, an electric power station, a brickworks and a sawmill.

== The village today ==
Although most of the old businesses have now closed, Kettinge has a day nursery, a sports hall and an open-air swimming pool. "Kettinge Bylav" is the name given to the old tingsted or moot near the windmill, marking the place where the village elders used to meet to take administrative decisions. It has recently been renewed, as has the mill itself.

== Surroundings ==
Kettinge is only 4 km (2.5 mi) from Nysted with its castle, shops and beach. Many prehistoric remains can be seen in Frejlevs Oldtidsskov. Kettinge Grusgrav, an old quarry, has hills, lakes, riding tracks and walking paths and includes Troelshøj, Lolland's highest point.
