= Sønder Vedby Skovhuse =

- Town
- Location on Falster
- Coordinates: 54°45′40″N 11°54′46″E
- Country: Denmark
- Region: Zealand (Sjælland)
- Municipality: Guldborgsund

Population (2026)
  - Total: 299
- Time zone: UTC+1 (CET)
  - Summer (DST): UTC+2 (CEST)

Sønder Vedby Skovhuse is a village 4 kilometres (2.5 mi) east of Nykøbing on the Danish island of Falster. Today it serves as a satellite village for Nykøbing. As of 2026, it has a population of 299.

== History ==
With time, the south side of Sønder Vedby was acquired by Orupgård. Around 1900, an impressive two-storey building, partly half-timbered, was built for the estate's kvægforvalteren or cattle administrator. For many years it was used as a roebørnehave, a day nursery for children whose parents were picking sugarbeet in the surrounding fields.
