= Nordbyen =

- Town
- Location on Falster Nordbyen (Denmark Region Zealand) Nordbyen (Denmark)
- Coordinates: 54°48′10″N 11°52′57″E
- Country: Denmark
- Region: Zealand (Sjælland)
- Municipality: Guldborgsund

Area
  - Urban: 1.3 km^{2} (0.50 sq mi)

Population (2026)
  - Urban: 1,999
  - Urban density: 1,500/km^{2} (4,000/sq mi)
- Time zone: UTC+1 (CET)
  - Summer (DST): UTC+2 (CEST)

Nordbyen is a satellite town some 5 kilometres (3.1 mi) north of Nykøbing Falster on the Danish island of Falster. It was formed on 1 January 2007 bringing together the districts of Bangsebro, Møllehave and Stubberup. As of 2026, it has a population of 1,999.
