= Hasselø Plantage =

- Town
- Location on Falster
- Coordinates: 54°44′24″N 11°52′41″E
- Country: Denmark
- Region: Zealand (Sjælland)
- Municipality: Guldborgsund

Population (2026)
  - Total: 210
- Time zone: UTC+1 (CET)
  - Summer (DST): UTC+2 (CEST)

Hasselø Plantage is a coastal village located 4 kilometres (2.5 mi) south of Nykøbing on the Danish island of Falster. As of 2026, it has a population of 210

== History ==
Hasselø was once an island but since dikes were built in 1873 it has been a part of Falster. Around 1600, on the initiative of Queen Sophie, the wife of King Frederick II, a colony of Dutchmen was established on Hasselø to supply Nykøbing Palace with vegetables. During the Second World War, the German military operated a radar station and surveillance facilities in Hasselø.
