= Jonas Kamper =

Danish footballer (born 1983)

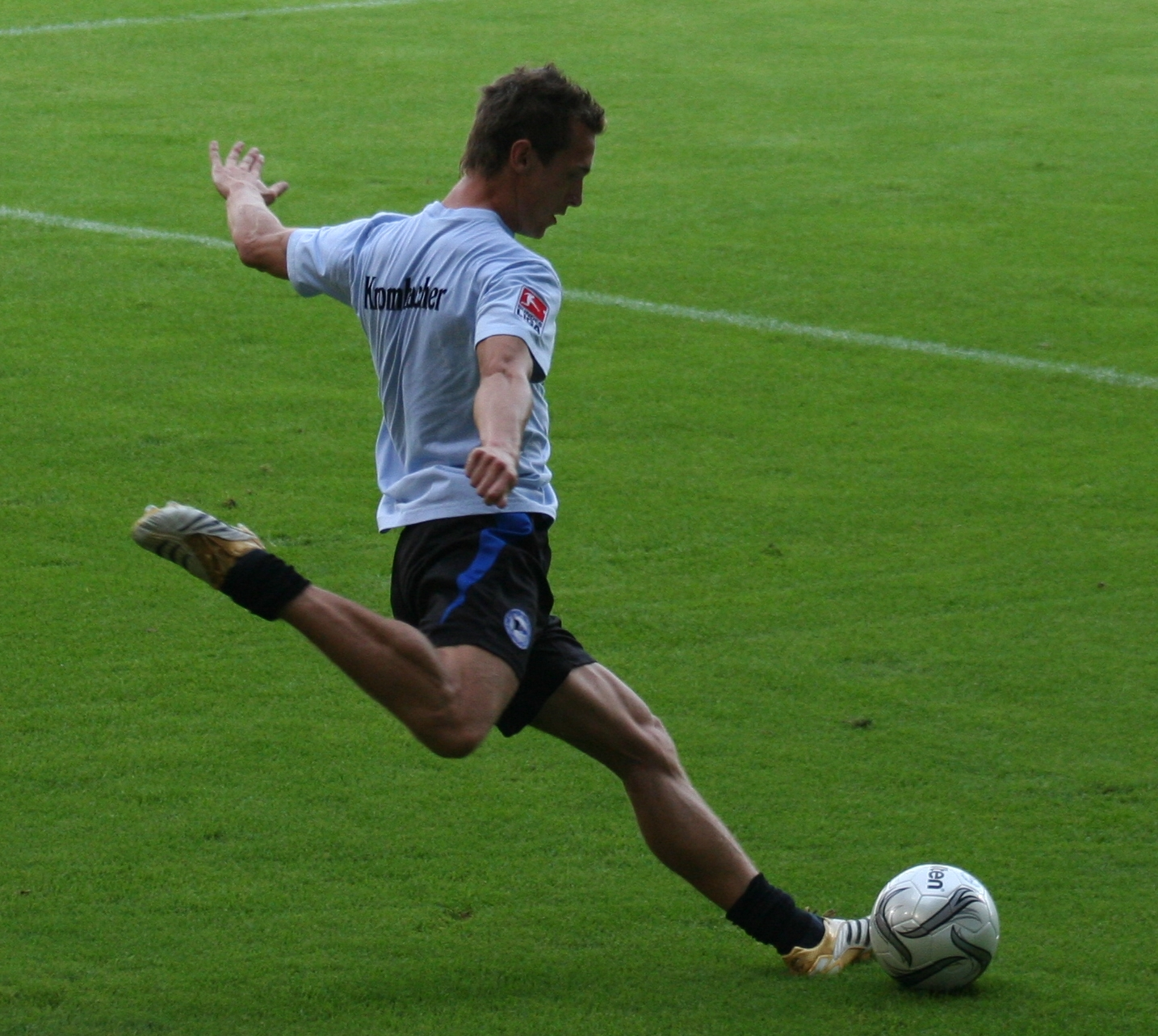

Personal information
- Full name: Jonas Kamper
- Date of birth: 3 May 1983 (age 43)
- Place of birth: Nørre Alslev, Denmark
- Height: 1.84 m (6 ft 0 in)
- Position: Winger

Youth career
- Eskildstrup BK
- NFA
- Brøndby

Senior career*
Years	Team	Apps	(Gls)
2002–2006	Brøndby	101	(13)
2006–2010	Arminia Bielefeld	86	(10)
2010–2015	Randers	122	(15)
2015–2018	Viborg	54	(8)

International career
1998–1999	Denmark U16	7	(2)
1999–2000	Denmark U17	18	(4)
2000–2002	Denmark U19	22	(6)
2002	Denmark U20	7	(0)
2002–2006	Denmark U21	39	(3)
2006	Denmark	1	(0)

Managerial career
- 2021–2024: Kolding (U19 manager)
- 2024–2026: Horsens (assistant)
- 2026: Kolding
- * Club domestic league appearances and goals

Jonas Kamper (born 3 May 1983) is a Danish retired footballer who played as a right winger.

He started his career with Brøndby IF, winning the 2005 Danish Superliga. He holds the record of Denmark national youth team matches, with a combined 93 matches and 15 goals at various youth levels. He played a single match for the Denmark national football team. He was a speedy player and was known for his skills to shoot at goal from distance. During his career he had offers from Ajax, Portsmouth, Schalke 04, Espanyol, Hannover and Sion that did not amount to anything.

== Club career ==
=== Brøndby IF ===
Born in Nørre Alslev, Kamper made his senior debut for Brøndby IF in the 2002–03 Danish Superliga season which ended with a runners-up silver medal. He was also a part of the Brøndby team which won the 2003 Danish Cup. The following two years, Kamper missed only three league matches, as he scored 11 goals in 63 league matches, and Kamper was a constant part of the Brøndby team during the 2004–05 Danish Superliga championship winning season. He completed the Double with the team, as Brøndby also won the 2005 Danish Cup. With the arrival of new signings Danish international player Thomas Rasmussen and Swedish international player Martin Ericsson, Kamper faced stiff competition for a place in the starting line-up in the 2005–06 Danish Superliga season. He played only 19 of 33 games that season.

=== Arminia Bielefeld ===
In the summer of 2006, Kamper moved abroad to play for Arminia Bielefeld in the German Bundesliga championship. In September 2006, Kamper scored his first Bielefeld goal on a free kick, to win the match against defending Bundesliga champions Bayern Munich 2–1. He scored six goals in 29 games during his first Bundesliga season. In March 2009, Kamper suffered an injury, and spent two months in recovery. He returned to the team for the last two games of the season, but could not prevent Bielefeld from being relegated to the German 2. Bundesliga. Under new Bielefeld coach Thomas Gerstner, Kamper found himself far from the starting line-up. He played only six games during the 2009–10 season, as Bielefeld finished in sixth place, and he was released from the club at the end of his contract.

=== Randers FC ===
On 3 July 2010, Kamper signed a three-year contract with Randers FC.

=== Viborg ===
On 11 June 2015, Kamper signed a one-year contract with Viborg FF. On 1 April 2016, he extended his contract to June 2018.

== International career ==
He represented the Denmark under-21 national team in the UEFA U-21 Championship 2006 tournament in May 2006, where he earned his record 39th cap for the under-21 national team. He was called up for the Denmark national football team in November 2006 following good displays for Bielefeld, and made his debut against the Czech Republic, although he played no games for the national team afterwards.

== Coaching and later career ==
After retiring in the summer 2018, Kamper began working as an insurer in an insurance company. A year later, in April 2019, he was hired as a sponsor salesman at his former club Randers FC, where he also helped the youth teams out in training sessions once in a while. He resigned from the position on 27 July 2021, because he wanted to start a coaching career.

Later on the same day, 27 July 2021, Kamper was announced as Kolding IF's new U-19 head coach.

On June 5, 2024, AC Horsens confirmed that the club had hired Kamper as assistant coach under newly appointed head coach Martin Retov, who Kamper played with for several years when the two played at Brøndby IF.

In March 2026, Kamper left Horsens to become new manager of Kolding IF.

== Honours ==
- Danish Superliga: 2004–05
- Danish Cup: 2002–03 and 2004–05
