= Horreby =

- Town
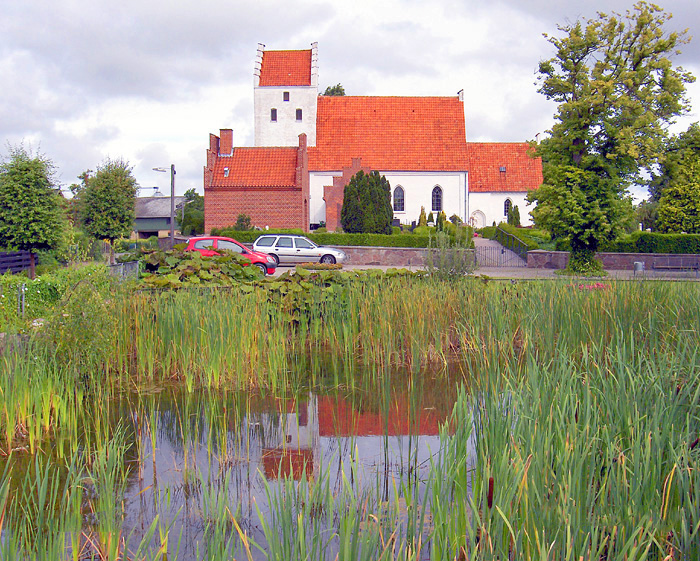
- Horreby Church, Falster

- Location on Falster
- Coordinates: 54°48′11″N 11°59′36″E
- Country: Denmark
- Region: Zealand (Sjælland)
- Municipality: Guldborgsund

Population (2026)
  - Total: 267
- Time zone: UTC+1 (CET)
  - Summer (DST): UTC+2 (CEST)

Horreby is a village located 10 kilometres (6.2 mi) east of Nykøbing on the Danish island of Falster. In January 2026 it had a population of 267.

== History ==
Horreby Church probably dates from the 13th century. Annexed to Falkerslev, it was set to be demolished in 1688 but the decision was retracted. It did however close in 1696 but was reopened the following year by order of the king.

Until the 1960s and 1970s, Horreby's main street, Nykøbingvej, had a wide variety of shops and services including a baker, butcher, carpenter, cobbler, dairy, electrician, grocer, hairdresser, plumber and vet. As a result of improved links with Nykøbing, all have now closed.

== The village today ==
Facilities in the village include Møllebakke School, two day care nurseries, a badminton club, and a youth sports club in nearby Listed. There is also a golf course and a riding school in the vicinity.

Horreby Lyng, a protected area of wetland to the northeast of the village is known for its mushrooms and butterflies, especially the large copper (Lycaena dispar).
