= Horbelev =

- Town
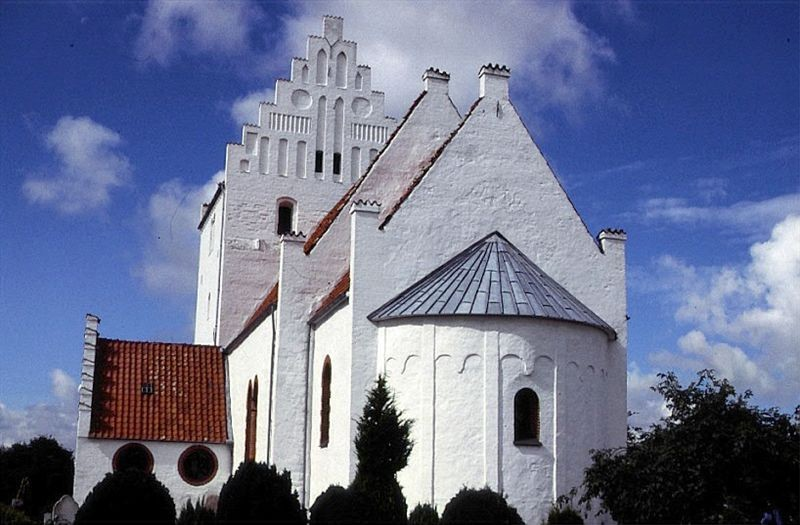
- Horbelev Church, Falster

- Location on Falster
- Coordinates: 54°49′22″N 12°03′21″E
- Country: Denmark
- Region: Zealand (Sjælland)
- Municipality: Guldborgsund

Population (2026)
  - Total: 524
- Time zone: UTC+1 (CET)
  - Summer (DST): UTC+2 (CEST)

Horbelev is a village some 16 kilometres (9.9 mi) northeast of Nykøbing on the Danish island of Falster. Horbelev Church, one of Falster's oldest, dates from the beginning of the 13th century. In January 2026 Horbelev had a population of 524.

== Etymology ==
In the 13th century the name was Horbærlef from the man's name Hornbori coupled with lev meaning inherited land or property.

== History ==
Horbelev Church, dating from c. 1200, is one of Falster's oldest. Horbelev once had a station on the Stubbekøbing–Nykøbing railway which operated from 1911 to 1966. It became an important agricultural service centre for the fertile surroundings. The stones around the tree at the corner of Lillegade and Stengårdsvej mark the location of the former moot, a place where administrative meetings were held.

== The village today ==
The village has a food store, a "village centre", a sports hall with cafeteria, a motel and a day nursery. Associations include an active sports club and an amateur drama group. The Landbyscenter or village centre in the premises of a former school serves as a venue for activities undertaken by the people of northeast Falster as well as for meetings of local clubs. It also houses a second hand store, a flower shop and a massage parlor. The recently inaugurated New Horbelev Festival is an annual event with theatrical presentations, a market day and an arts and crafts exhibition in the village centre.

== Notable people ==
- Jørgen Ravn (1884 in Horbelev – 1962) a Danish gymnast, silver medallist in the men's team, Swedish system event at the 1912 Summer Olympics
