= Nysted =

- Town
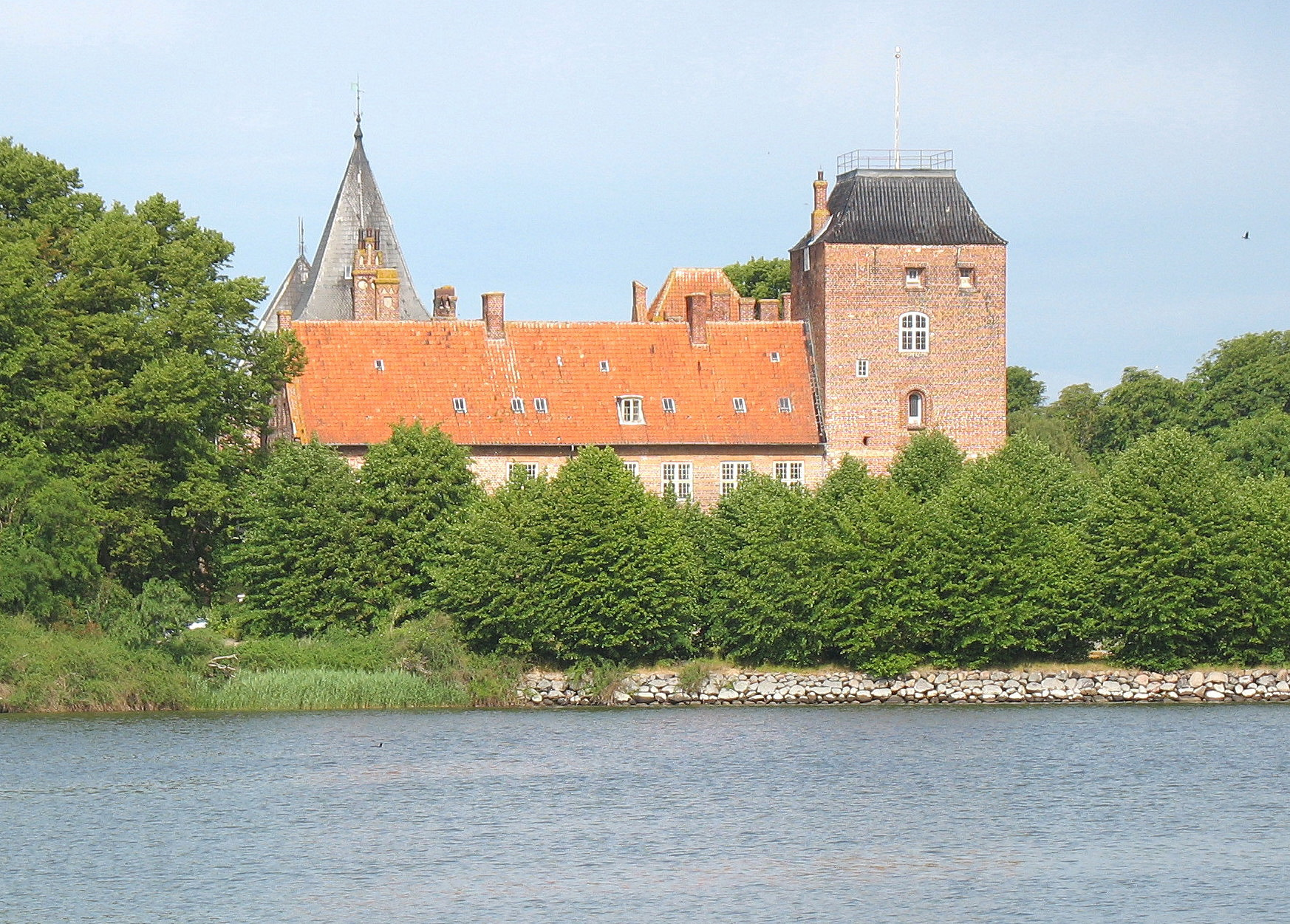
- Aalholm Castle

- Coat of arms

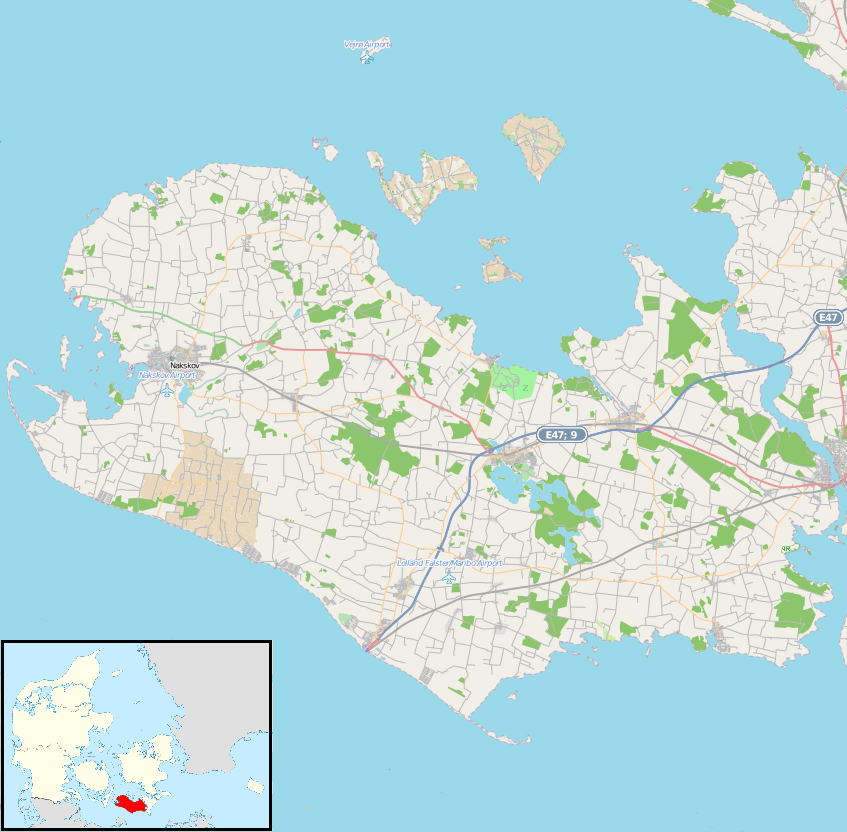
- Location on Lolland Nysted (Denmark Region Zealand) Nysted (Denmark)
- Coordinates: 54°40′N 11°44′E
- Country: Denmark
- Region: Region Zealand
- Municipality: Guldborgsund

Area
  - Urban: 1.34 km^{2} (0.52 sq mi)

Population (2026)
  - Urban: 1,237
  - Urban density: 923/km^{2} (2,390/sq mi)
- Time zone: UTC+1 (CET)
  - Summer (DST): UTC+2 (CEST)
- Postal code: DK-4880 Nysted

Nysted is a town in Guldborgsund Municipality in Region Zealand on the southeastern coast of the island of Lolland in south Denmark. Nysted is located on the southern coast of Lolland, and has a population of 1,237 (1 January 2026).

== History ==
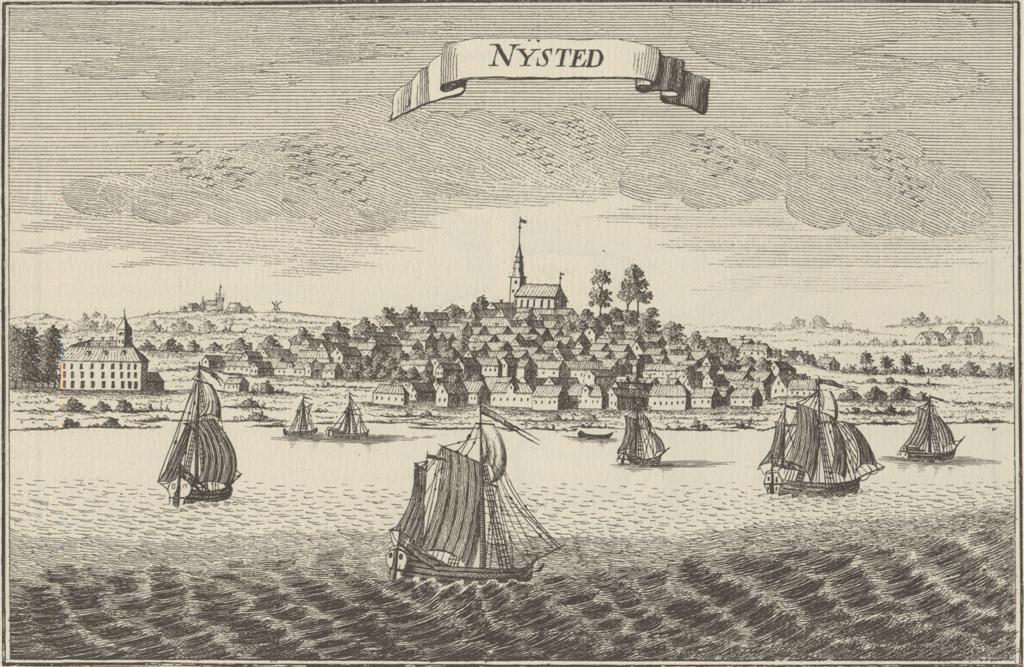
View of Nysted, 1767

The town and harbour originated during the Middle Ages near Aalholm Castle and a Franciscan cloister. The town was a natural crossroads for commerce and traffic on account of its having the only natural harbour on the south coast of Lolland.

During this time Lolland, and especially its southern coast, was vulnerable to attack by Wends, its neighbors on the opposite side of the Baltic Sea. Proximity to the castle was a great advantage to the people who lived there, but protection also meant that they belonged to the castle. On 7 December 1409 they were liberated when Eric of Pomerania gave Nysted merchant town status. This was re-established by King Christian II in 1513.

Like other merchant towns the citizens of Nysted joined in on Christian II's side in the Count's Feud, which resulted in the capture of Aalholm Castle in 1534 when Jørgen von der Wisch was absent. The castle then was overtaken by Count Christoffer, who held it for two years.

The town's coastal advantage as a natural harbour disappeared with the advent of the railroad.

== Attractions ==
The massive Aalholm Castle (Aalholm Slot ), built ca. 1200, dominates the view from the harbour at Nysted. For over 1,000 years this stronghold has tried to protected the town's citizens. It is one of the oldest, preserved Middle Ages fortresses in Denmark.

The castle has been enlarged several times, most recently in 1889. The castle was sold to the Raben-Levetzau family in 1725, who owned the property until 1995 when it was sold privately. It is owned today by the estate of the late Stig Husted Andersen. There is no entrance to the castle itself, but access is available to the park and forest via a path from the town. The Aalholm Automobile Museum (Automobilmuseet) is now closed, and all the cars are sold.

== Former municipality ==
Until 1 January 2007 Nysted was the seat of the former Nysted municipality (Danish, kommune) in the former Storstrøm County. The municipality covered an area of 142 km^{2}, and had a total population of 5,417 (2005). Its last mayor was Lennart Andersen, a member of the Social Democrats (Socialdemokraterne) political party. Nysted municipality ceased to exist as the result of Kommunalreformen ("The Municipality Reform" of 2007). It was merged with Nykøbing Falster, Nørre Alslev, Sakskøbing, Stubbekøbing, and Sydfalster municipalities to form the new Guldborgsund municipality. This created a municipality with an area of 907 km^{2} and a total population of 63,533 (2005).

== Notable people ==
- Emil Aarestrup (1800–1856), a Danish physician and poet. He lived in Nysted from 1827 until 1838.
