= Nørre Alslev =

- Town
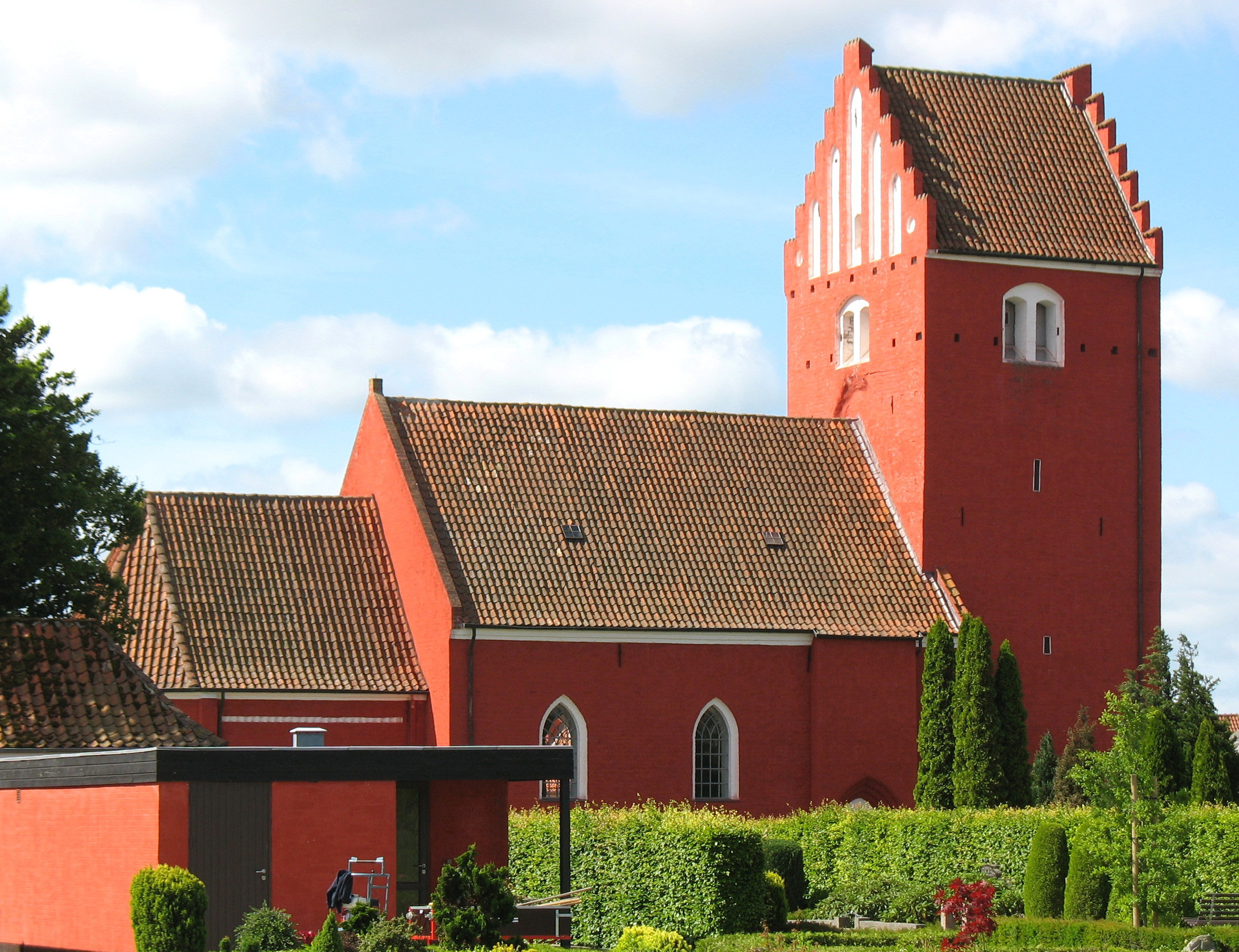
- Nørre Alslev Church, Falster

- Location on Falster Nørre Alslev (Denmark Region Zealand) Nørre Alslev (Denmark)
- Coordinates: 54°53′51″N 11°52′50″E
- Country: Denmark
- Region: Zealand (Sjælland)
- Municipality: Guldborgsund

Area
  - Urban: 2.3 km^{2} (0.89 sq mi)

Population (2026)
  - Urban: 2,324
  - Urban density: 1,000/km^{2} (2,600/sq mi)
- Time zone: UTC+1 (CET)
  - Summer (DST): UTC+2 (CEST)

Nørre Alslev (Danish pronunciation: [ˈnɶɐ̯ɐ ˈælˀˌsle̝w]) is a town with a population of 2,324 (1 January 2026) on the northern end of the island of Falster in south Denmark. It belongs to Guldborgsund municipality in Region Sjælland.

Until 1 January 2007 Nørre Alslev was the seat of the former Nørre Alslev municipality (Danish, kommune) in the former Storstrøm County. The municipality covered an area of 181 km^{2}, and had a total population of 9,595 (2005). Its last mayor was Niels Larsen, a member of the Venstre (Liberal Party) political party. Nørre Alslev municipality ceased to exist as the result of Kommunalreformen ("The Municipality Reform" of 2007). It was merged with Nykøbing Falster, Nysted, Sakskøbing, Stubbekøbing, and Sydfalster municipalities to form the new Guldborgsund municipality.

Two bridges connect the former municipality and the rest of Falster to Zealand. The 3,199 metre long Storstrøm Bridge connects the former municipality from near the town of Orehoved to Masnedø, an island in Storstrømmen, and the 201 metre long Masnedsund Bridge (Masnedsundbroen) continues from there to the town of Vordingborg. The Storstrøm Bridge supports two lanes of traffic, plus a single track of the South Line Railway. Both of these bridges were inaugurated in 1937.

Further to the east are the two Farø Bridges (the 1,726 metre long Farø High Bridge and the 1,596 metre long Farø Low Bridge) which opened in 1985.

Nørre Alslev has a railway station along the South Line Railway.

== Notable people ==
- Jonas Kamper (born 1983 in Nørre Alslev), a Danish footballer with over 350 club caps

Preceding station	DSB	Following station
Vordingborg towards Næstved	Næstved–Nykøbing F Regional train	Eskilstrup towards Nykøbing F
