= Stubbekøbing =

- Town
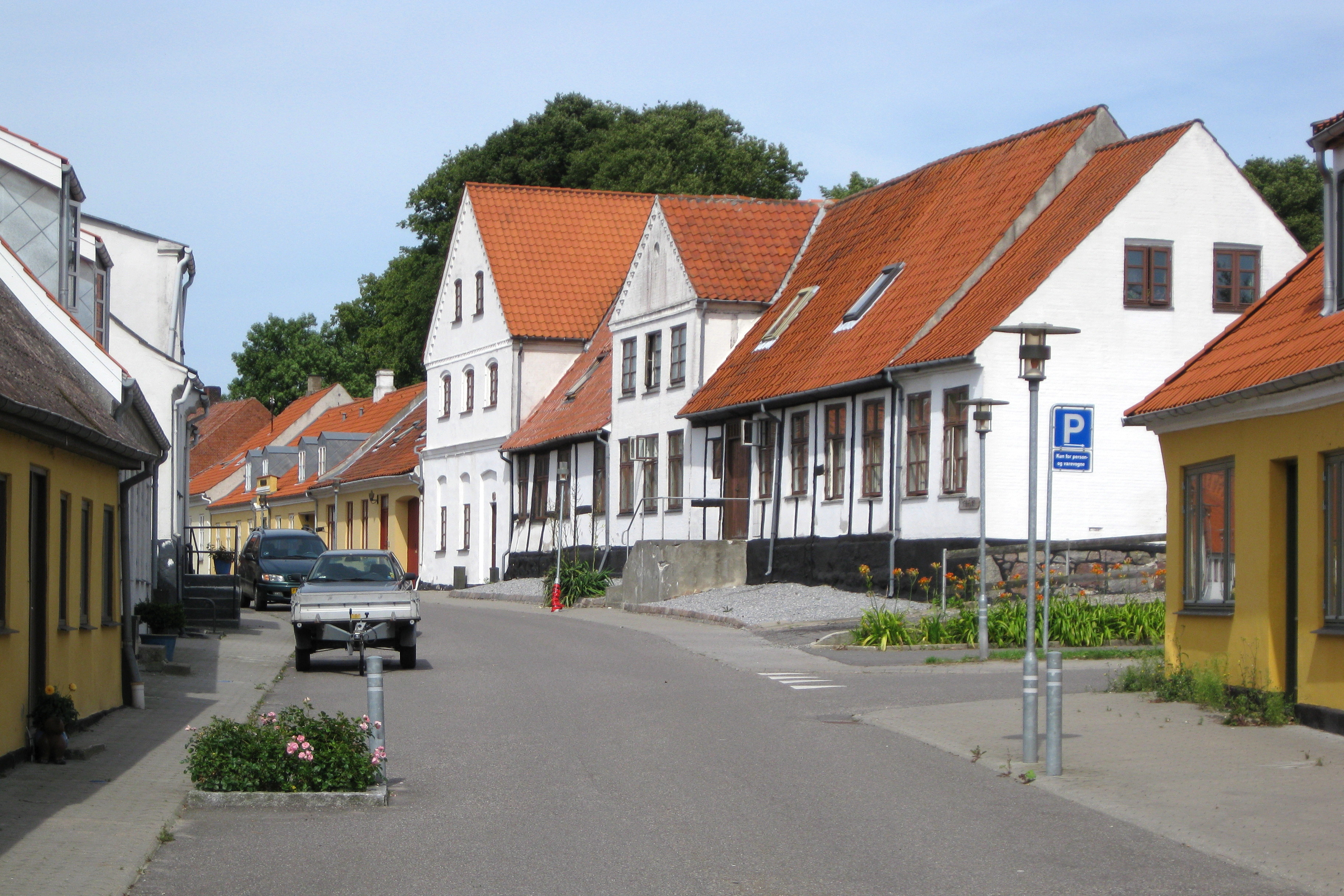
- Stubbekøbing, Falster

- Coat of arms

- Location within Falster Location within Denmark Region Zealand Location within Denmark
- Coordinates: 54°53′18″N 12°02′10″E
- Country: Denmark
- Region: Zealand (Sjælland)
- Municipality: Guldborgsund

Area
  - Urban: 1.8 km^{2} (0.69 sq mi)

Population (2026)
  - Urban: 2,204
  - Urban density: 1,200/km^{2} (3,200/sq mi)
- Time zone: UTC+1 (CET)
  - Summer (DST): UTC+2 (CEST)

Stubbekøbing (Danish pronunciation: [ˈstupəˌkʰøˀpe̝ŋ]) is a town with a population of 2,204 (1 January 2026) in Guldborgsund municipality in Region Sjælland on the northeastern coast of the island of Falster in south Denmark. Ferry service connects the town of Stubbekøbing over the Grønsund to Bogø at the town of Nyby.

To the northeast is the island of Møn, which is separated from Stubbekøbing by the waters of Grønsund, the strait which separates Møn and the island of Bogø from Falster. To the east and southeast is the Baltic Sea.

Stubbekøbing Church, built in the Romanesque style in the 13th century, has a Renaissance altarpiece and an elaborately carved pulpit as well as a variety of old frescos and wall decorations (1300–1500).

Until 1 January 2007 Stubbekøbing was also a municipality covering an area of 156 km², and with a total population of 6,786 (2005). Stubbekøbing municipality ceased to exist as the result of Kommunalreformen ("The Municipality Reform" of 2007). It was merged with Nykøbing Falster, Nysted, Nørre Alslev, Sakskøbing, and Sydfalster municipalities to form the new Guldborgsund municipality. This created a municipality with an area of 907 km² and a total population of 63,533 (2005).

== Famous residents of Stubbekøbing ==
People who are born, or have lived in Stubbekøbing include:

- Lucas Debes (1623–1675), priest, topographer and writer
- Marie Grubbe (1643–1718), noble woman
- Hans Egede (1686-1758), Lutheran missionary, the Apostle of Greenland
- Clara Wæver (1855–1930), embroiderer
- Evald Nielsen (1879-1958), silversmith
- Frederik Magle (born 1977), composer, concert organist and pianist

== Geography ==
=== Climate ===
Climate data for Stubbekobing
Month	Jan	Feb	Mar	Apr	May	Jun	Jul	Aug	Sep	Oct	Nov	Dec	Year
Mean daily maximum °C (°F)	2 (35)	2 (36)	4 (40)	9 (49)	15 (59)	18 (65)	21 (69)	20 (68)	16 (61)	11 (52)	6 (43)	3 (38)	11 (51)
Mean daily minimum °C (°F)	−2 (28)	−2 (28)	−1 (31)	3 (37)	7 (44)	11 (52)	13 (56)	13 (55)	10 (50)	6 (43)	2 (36)	−1 (31)	5 (41)
Average precipitation mm (inches)	41 (1.6)	33 (1.3)	38 (1.5)	36 (1.4)	41 (1.6)	48 (1.9)	71 (2.8)	66 (2.6)	48 (1.9)	56 (2.2)	46 (1.8)	51 (2)	570 (22.5)
Source: Weatherbase
