= Marielyst =

- Town
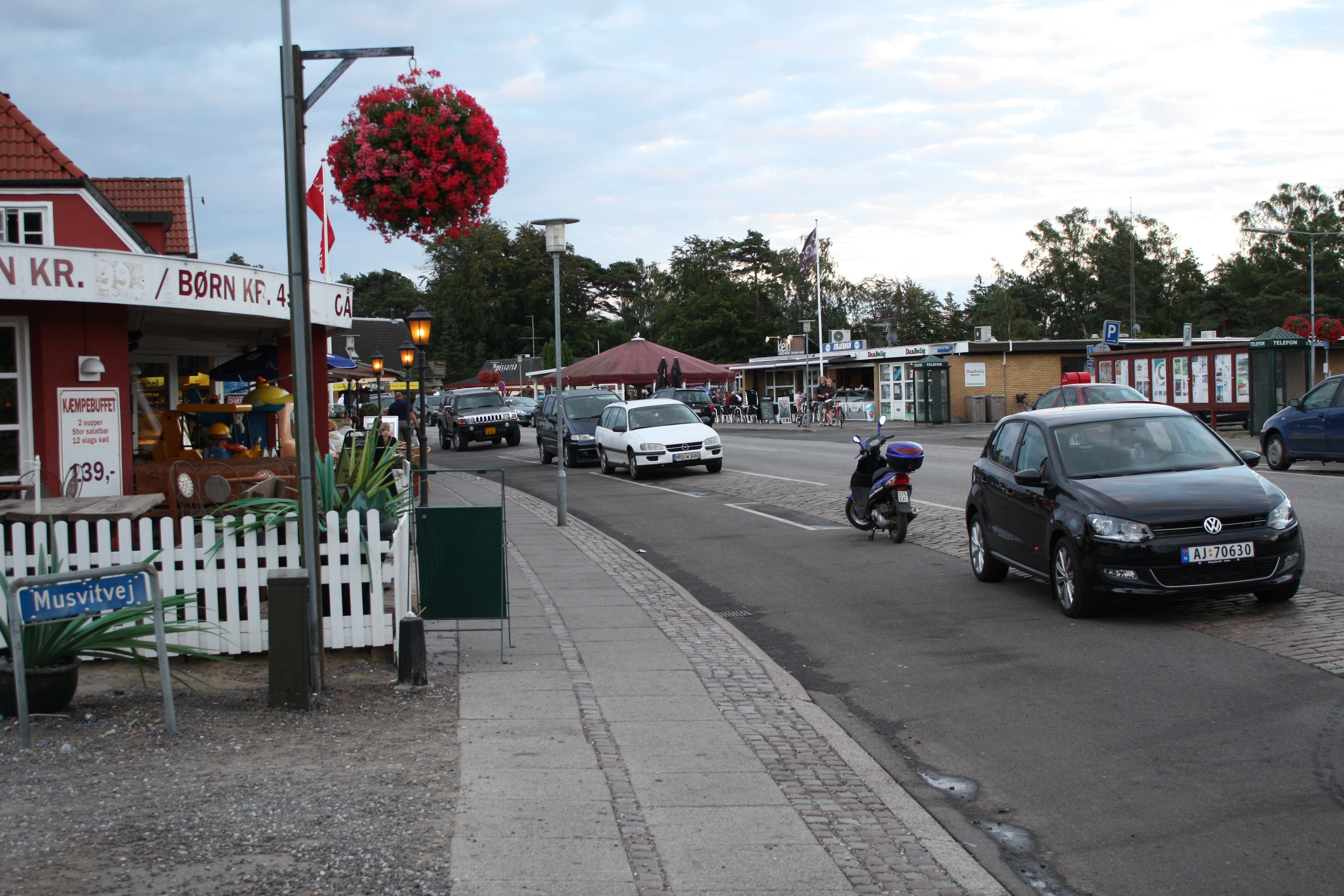
- Marielyst, Falster

- Location on Falster
- Coordinates: 54°41′52″N 11°57′24″E
- Country: Denmark
- Region: Zealand (Sjælland)
- Municipality: Guldborgsund

Population (2026)
  - Total: 621
- Time zone: UTC+1 (CET)
  - Summer (DST): UTC+2 (CEST)

Marielyst is a small town and seaside resort some 12 kilometres (7.5 mi) south of Nykøbing on the Danish island of Falster. Its long sandy beach has led to an extensive summer house development with some 6,000 holiday homes. As of 2026, it has a population of 621.

== Geography ==
Marielyst is situated on the Baltic coast of Falster. At the end of the last ice age some 12,000 years ago, the melting ice left an 18-kilometre (11 mi) long mound of clay, sand, and rocks extending from Idestrup to Gedser. Initially there were three islands, Langø, Bøtø, and Bøtø Fang, but these were later silted up. However, an inlet remained at Gedesby leading into the Bøtø Nor lake stretching 16 km from Sildestrup to Gedesby. Between 1860 and 1865, the inlet was closed, a dike was built, and the inland area was drained.

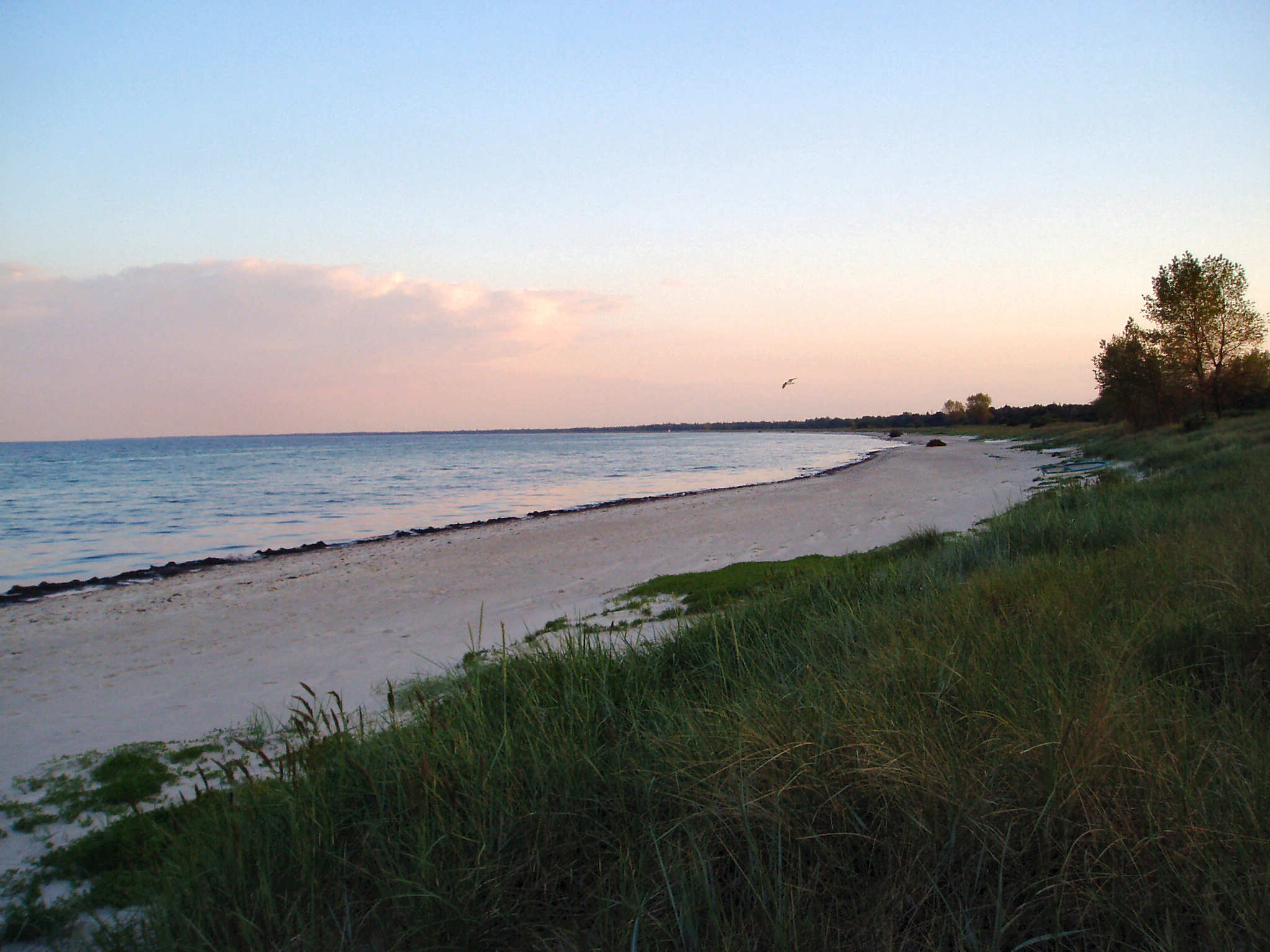
The long beach.

Marielyst's white sand beach is the most western of those along the littoral zone of five countries. In a survey of ten Danish beaches carried out in 2011, Marielyst's beach, stretching no less than 20 kilometres (12 mi), came in first with 19.2% of the votes. The soft white sandy beach was judged to be particularly suitable for children. Other localities along the beach are Eikenøre, Sildestrup, Stovby, Klit, and Bøtø with Marielyst at the centre. Behind the sand dunes along the beach, there is a dyke which was built at the end of the 19th century to protect the inland area from flooding, enabling it to be used for farming. A footpath (too narrow for bicycles) offers pleasant walks over the full 20 km stretch next to the sea.

== History ==
After the sea floods caused by a storm in 1872, Hans Jørgensen succeeded in draining the land in the area for farming. He named his new farmhouse Marielyst after his wife Marie. In 1906, the lawyer Frederik Graae (1865–1938) converted the farmhouse into a hotel with 12 rooms called Marielyst Østersøbad. He opened it on 28 July 1906, inviting local and national celebrities as well as representatives of the international press. Thanks to its great success, additional accommodation was made available in another farmhouse, Nørrevang. In 1908–1909, Graae built three sophisticated Art Nouveau homes called Troldtøj, Kitwalde and Tannhäuser after works by Holger Drachmann. Decorated with paintings by Olaf Rude and Carl Holm, they were purchased by wealthy families from Copenhagen. Local residents followed in the 1920s, building mostly two-storey brick houses with a sea view from the first floor. Smaller, wooden houses followed as land prices rose.

In 1919, Laurits Hansen opened the first grocery on Marielyst Torv, soon adding a restaurant. The Tannhäuser residence became a guest house in 1932, with a restaurant in 1939. After the Storstrøm Bridge to Zealand was opened in 1937, Strandhotellet was built in 1938, renamed later as Østersøens Perle. Another hotel, Ivanna, later Marielyst Strandhotel, came in 1956 but was torn down in 2006 to make way for holiday apartments. Around 1940, Marielyst became a popular summer house development with some 500 small holiday homes located between Bøtøvej and Storkevej. In the 1960s and 1970s, there was renewed interest in summer houses in the surrounding area. Today there are over 6,000 summer houses in and around Marielyst.

== Notable people ==
- Sarah Grünewald (born 1984) a Danish model, TV presenter and actress; she was raised in Marielyst

== Landmarks ==
Marielyst, built in the style of a Mediterranean resort, has a wide selection of hotels, restaurants, shops, holiday apartments and discothèques. Strandkirken (Beach Church), an independent institution forming part of the Danish National Church, was opened in 1957. There are Sunday services in Danish and German during the summer months. Golf & Fun Park offers different forms of minigolf and various facilities for children. Other amusements include a go kart centre and a kite and windsurfing school. The folk high school, Højskolen i Marielyst, offers a variety of courses and music events in its fine concert hall which looks out over the sea.

== Gallery ==
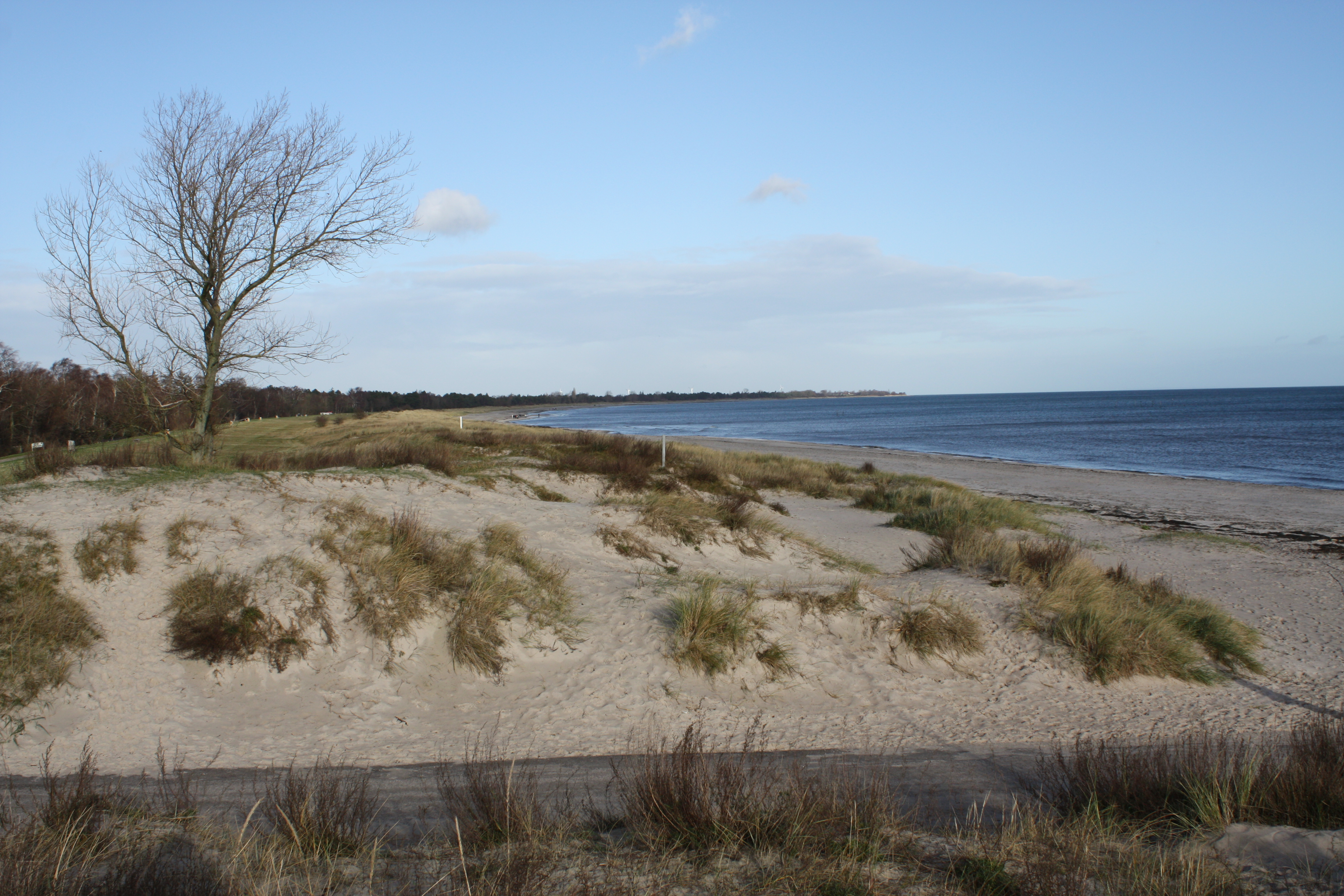
Sand dunes

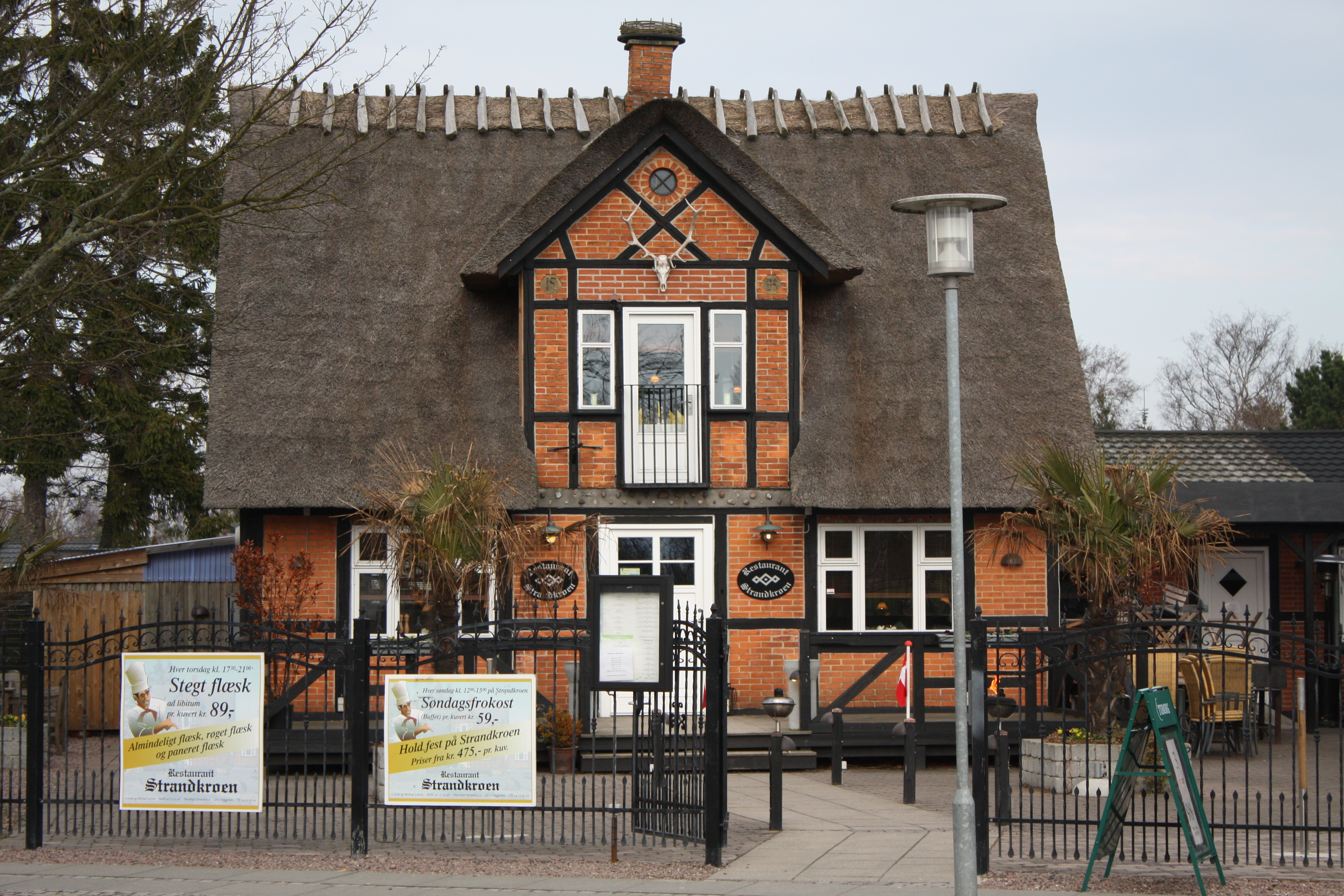
Strandkroen

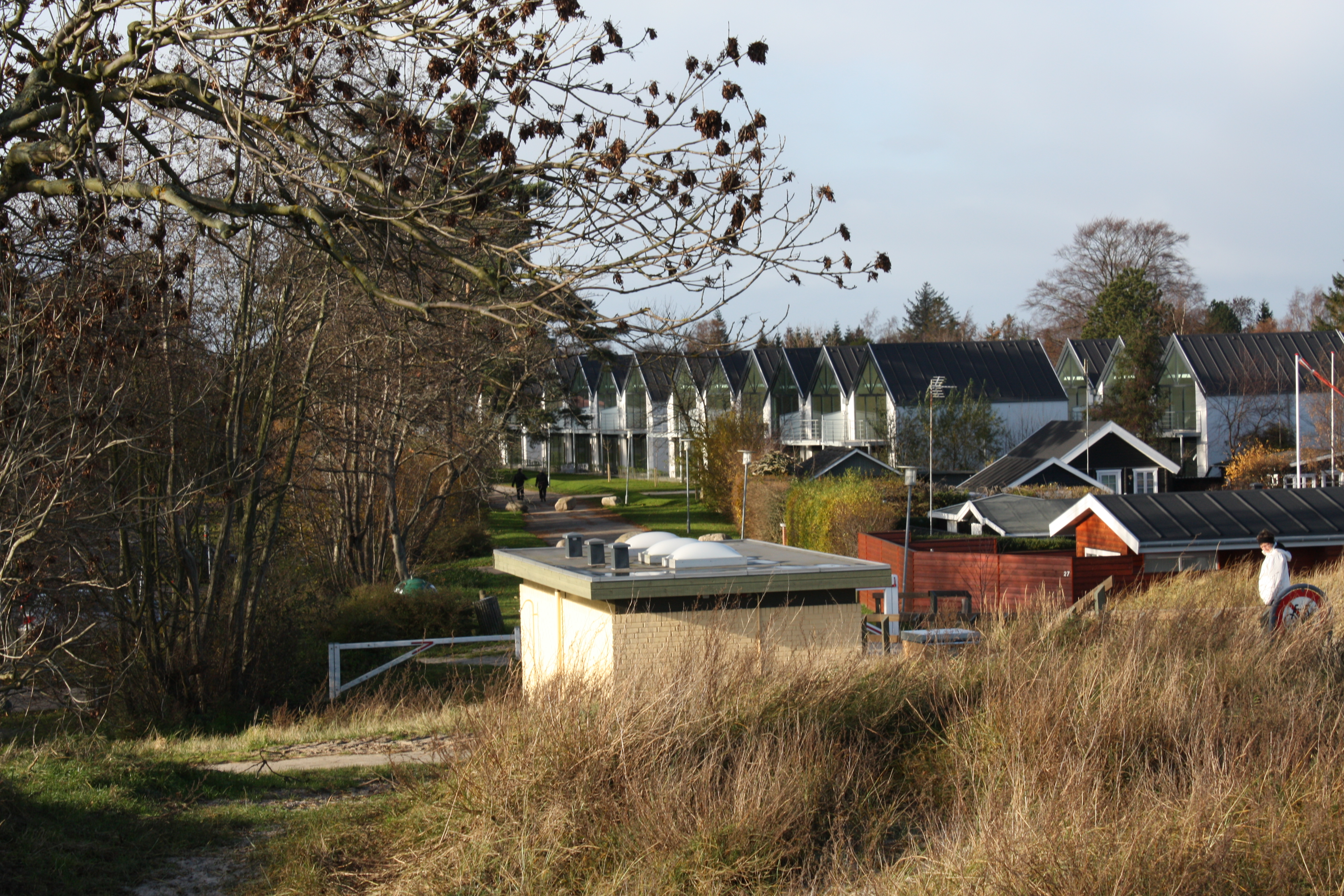
Holiday apartments

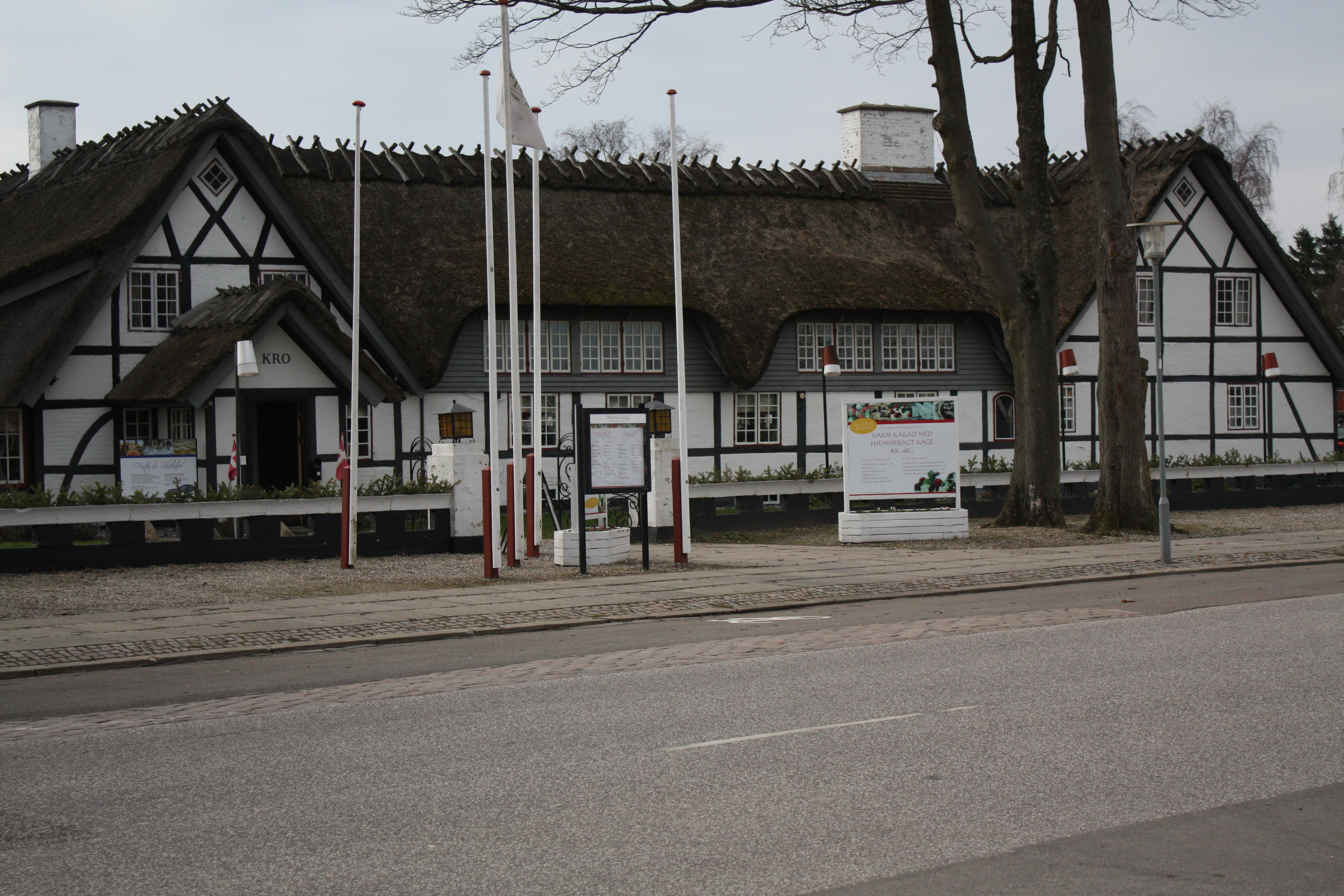
Hotel Nørrevang

== Bibliography ==
- Johansen, Astrid (2006). Marielyst 100 år: 1906 - 2006. Højskolen Marielyst. ISBN 978-87-7368-071-1.
