= Systofte Skovby =

- Town
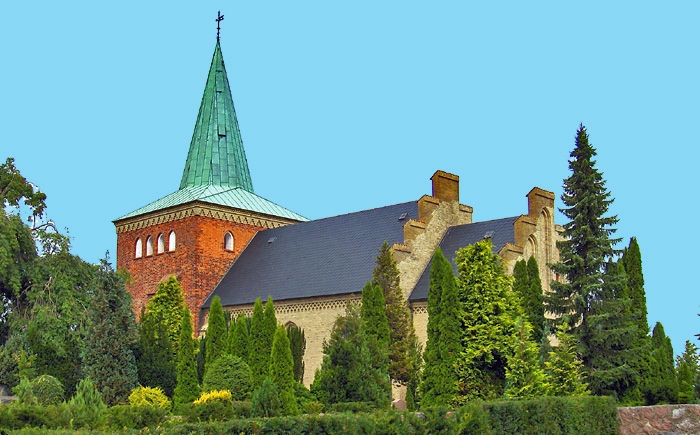
- Systofte Church, Falster

- Location on Falster
- Coordinates: 54°47′03″N 11°54′20″E
- Country: Denmark
- Region: Zealand (Sjælland)
- Municipality: Guldborgsund

Population (2026)
  - Total: 353
- Time zone: UTC+1 (CET)
  - Summer (DST): UTC+2 (CEST)

Systofte Skovby is a village 3 kilometres (1.9 mi) east of Nykøbing on the Danish island of Falster. Today it serves as a satellite village for Nykøbing. As of 2026, it has a population of 353.

== History ==
Portions of the old nave and chancel of Systofte Church indicate that it was originally built in the Late Romanesque period. Under Bishop Jens Andersen Beldenak in the early 16th century, the Crown enjoyed jus vocandi rights for the appointment of clergy. In 1832 it came under the administration of Orupgaard but obtained independent ownership in 1940.
