= Idestrup =

- Town
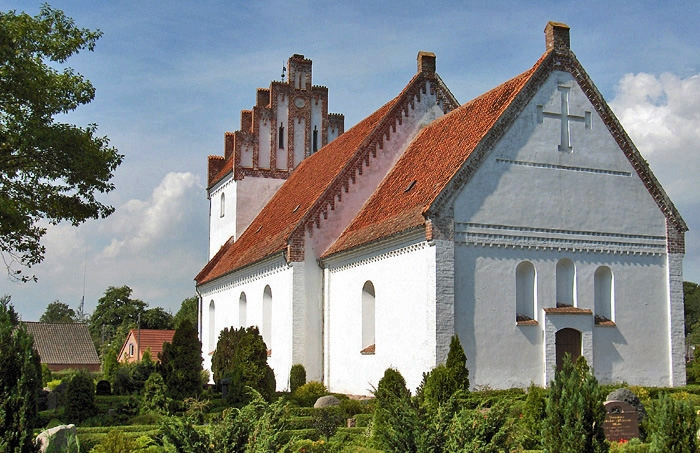
- Idestrup Church, Falster

- Location on Falster Idestrup (Denmark Region Zealand) Idestrup (Denmark)
- Coordinates: 54°44′32″N 11°57′28″E
- Country: Denmark
- Region: Zealand (Sjælland)
- Municipality: Guldborgsund

Area
  - Urban: 0.9 km^{2} (0.35 sq mi)

Population (2026)
  - Urban: 1,106
  - Urban density: 1,200/km^{2} (3,200/sq mi)
- Time zone: UTC+1 (CET)
  - Summer (DST): UTC+2 (CEST)

Idestrup is a town some 7 kilometres (4.3 mi) southeast of Nykøbing Falster on the Danish island of Falster. As of 2026, it has a population of 1,106.

== History ==
Idestrup Church built in the Romanesque style dates from the 12th century. With its whitewashed walls, rounded windows and a red tiled roof it stands in the middle of the town. Other buildings of interest include the dairy from the late 19th century, the foramlingshus (community centre) from 1901 and the old people's home with a history going back to 1924.

The town's development owes much to Edward Tesdorph, originally a farmer, who built a pump station to drain the area after a flood in 1872. He was behind the local high tension power station (1912) as well as the sugar refinery in Nykøbing.

Various Iron Age and Bronze Age finds have recently been made in and around Idestrup indicating that it has been inhabited for much longer than previously thought.

== The town today ==
The town has a sports association, Idestrup-Væggerløse Idrætsforening, and Idestrup Hallen, a sports hall suitable for football, handball, gymnastics, badminton and tennis. There is also a library, food store and, since 2011, a new private school.

== Notable people ==
- Edward Tesdorpf (1817 – 1889 in Orupgaard) a German-Danish landowner, agricultural pioneer and sugar manufacturer; buried in Idstrup cemetery
- Czeslaw Kozon (born 1951 in Idestrup, Falster) the Bishop of the Roman Catholic Diocese of Copenhagen
- Mads Rasmussen (born 1981 in Idestrup on Falster) a Danish rower and double World Champion and Olympic Gold medal winner in the lightweight double sculls
