= Danish Straits =

Three channels in Denmark connecting the Baltic Sea to the North Sea

Coordinates: 56°N 11°E

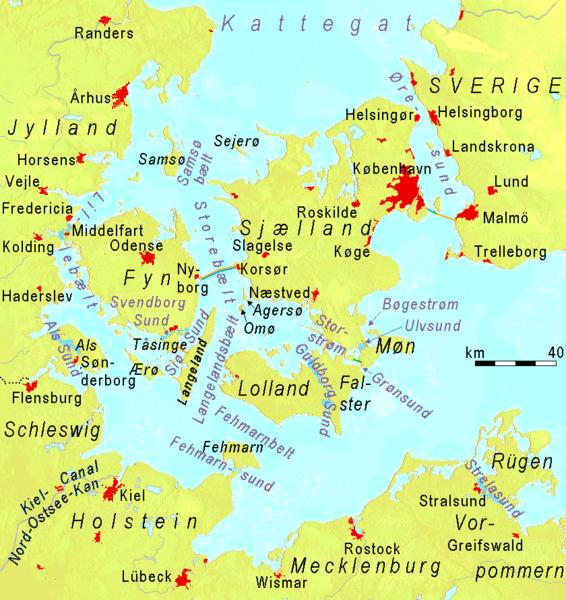
Belts and sounds in Denmark and southwestern Baltic Sea

The Danish Straits connect the Baltic Sea to the North Sea through the Kattegat and Skagerrak. Historically, the Danish Straits were internal waterways of Denmark; however, following territorial losses, Øresund and Fehmarn Belt are now shared with Sweden and Germany, while the Great Belt and the Little Belt have remained Danish territorial waters. The Copenhagen Convention of 1857 made all the Danish Straits open to commercial shipping. The straits have generally been regarded as an international waterway.

== Toponymy and geography ==
Five straits are named 'belt' (Danish: bælt), the only ones in the world. Several other straits are named 'sound' (Danish, Swedish and German: sund). Where an island is situated between a "belt" and a "sound", typically the broader strait is called "belt" and the narrower one is the "sound":

- Als:
  - separated from the continent by Alssund
  - separated from Fyn by the southern part of the Little Belt, an area referred to in German (but not Danish) as Alsenbelt
- Fehmarn
  - separated from the continent by Fehmarnsund, also Femersund
  - separated from Lolland by Fehmarnbelt (German) / Femerbelt (Low German) / Femernbælt (Danish; former spelling: Femer Bælt)
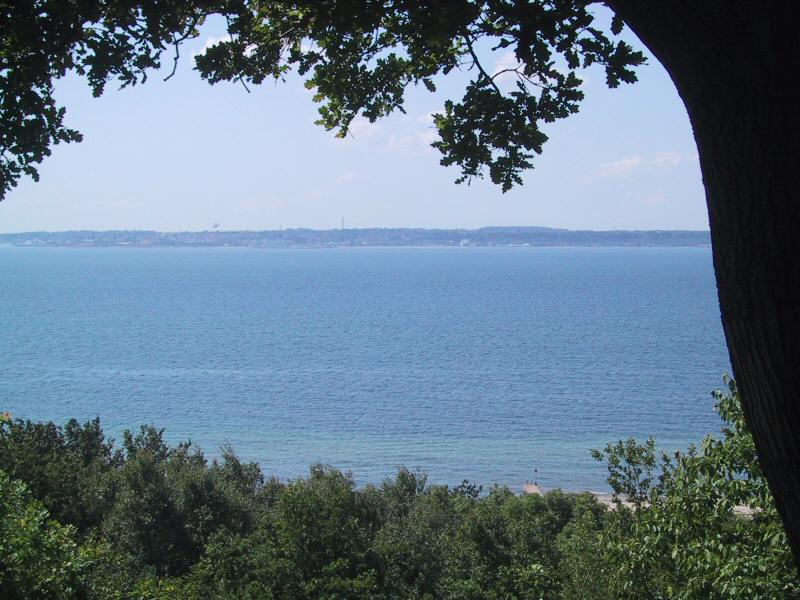
    The Øresund, seen from Helsingborg
- Langeland:
  - separated from Tåsinge Island by Siø Sund (Tåsinge is separated from Fyn by Svendborg Sund)
  - separated from Lolland by Langelandsbælt, the southern part of the Great Belt
- Lolland:
  - separated from Falster by Guldborgsund (Falster is separated from Zealand by Storstrømmen Strait and by Møn by Grønsund)
  - separated from Langeland by Langelandsbælt
  - separated from Fehmarn by Femernbælt, which is the common continuation of Great Belt–Langelandsbælt and Little Belt
  - separated from Zealand by Smålandsfarvandet
- Zealand (Danish: Sjælland)
  - separated from the Scandinavian peninsula by Øresund (Danish) / Öresund (Swedish)
  - separated from Fyn by the Great Belt
  - separated from Lolland, Falster and Møn (as well as from smaller islands Bogø and Farø) by Smålandsfarvandet, Storstrømmen Ulvsund and Bøgestrøm.

== Crossing the straits ==
During the 20th and 21st centuries the surrounding areas grew in population and cross-border trade developed, particularly as part of the European single market. The European Union Scandinavian–Mediterranean Corridor runs north-south through the Danish straits.

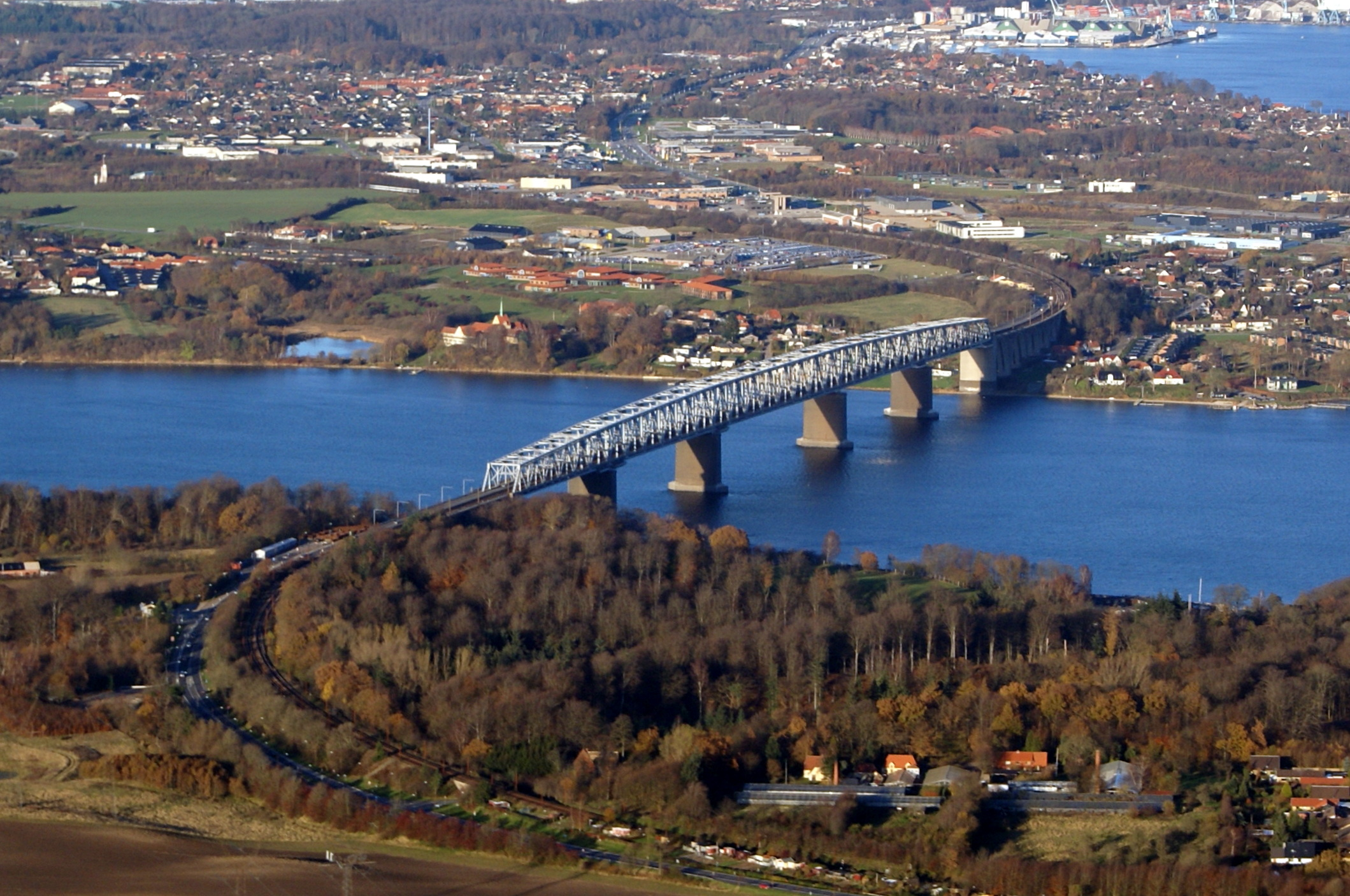
One of the first fixed links - the Little Belt Bridge opened in 1935

Ferries crossed many of the straits but some of these have been replaced with fixed links to reduce journey times. Most significantly, since 1999 the cities of Hamburg and Copenhagen have been linked without the use of ferries. The fixed links include:

- 1930 – King Christian X's Bridge in Sønderborg
- 1935 – "Old" Little Belt Bridge
- 1937 – Storstrøm Bridge
- 1960 – Siøsund Bridge
- 1970 – "New" Little Belt Bridge (1970)
- 1981 – Alssund Bridge
- 1998 – Great Belt Bridge
- 1999 – Øresund Bridge
- 2032 – expected completion of Fehmarn Belt fixed link

== See also ==
- Kiel Canal
- Göta Canal
- Eider Canal
- List of islands of Denmark
- March across the Belts
