= List of bridges in Denmark =

This is a list of bridges and viaducts in Denmark, including those for pedestrians and vehicular traffic.

== Major road and railway bridges ==
	Name	Span	Length	Type	Carries Crosses	Opened	Location	Region	Ref.
1	Great Belt Bridge	1,624 m (5,328 ft)	6,790 m (22,280 ft)	Suspension; Steel box girder deck, concrete pylons 535+1624+535	Fynske Motorvej; Vestmotorvejen European route E20; Great Belt	1998	Korsør–Sprogø; 55°20′31″N 11°2′9.3″E	Zealand	
2	Little Belt Bridge (1970)	600 m (2,000 ft)	1,700 m (5,600 ft)	Suspension; Steel box girder deck, concrete pylons 240+600+240	Østjyske Motorvej; Fynske Motorvej European route E20; Little Belt	1970	Middelfart–Fredericia; 55°31′7.1″N 9°44′56.9″E	Southern Denmark	
3	Øresund Bridge	490 m (1,610 ft)	7,845 m (25,738 ft)	Cable-stayed; Steel truss deck, concrete pylons 2 levels deck 141+160+490+160+141	Øresundsmotorvejen European route E20; Øresund Line; Øresund	2000	Copenhagen–Malmö; 55°34′30.6″N 12°49′37″E	Capital Region of Denmark; Sweden	
4	Farø Bridge	290 m (950 ft)	1,726 m (5,663 ft)	Cable-stayed; Steel box girder deck, concrete pylons 120+290+120	Sydmotorvejen European route E47; European route E55; Storstrømmen	1984	Falster–Vordingborg; 54°56′37.6″N 11°58′30″E	Zealand	
5	Little Belt Bridge	220 m (720 ft)	1,175 m (3,855 ft)	Cantilever; Steel; 137+165+220+165+137	Road bridge 161 Kolding Landevej; Little Belt	1935	Middelfart–Fredericia; 55°31′2.4″N 9°42′34.3″E	Southern Denmark	
6	Queen Margrethe II's Bridge under construction	160 m (520 ft)(x2)	3,840 m (12,600 ft)	Cable-stayed; Concrete box girder deck, 1 concrete pylon 160+160	Road bridge Copenhagen–Hamburg railway line Storstrømmen	2025	Falster–Vordingborg; 54°58′26.7″N 11°52′04.1″E	Zealand	
7	Alssund Bridge	150 m (490 ft)	660 m (2,170 ft)	Box girder Prestressed concrete 85+150+85	Road bridge 8 Omfartsvejen; Alssund	1981	Sønderborg; 54°55′19.8″N 9°45′58.8″E	Southern Denmark	
8	Storstrøm Bridge	136 m (446 ft)	3,199 m (10,495 ft)	Arch; Steel tied arch Bow-string bridge 104+138+104	Road bridge 153 Brovejen; Copenhagen–Hamburg railway line Storstrømmen	1937	Falster–Vordingborg; 54°58′00.0″N 11°53′05.3″E	Zealand	
9	Queen Alexandrine Bridge	127 m (417 ft)	745 m (2,444 ft)	Arch; Steel through arch	Road bridge Præstøvej 59; Ulvsund	1943	Kalvehave–Møn; 54°59′22.1″N 12°9′52.5″E	Zealand	
10	Odin's Bridge	118 m (387 ft)	815 m (2,674 ft)	Beam bridge Steel box girder deck Swing bridge	Odense Ring 2 Odense Kanal	2014	Odense; 55°25′20.3″N 10°22′49.3″E	Southern Denmark	
11	Vejle Fjord Bridge	110 m (360 ft)(x15)	1,712 m (5,617 ft)	Box girder Prestressed concrete	European route E45; Vejle Fjord	1980	Vejle; 55°42′5.7″N 9°34′25.4″E	Southern Denmark	
12	Great Belt West Bridge	110 m (360 ft)(x51)	6,611 m (21,690 ft)	Box girder Prestressed concrete	Fynske Motorvej; Vestmotorvejen European route E20; Great Belt	1994	Nyborg–Sprogø; 55°18′38″N 10°54′7.4″E	Southern Denmark	
13	Sallingsund Bridge	93 m (305 ft)(x17)	1,718 m (5,636 ft)	Box girder Prestressed concrete	Road bridge Brovej 26; Salling Sund	1978	Salling–Mors; 56°44′57.1″N 8°50′52.7″E	North Jutland	
14	Svendborgsund Bridge	90 m (300 ft)	1,220 m (4,000 ft)	Box girder Prestressed concrete	Road bridge Sundbrovej; Svendborgsund	1966	Svendborg–Tåsinge; 55°2′48.2″N 10°36′13.3″E	Southern Denmark	
15	Farø North Bridge	40 m (130 ft)	1,596 m (5,236 ft)	Beam bridge Steel	Sydmotorvejen European route E47; European route E55; Storstrømmen	1984	Falster–Vordingborg; 54°57′47.6″N 11°59′54.6″E	Zealand	
16	Langeland Bridge	91 m (299 ft)	774 m (2,539 ft)			1962	Langeland–Siø		
17	Aggersund Bridge	90 m (300 ft)	210 m (690 ft)			1942	Limfjord		
18	Egernsund Bridge	37 m (121 ft)	238 m (781 ft)			1968	Egernsund		
19	Vilsund Bridge	30 m (98 ft)	382 m (1,253 ft)			1939	Vilsund (Jylland)		
20	Frederick IX Bridge	25 m (82 ft)	295 m (968 ft)			1963	Guldborgsund (Lolland–Falster)		
21	Masnedsund Bridge	25 m (82 ft)	201 m (659 ft)			1937	Masnedsund (Falster–Sjælland)		
22	Limfjordsbroen		640 m (2,100 ft)			1933	Limfjord (peninsular Jutland–North Jutlandic Island)		
23	Siøsund Bridge		558 m (1,831 ft)			1959	Siøsund; Tåsinge–Siø)		
24	Oddesund Bridge		472 m (1,549 ft)			1938	Limfjord		
25	Langebro		250 m (820 ft)			1954	Port of Copenhagen		
26	Guldborgsund Bridge		180 m (590 ft)			1934	Guldborgsund (Lolland–Falster)		
27	Munkholm Bridge		114 m (374 ft)			1952	Isefjord (Sjælland)		

== Alphabetical list ==
- Aggersund Bridge
- Alssund Bridge
- Farø Bridges
- Fehmarn Belt Fixed Link: A bridge was proposed as one means of spanning the Fehmarn Belt (to Germany)
- Frederick IX Bridge
- Great Belt Fixed Link
- Guldborgsund Bridge
- Knippelsbro
- Langebro
- Langeland Bridge
- Lille Langebro
- Limfjordsbroen
- Little Belt Bridge
- Little Belt Bridge (1970)
- Masnedsund Bridge
- Munkholm Bridge
- Oresund Bridge (Connects to Sweden)
- Queen Alexandrine Bridge
- Ravning Bridge (demolished)
- Sallingsund Bridge
- Siøsund Bridge
- Storstrøm Bridge
- Svendborgsund Bridge
- Teglværksbroen
- Vejle Fjord Bridge
- Vilsund Bridge

== Notes and references ==
- Nicolas Janberg. "International Database for Civil and Structural Engineering". Structurae.com.
- Others references

== See also ==
- List of tunnels of the Faroe Islands
- Transport in Denmark
- Transport in Greenland
- Rail transport in Denmark
- Motorways in Denmark
- Geography of Denmark
