= Queen Margrethe II's Bridge =

Queen Margrethe II's Bridge Dronning Margrethe II's Bro
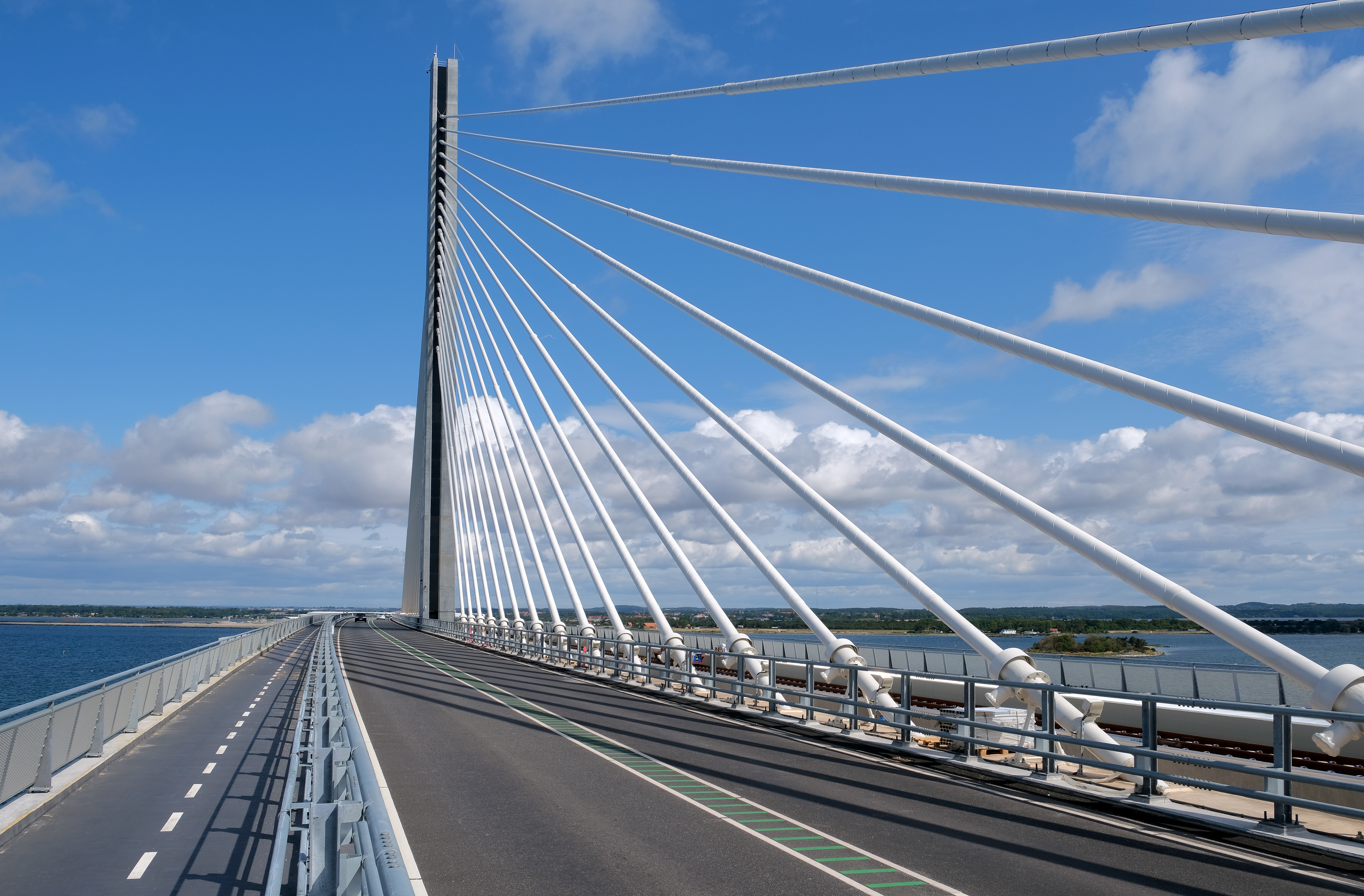
- View of the main span from the bicycle path (August 2026)
- Coordinates: 54°58′27″N 11°52′04″E
- Carries: Pedestrians; Bicycles; Road traffic; Rail traffic
- Crosses: Storstrømmen
- Locale: Region Zealand, Denmark
- Named for: Margrethe II

Characteristics
- Design: Cable-stayed bridge
- Total length: 3.832 km (2.381 mi)
- Width: 24 m (79 ft)
- Height: 102 m (335 ft)
- Longest span: 160 m (520 ft)
- Clearance below: 26 m (85 ft)
- No. of lanes: 2

Rail characteristics
- No. of tracks: 2
- Track gauge: 1,435 mm (4 ft 8 1/2 in) standard gauge
- Electrified: 25 kV 50 Hz

History
- Construction start: 2018
- Construction end: 2026
- Construction cost: c. 4.7 billion DKK
- Opened: March 23, 2026 (road traffic)
- Inaugurated: June 6, 2026
- Replaces: Storstrøm Bridge (1937)

Location
- Interactive map of Queen Margrethe II's Bridge

Queen Margrethe II's Bridge (Danish: Dronning Margrethe II's Bro), also known as the New Storstrøm Bridge (Danish: Den nye Storstrømsbro), is a bridge connecting the Danish islands of Masnedø and Falster across Storstrømmen. It is a cable-stayed bridge carrying pedestrian, bicycle, road and rail traffic.

Built to replace the ageing Storstrøm Bridge from 1937, it was opened to road, bicycle and pedestrian traffic on 23 March 2026, while its opening to rail traffic is scheduled for 2027. A formal dedication took place on 6 June 2026. It was scheduled to be inaugurated by Queen Margrethe II herself, but she was unable to attend due to illness, and Crown Prince Christian participated in her stead.

== History ==
The winning bid to construct the bridge was submitted by the Italian companies Itinera, Grandi Lavori Fincosit and Condotte, forming the Storstroem Bridge Joint Venture I/S (SBJV), with Seteco Ingegneria as advisor. However, Condotte went into reconstruction shortly after winning the bid, leaving Itinera and Grandi Lavori Fincosit to construct the bridge. Shortly thereafter, Grandi Lavori Fincosit was also forced to drop out, leaving Itinera alone to build the bridge.

== See also ==
- List of bridges in Denmark
