= Anker Engelund =

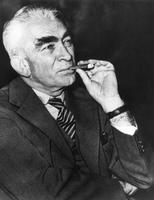
- Anker Engelund
- Born: 30 May 1889; Randers
- Died: 6 June 1961 (aged 72); Copenhagen
- Occupations: Civil engineer Senior Professor

Anker Dolleris Engelund (30 May 1889 – 6 June 1961) was a Danish civil engineer and university professor.

== Career ==
In 1928, he became professor of building statics at the Technical University of Denmark. He became rector of the technical university (1941–1959), during the period of the university's expansion at Østervold. Despite restricted admissions, the university still did not have sufficient space and Engelund was responsible for developing plans for further expansion. This resulted in a decision in 1958 to move the university to Lyngby. Anker Engelunds Vej at the university Lyngby campus is named after him. Engelund developed the idea of creating the Danish Ingeniørakademi - The Engineering Academy, where there would be less emphasis on the theoretical aspects of engineering, and shorter courses. He was responsible for setting up a Danish inspection body to inspect welds in load-bearing structures and pressure vessels (1940).

Engelund was responsible for the design work on:

- King Christian X's Bridge (1930)
- Storstrøm Bridge (1937)
- Vilsund Bridge
- Queen Alexandrine Bridge (1943).
