= King Christian X's Bridge =

King Christian X's Bridge Kong Christian den X's Bro
- King Christian X's Bridge as seen from Jomfrusti, Sønderborg (2023)
- Coordinates: 54°54′40″N 9°47′02″E
- Crosses: Alssund
- Locale: Sønderborg
- Named for: Christian X

Characteristics
- Design: Tied-arch bridge; Bascule bridge
- Total length: 331 m (1,086 ft)
- Width: 12.6 m (41 ft)
- Clearance below: 5 m (16 ft)
- No. of lanes: 2

Rail characteristics
- No. of tracks: None; Single (original)

History
- Opened: October 7, 1930

Location
- Interactive map of King Christian X's Bridge

King Christian X's Bridge (Danish: Kong Christian den X's Bro) is a bridge connecting Jutland and Als across Alssund in Sønderborg, Denmark.

The bridge carries pedestrians, cyclists and road vehicles. It originally also had a railway track that connected Sønderborg railway station with the harbour, and between 1933 and 1962, also carried the Als Line.

== See also ==
- List of bridges in Denmark
- Alssund Bridge, another bridge crossing Alssund
