= Queen Alexandrine Bridge =

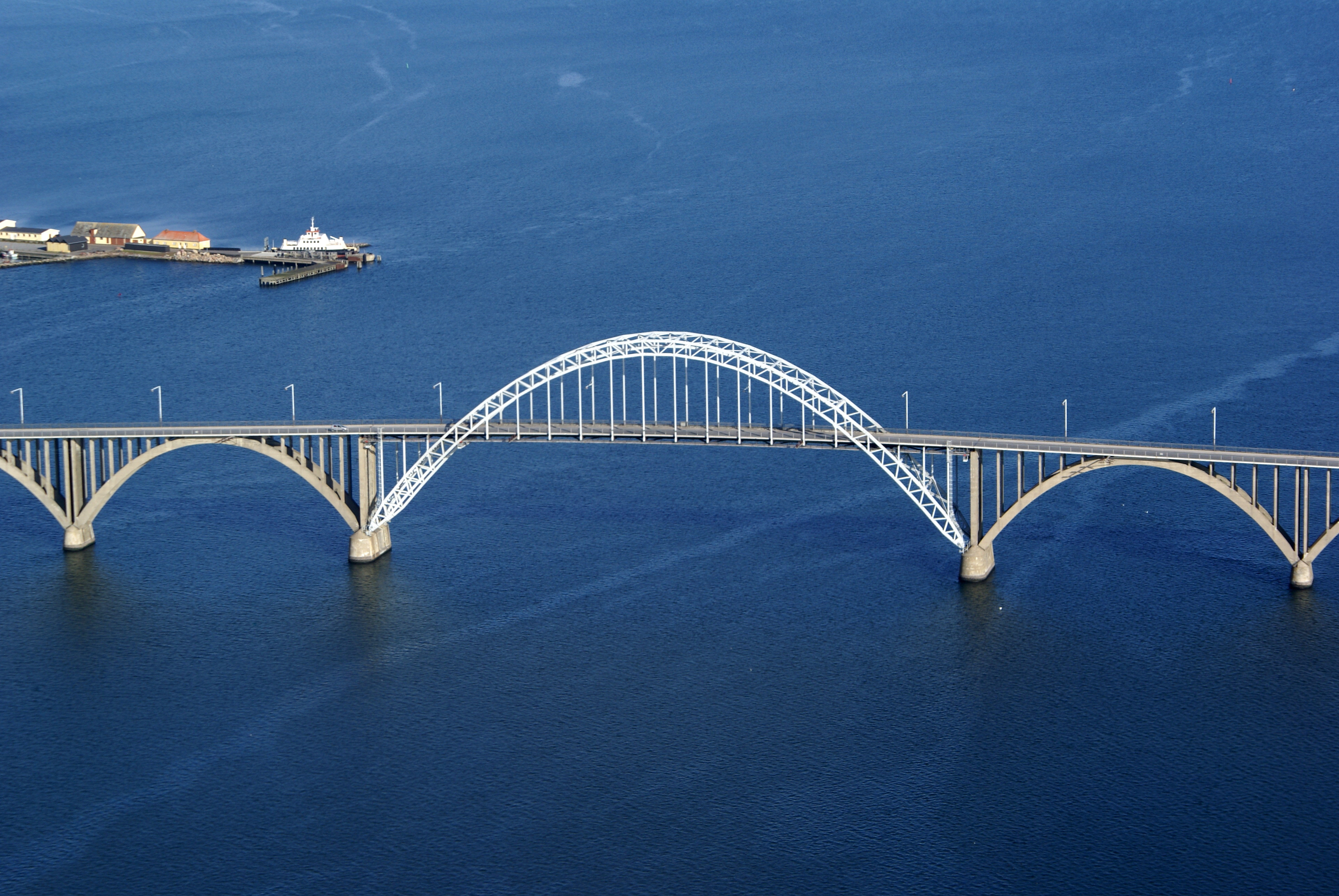
- The bridge viewed from Zealand
- Coordinates: 54°59′22″N 12°09′53″E
- Crosses: Ulvsund strait
- Locale: Zealand and Møn, Denmark
- Named for: Queen Alexandrine of Denmark

Characteristics
- Total length: 745.5 metres (2,445.9 ft)
- Width: 10.7 metres (35.1 ft)
- Longest span: 127.5 metres (418.3 ft)
- Clearance below: 26 metres (85 ft)

History
- Architect: Anker Engelund
- Opened: 30 May 1943

Location
- Interactive map of Queen Alexandrine Bridge

The Queen Alexandrine Bridge (Danish: Dronning Alexandrines Bro) is a steel arch bridge carrying Highway 59 across Ulv Sund between the Danish islands of Zealand and Møn. Designed by Anker Engelund and constructed between 1939 and 1943, the bridge has a total length of 745 metres and an 11-metre-wide deck. Its main span consists of a 128-metre-long parabolic through arch, flanked on either side by five smaller deck arches. The bridge is depicted on the Danish 500-kroner banknote issued in 2011.

== History ==
The bridge is named after Alexandrine of Mecklenburg-Schwerin. It was the main road connection between the islands of Zealand and Møn until the Farø Bridges were opened in 1985, which now provide a road link to the western end of Møn.

Construction commenced 1939 and the bridge was opened on 30 May 1943. It is of steel arched construction, having 10 piers in the sea from which the arches spring. The designer of the bridge is Anker Engelund (1889–1961). He was a civil engineer, professor and rector of the Copenhagen Polytechnic educational institution from 1941 to 1959. "He created a classic arch bridge whose superstructure of a large steel arch in the center and ten iron arches, below the roadway lie is worn".

== Features ==
The Bridge is 745.5 metres long and 10.7 metres wide. The central arch span is 127.5 metres, and the maximum clearance to the sea is 26 metres.

On the western side, the bridge carries crossbars, which carry a single-circuit 50 kV-powerline to Møn island.

== Banknote ==
Since 2011, the Queen Alexandrine Bridge has been depicted on the 500 kroner note issued by Danmarks Nationalbank.

== Panorama ==
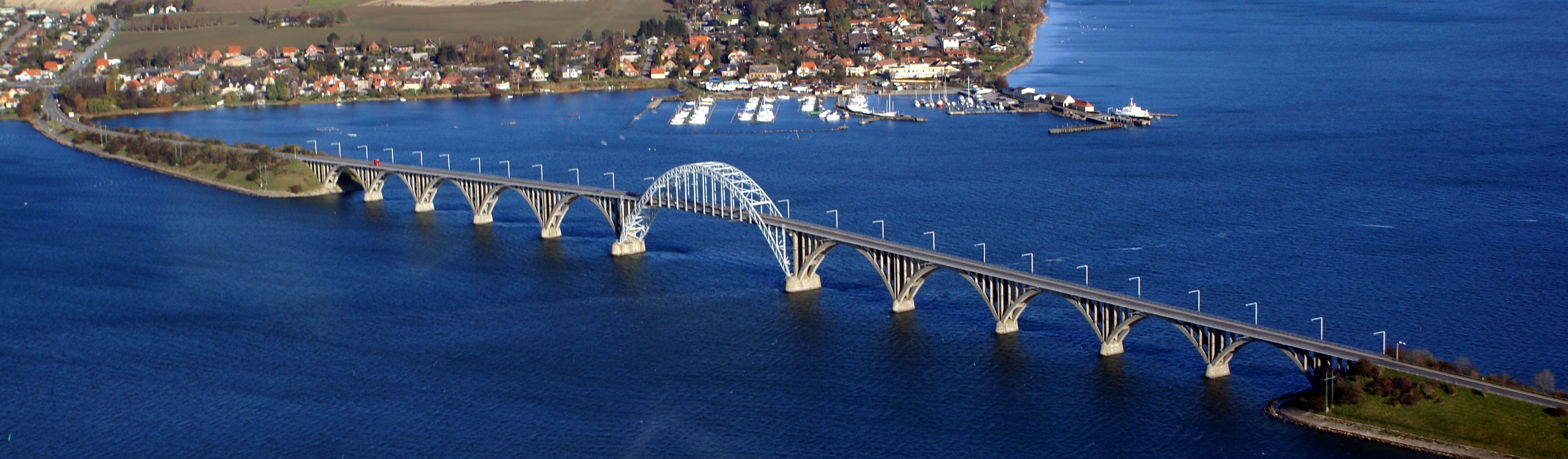
Aerial of the bridge
