= Vilsund Bridge =

Bridge across the Limfjord in Denmark

Coordinates: 56°53′03″N 8°37′53″E

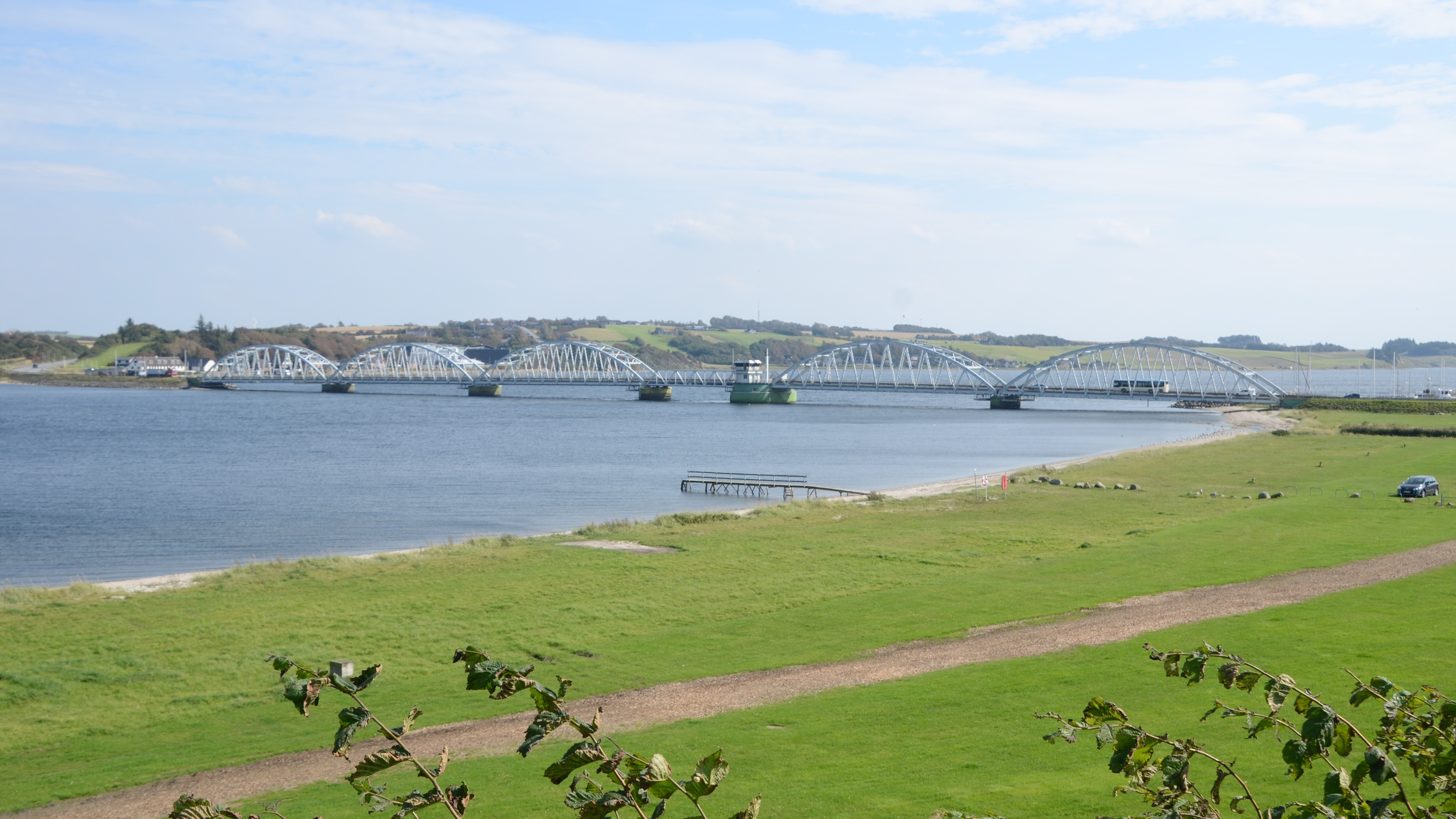
Vilsund Bridge

Vilsund Bridge (Vilsundbroen) is a bascule arch bridge that crosses Vilsund between Mors and Thy in northwestern Jutland, Denmark. The bridge is 382 metres long, and the longest span is 30 metres.

Vilsund Bridge was designed by Anker Engelund. Construction started in 1937, and the bridge was opened on 16 July 1939.

== See also ==
- Sallingsund Bridge, connecting Mors and Salling
- List of bridges in Denmark
