= MT Højgaard =

Leading construction and civil engineering companies in the Nordic countries

- Type: Private company
- Industry: Construction, Civil engineering
- Founded: 2001
- Headquarters: Søborg, Denmark
- Key people: Torben Biilmann, (CEO)
- Revenue: DKK6,979 million (2014)
- Operating income: DKK207 million (2014)
- Net income: DKK(252) million (2014)
- Number of employees: 3,846 (2014)
- Subsidiaries: Ajos, Enemærke & Petersen, Lindpro, Scandi Byg, Greenland Contractors, Seth
- Website: mth.com

MT Højgaard Group is one of the leading construction and civil engineering companies in the Nordic countries. The Group works with customers throughout Denmark and in multiple countries overseas. The company was founded in 2001, when Højgaard & Schultz and Monberg & Thorsen merged to form MT Højgaard.

The Group consists of MT Højgaard as well as a number of specialized wholly and partly owned subsidiaries. MT Højgaard Group solves all needs within construction and civil engineering from designing to building bridges, housing and business property. The Group also works offshore and has installed the offshore wind turbine foundations.

MT Højgaard's headquarters is located in Søborg, close to Copenhagen, and has local offices throughout Denmark and overseas. In 2014, the company had a turnover of DKK 7 billion and employed nearly 4,000 people.

== History ==
Højgaard & Schultz was founded by Knud Højgaard and Sven Schultz in 1918 and Monberg & Thorsen was founded by Axel Monberg and Ejnar Thorsen in 1919. One of the first major projects undertaken by Højgaard & Schultz was the construction of the Port of Gdynia in Poland which was completed in 1935. Monberg & Thorsen also established its reputation as a civil engineering business in 1935 with the opening of the Little Belt Bridge. Monberg & Thorsen was later involved in the Pont de Normandie in France completed in 1995 and the Millennium Bridge in London completed in 2000. The two companies worked together on the construction of the Farø Bridges completed in 1985, on the Great Belt Fixed Link completed in 1998 and then on the Øresund Bridge completed in 2000.

Højgaard & Schultz merged with Monberg & Thorsen to form MT Højgaard in 2001.

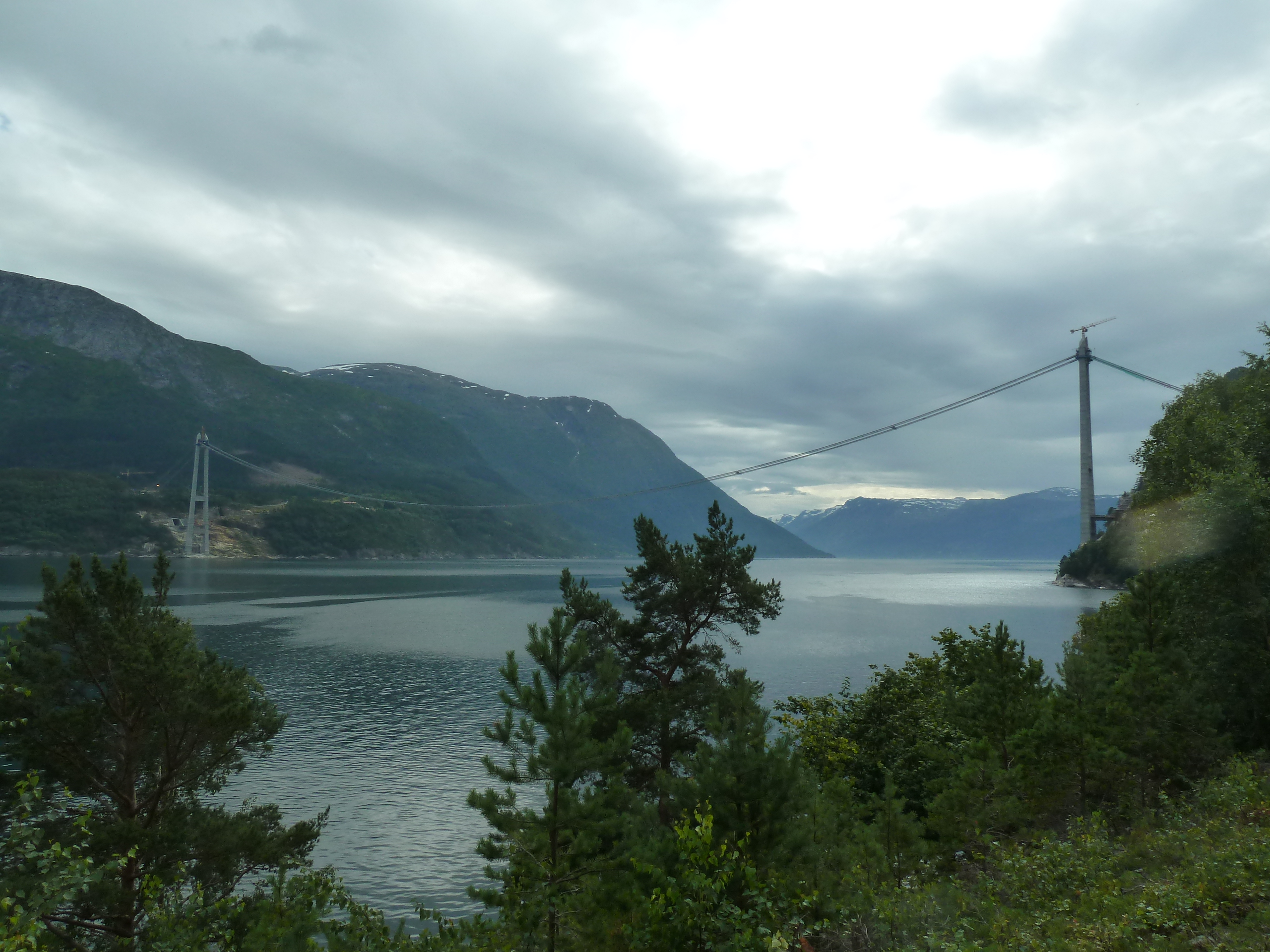
The Hardanger Bridge being built by MT Højgaard

== Operations ==
The business is organised as follows:

- MT Højgaard - civil engineering, construction and refurbishment
- Ajos - leasing of plant & equipment
- Enemærke & Petersen - refurbishment and new build
- Greenland Contractors - daily operations, including construction, service and maintenance projects, at Pituffik Space Base in Greenland
- Scandi BYG - industrial modular buildings
- Seth - marine works in Portugal and Africa

The business has been developing the Lincs Wind Farm off the UK. The business is still owned 54% by Højgaard A/S and 46% by Monberg & Thorsen A/S, both of which holding companies are listed on the Nasdaq Copenhagen.

== Major projects ==
Major projects carried out by the company since the merger include Field's Shopping Centre in Denmark completed in 2004, a new concert hall for the Danish Broadcasting Corporation completed in 2007, the Nuuk Center in Greenland completed in 2012 and the Hardanger Bridge in Norway completed in 2013.
