= Masnedsund Bridge =

Bridge in Denmark

Masnedsund Bridge Masnedsundbroen
- Coordinates: 54°59′48″N 11°53′23″E
- Carries: Pedestrians; Bicycles; Motor vehicles; Trains
- Crosses: Masnedsund

Characteristics
- Design: Bascule bridge
- Total length: 201.0 metres (659 ft)
- Width: 14.0 metres (46 ft)
- Longest span: 25.0 metres (82 ft)
- No. of lanes: 2

Rail characteristics
- No. of tracks: 1
- Track gauge: 1,435 mm (4 ft 8 1/2 in)

History
- Construction start: 1933
- Construction end: 1937
- Opened: 6 August 1937

Location
- Interactive map of Masnedsund Bridge

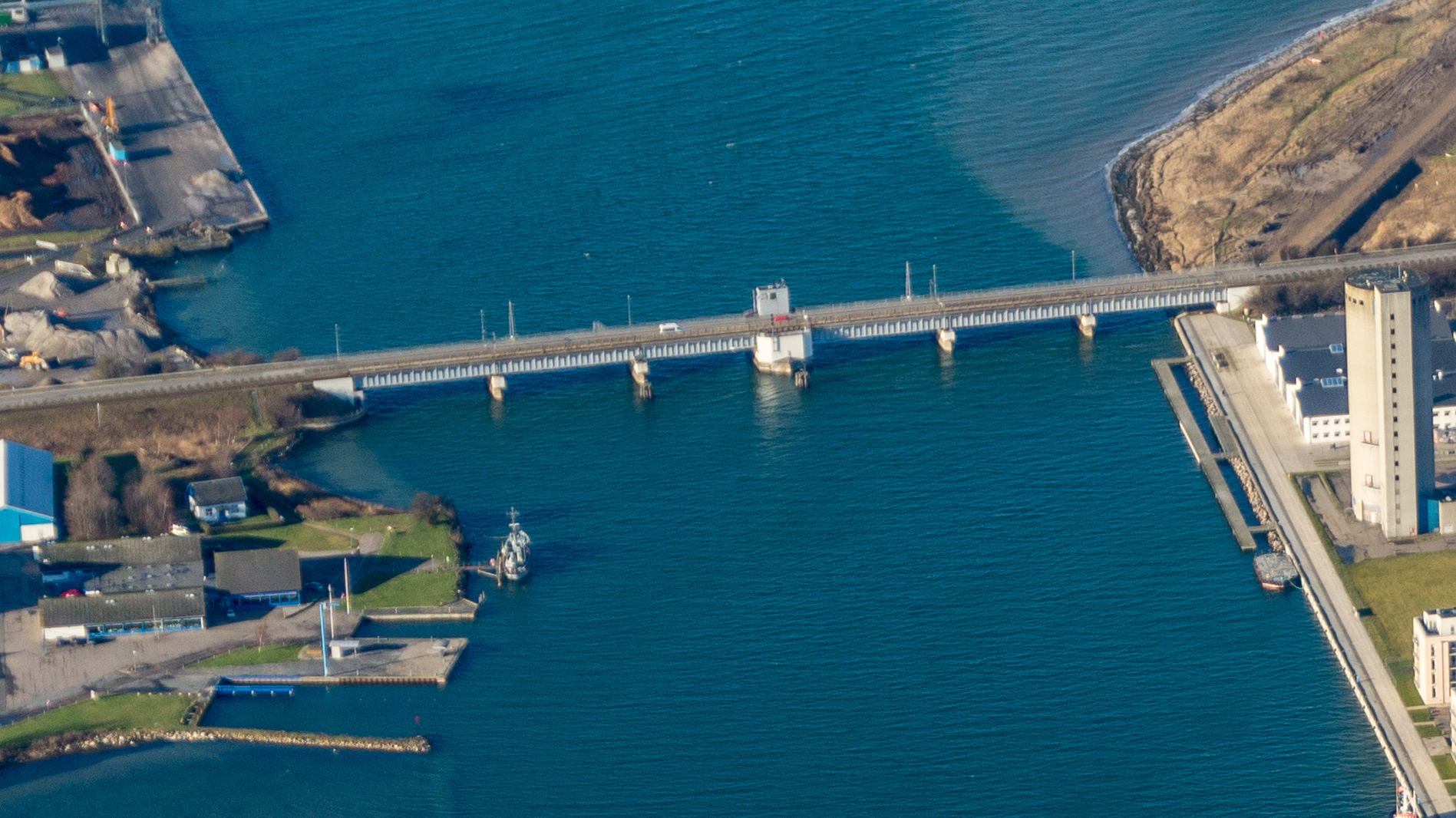
Masnedsundbroen

The Masnedsund Bridge (Danish: Masnedsundbroen) is a bascule bridge that crosses Masnedsund between the islands Masnedø and Zealand (Danish: Sjælland) in Denmark. It carries road and railway traffic, as well as pedestrians and bicycles.

Together with Storstrøm Bridge it connects Falster and Zealand and was the main road connection between the islands until the Farø Bridges were opened in 1985. It was officially opened on 6 August 1937, and replaced an older railway bridge that was opened on 15 January 1884, and a ferry. The new bridges were commissioned by the Danish state railways (Danske Statsbaner) and designed by them with assistance from Christiani & Nielsen A/S of Copenhagen. Construction was by Dorman Long and company, with Christiani & Nielsen acting as sub-contractors responsible for foundations and reinforced concrete sections. The contract for the work was signed on 13 May 1933.

The bridge is 201 metres long and 8.8 metres wide, with main span of 25 metres. It rests on five piers, with abutments at either end. One of the piers contains the machinery for operating the bascule. Each pier has concrete foundations set into the bed of the sea. A cofferdam was placed around each pier site, before excavating and then filling with concrete. After the base slab had been laid, the cofferdams could be emptied of water and the rest of the pier was constructed. Timber piles were used for the construction of the abutment foundations, and to reinforce one of the piers.

On 12 December 1935 an English steam ship ran into the old Masnedsund Bridge, and destroyed part of it. At that time the new bridge was being built, and it was decided to hasten the building. The railway part of the new bridge was opened on 22 December 1935.

The movable span was permanently locked down in 2016; the last opening of the bridge occurred on 15 July 2016. The railway part of the bridge will be replaced by a new, separate bridge across Masnedsund by 2019–2020.

== See also ==
- List of bridges in Denmark
- List of bridges
- Storstrøm Bridge
