= Munkholm Bridge =

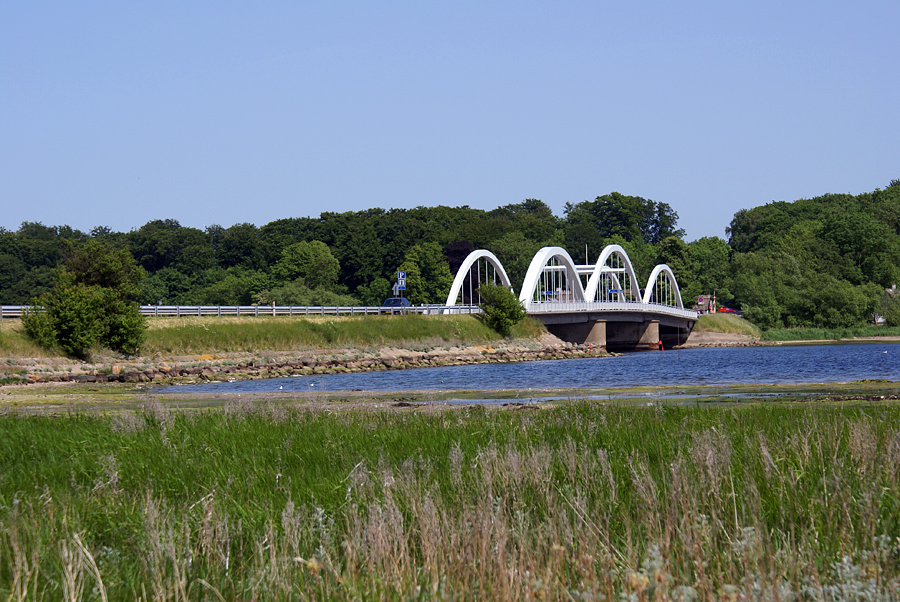
- Coordinates: 55°40′25″N 11°48′44″E
- Carries: Road
- Crosses: Ise Fjord
- Locale: Denmark

Characteristics
- Total length: 114 metres

History
- Construction end: 1951
- Opened: 1952

Munkholm Bridge (Danish: Munkholmbroen) is a 114 metres long arch bridge across the Ise Fjord linking the Holbæk area (Holbæk Municipality) with the Hornsherred peninsula (Lejre Municipality). The bridge is located six kilometers from the bottom of the inlet. It was completed in 1951 and inaugurated in 1952.

== See also ==
- List of bridges in Denmark
