= Sallingsund Bridge =

Road bridge in Denmark

Coordinates: 56°44′56″N 8°50′56″E

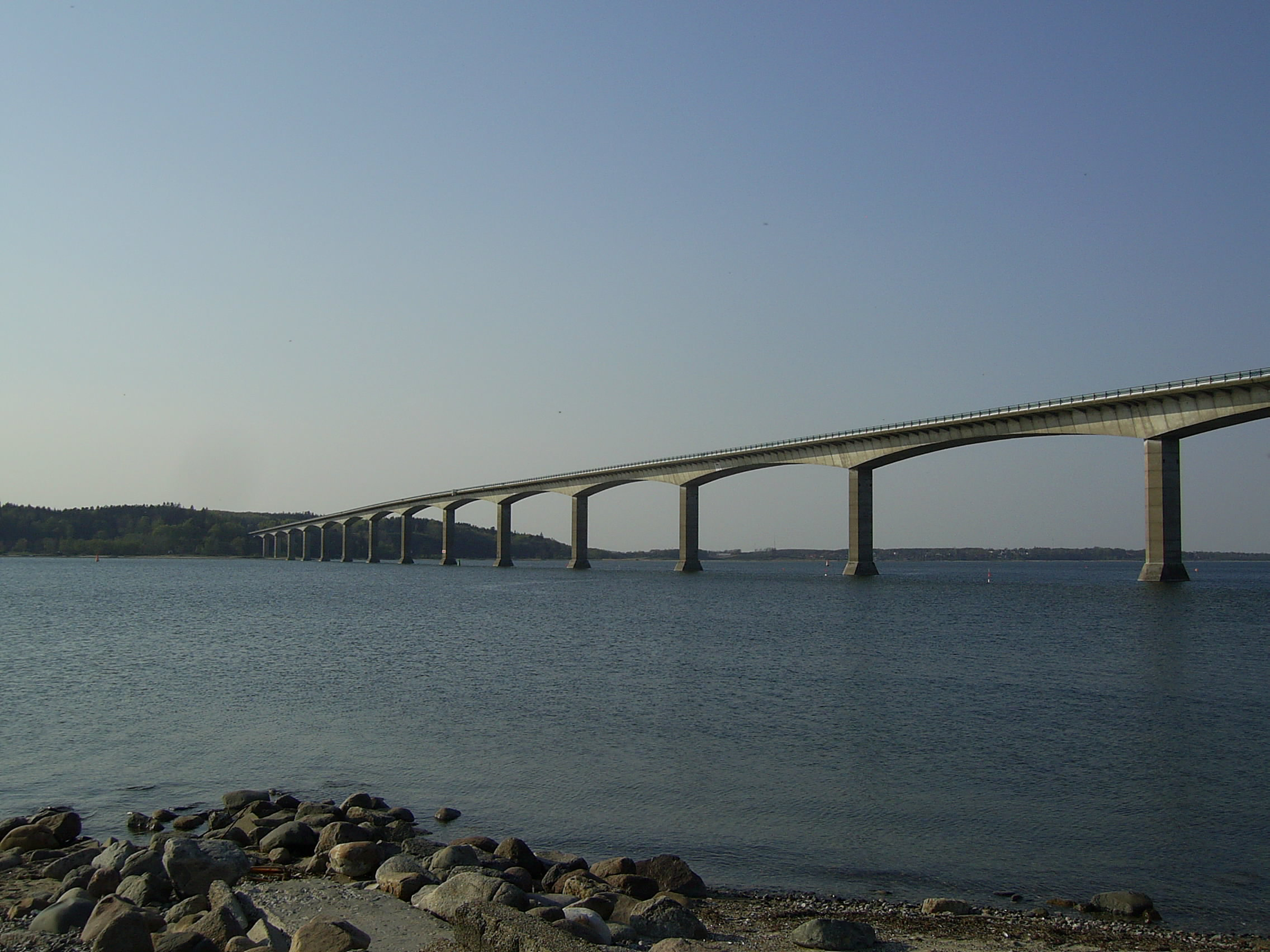
Sallingsund Bridge

Sallingsund Bridge (Danish: Sallingsundbroen) is a bridge that crosses Salling Sound between the island of Mors and the Salling Peninsula on the mainland (Jutland) in Denmark. The bridge is 1.717 kilometres (1.067 mi) long; the longest span is 93 metres, and the maximum clearance to the sea is 26 metres.

The construction of Sallingsund Bridge was initiated in 1973, and it was opened by Queen Margrethe II on 30 May 1978. Before the bridge was built, people and cars were taken across the sound by the ferries Pinen (Pain) and Plagen (Bother). In 1976, a million passengers and half a million cars were ferried across the sound.

The bridge has been featured on the Danish 50-krone banknote since 2009.

== See also ==
- Vilsund Bridge, connecting Mors and Thy
- List of bridges in Denmark
- List of bridges
