= Farø =

Island in Denmark

Coordinates: 54°57′1″N 11°59′29″E

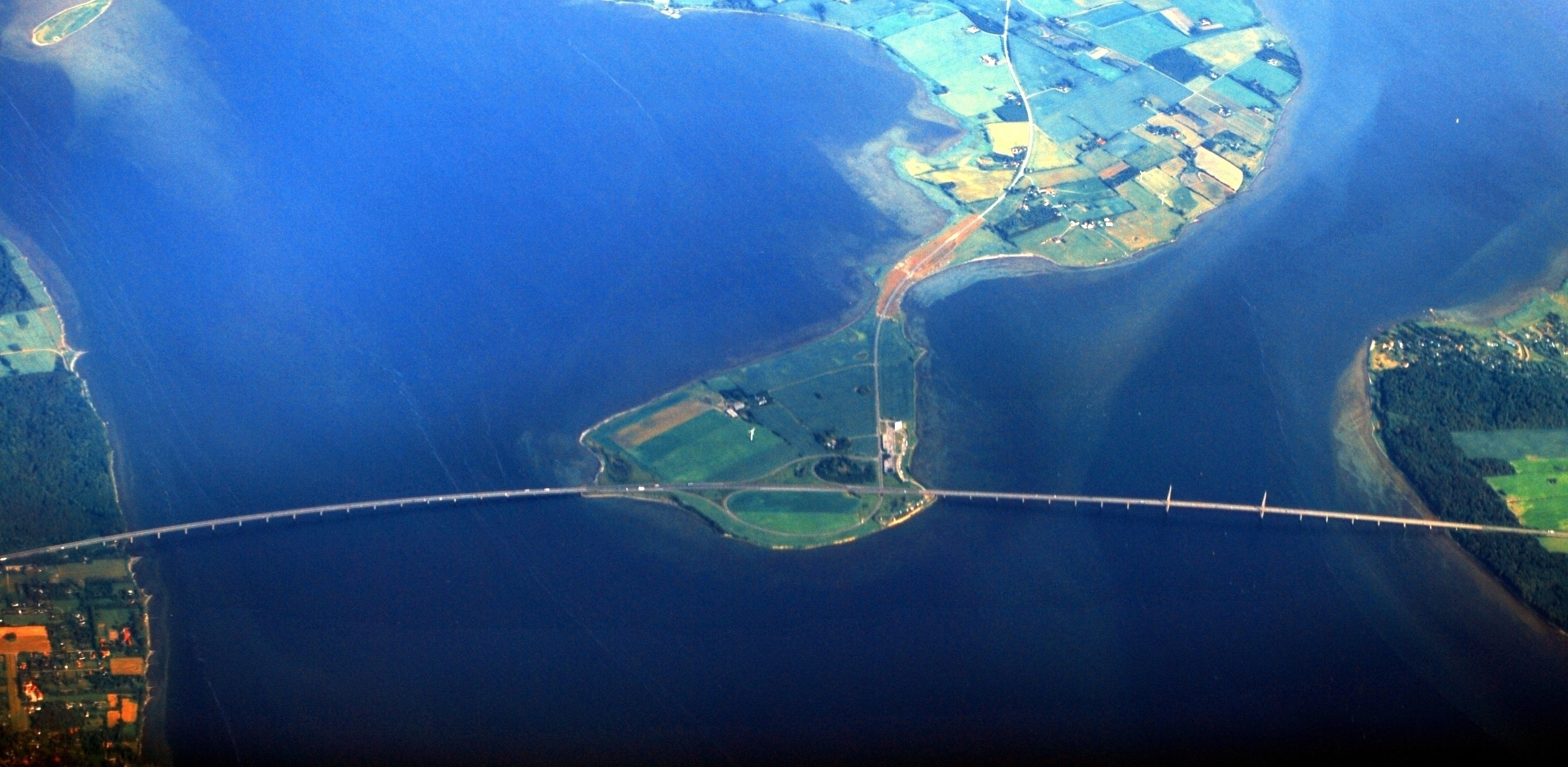
- Farø Bridges aerial view (June 2010)

Geography
- Location: Storstrømmen
- Area: 0.93 km^{2} (0.36 sq mi)

Administration
- Denmark
- Region: Region Zealand
- Municipality: Vordingborg Municipality

Demographics
- Population: 6 (2006)

Farø (Danish pronunciation: [ˈfɑːˌʁœˀ]) is an island in Denmark, located between the islands Sjælland and Falster. It has an area of 0.93 km^{2} and has a population of four people (2019). Administratively it is part of Vordingborg Municipality.

== Access to the island ==
The Farø Bridges (Farøbroerne) connect Sjælland with Falster via Farø, on the European Routes E47 and E55 combined. Junction 42 of E55 is located on the western side of Farø. The island is connected by causeway with the islands of Bogø and Møn by route 287 Grønsundvej.
