= Little Belt Bridge (1970) =

Suspension bridge in Denmark

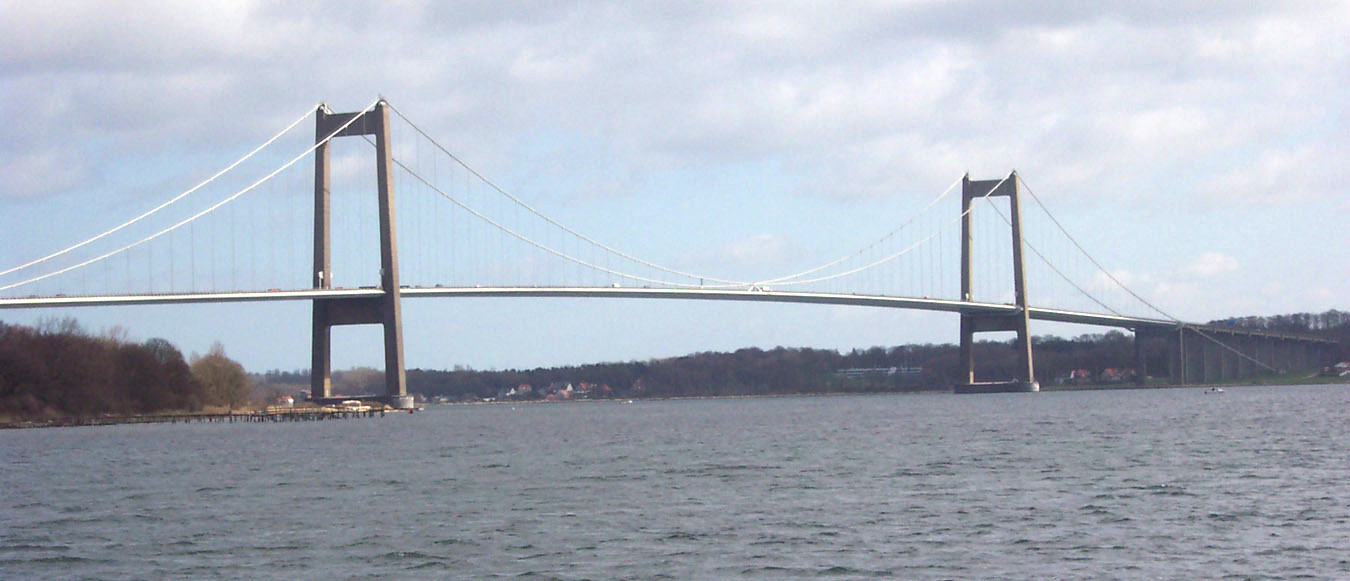
- Coordinates: 55°31′07″N 9°44′57″E
- Carries: European route E20
- Crosses: Little Belt

Characteristics
- Design: Suspension bridge
- Total length: 1,700 m
- Width: 33.3 m
- Height: 120 m
- Longest span: 600 m (1,969 ft)
- Clearance below: 42 m
- No. of lanes: 6

History
- Designer: C. Ostenfeld & W. Jønson Consulting Engineers (COWI)
- Construction start: 1965
- Opened: 21 October 1970

Location
- Interactive map of Little Belt Bridge

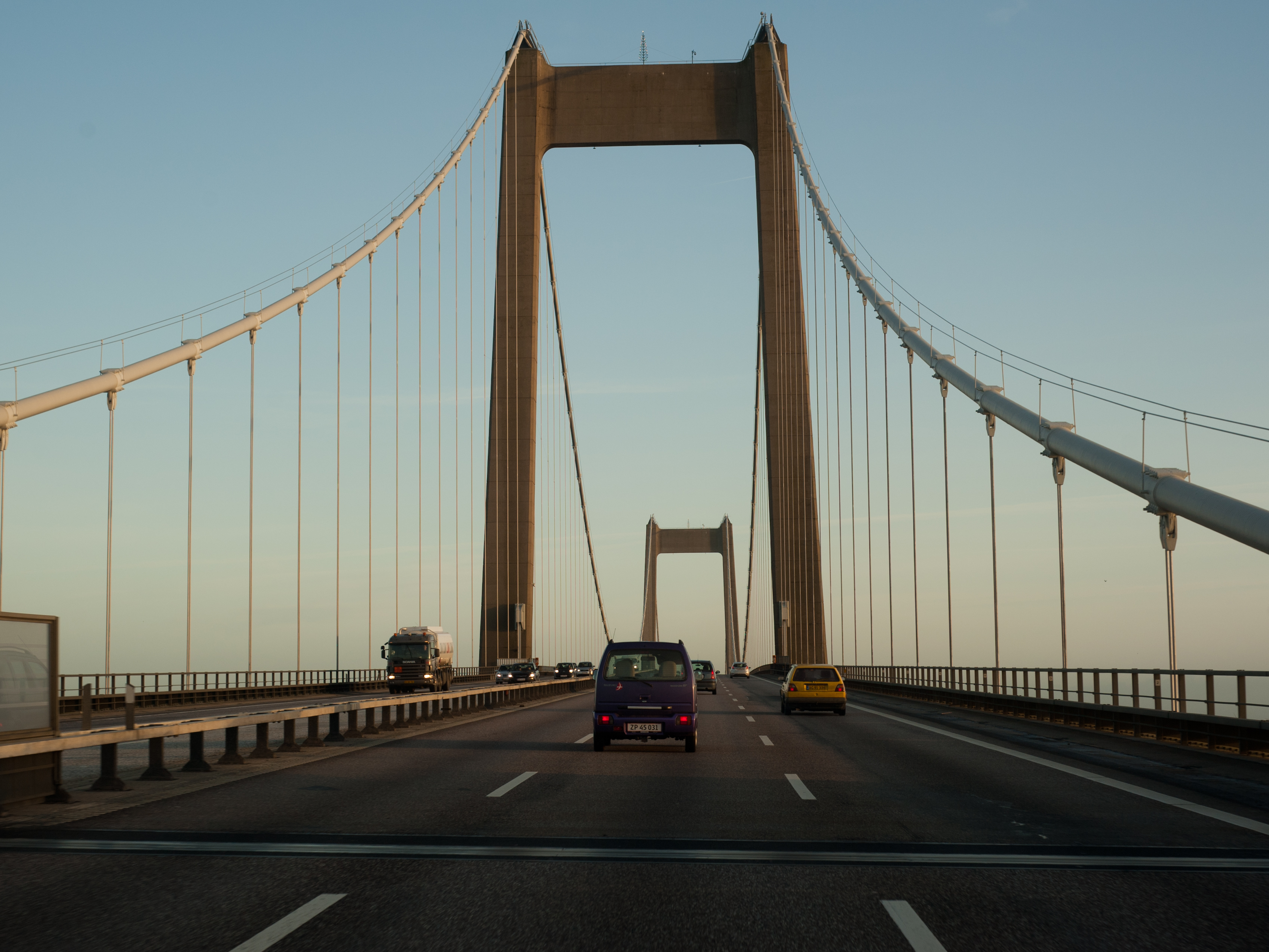
The three-lane E20 highway on the bridge (looking east)

The New Little Belt Bridge (Danish: Nye Lillebæltsbro) is a suspension bridge that crosses the Little Belt strait between Jutland (Jylland) and the island of Funen (Fyn) in Denmark. The bridge is 1,700 metres long, the main span is 600 metres, the pylons reaching a height of 120 metres, and the maximum clearance from the sea is 44 metres.

== Construction ==
The New Little Belt Bridge was built from 1965 to 1970. The cables were made by British Ropes.

== Opening ==
It was opened by King Frederik IX on 21 October 1970.

The bridge was constructed to alleviate congestion on the Old Little Belt Bridge due to the increasing car traffic between Jutland and Funen. It is a motorway bridge on the E20 with three-lane carriageways as opposed to the single lanes of the old bridge. The bridge has heating in the road deck, so it can be kept free of ice and snow in winter. Passing over Little Belt Bridge is toll-free.

== Cultural references ==
The new Little Belt Bridge is seen at 0:12:11 in The Olsen Gang in Jutland, marking the Olsen Gang's arrival to Jutland.

== See also ==
- List of bridges in Denmark
- List of bridges
