= Odin's Bridge =

Odin's Bridge Odins Bro
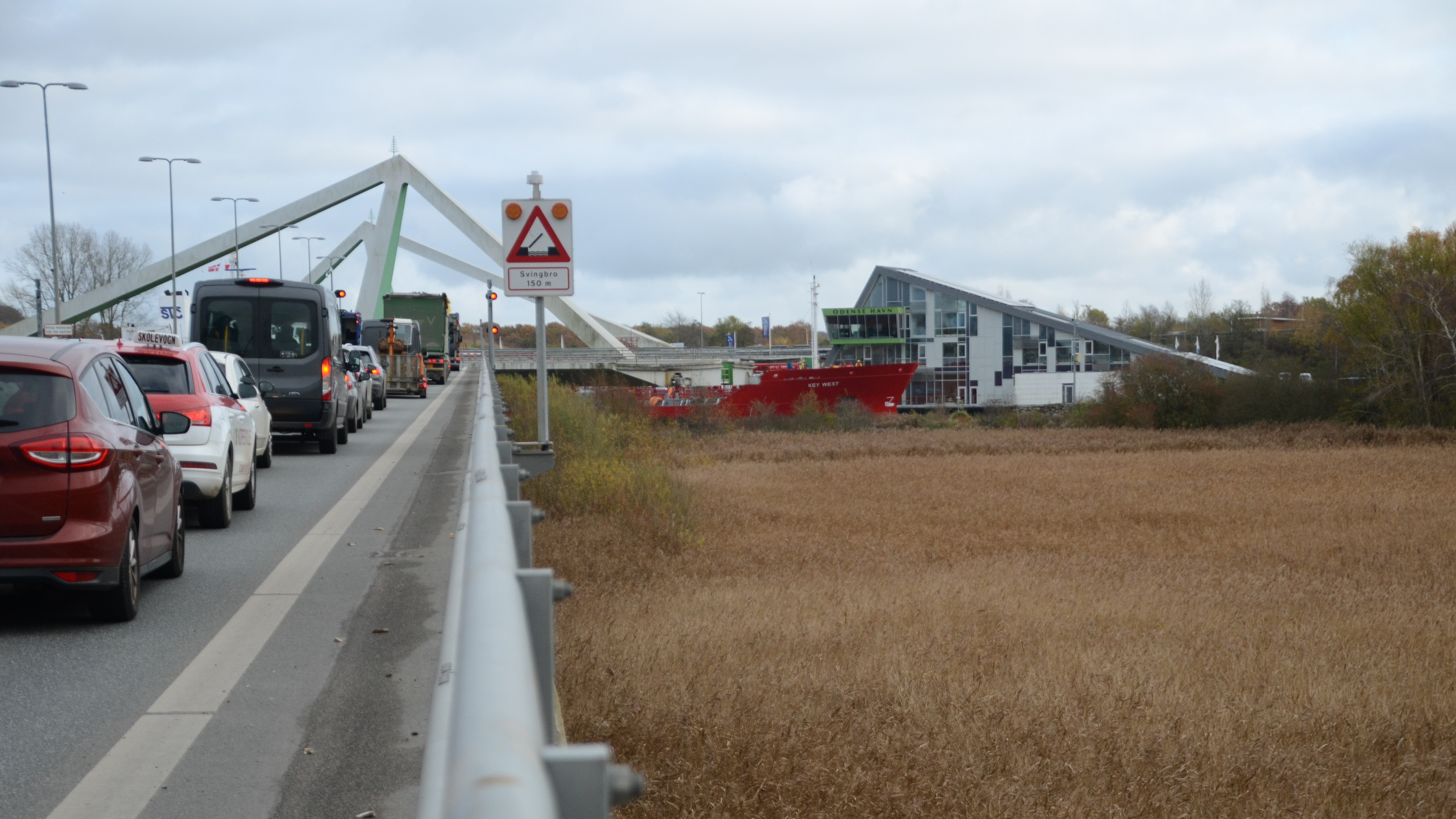
- The Ship Key West passing through Odin's Bridge in 2024
- Coordinates: 55°25′20″N 10°22′47″E
- Locale: Port of Odense

Characteristics
- Total length: 900m
- Width: 28m
- Longest span: 118m
- No. of spans: 2

History
- Construction end: 2014
- Construction cost: 525 million krona
- Inaugurated: 15 June 2014

Location
- Interactive map of Odin's Bridge

Odin's Bridge is a swing bridge over the Odense Canal, slightly north of the Danish city of Odense. The bridge was claimed to be Northern Europe's largest swing bridge ever built, with a total span of over 118 meters, which makes it a major landmark for the Port of Odense.

The bridge has a length of 900 meters, and a width of about 28 meters, with a four-lane highway, and a bidirectional bike path along the north side of the bridge. The ground for the bridge was broken by Jan Boye on 28 May 2010, and construction lasted four years until the bridge was inaugurated on 15 June 2014. The bridge was estimated to have cost 525 million Danish kroner to build, of which the Danish government provided 125 million.

== Naming ==
The name of the bridge was chosen by a naming competition, which received over 120 entries. The government of the city of Odense chose former sailor Villy Falck Hansen's suggestion of "Odin's Bridge" on 7 October 2009, in honor of the Norse god Odin, after whom the city of Odense is named. Hansen was awarded a 500 kroner voucher and a bouquet of flowers for his suggestion.

== Specifications ==
The bridge was designed by ISC Consulting Engineers and constructed by Bystrup Engineering. There are two identical bridge spans, each 96 meters long. The 900 meters of bridge passes through the Port of Odense and overlooks the 80 meter wide Odense Dam.

The bridge was designed as a swing bridge, meaning it opens for sea traffic to or from the Port of Odense, and closes for road traffic. The bridge takes 10 minutes to open, while the actual swinging motion of the bridge takes only two.
