= Masnedø =

Island in Denmark

Coordinates: 54°59′20″N 11°53′10″E

Masnedø (Danish pronunciation: [mæsnð̩ˈøˀ]) is a Danish island between Zealand and Falster. The island covers an area of 1.68 km^{2} and has 156 inhabitants.

== Transportation ==
Masnedø can be reached by the Masnedsund Bridge from Zealand or the Storstrøm Bridge from Falster. The two bridges previously formed the major road and rail link between the two larger islands, but the road link has now been replaced in this role by the larger Farø Bridges, which cross the strait via the island of Farø. In connection with the Fehmarn Belt Fixed Link, a new rail/road bridge is under construction.

== Energy ==
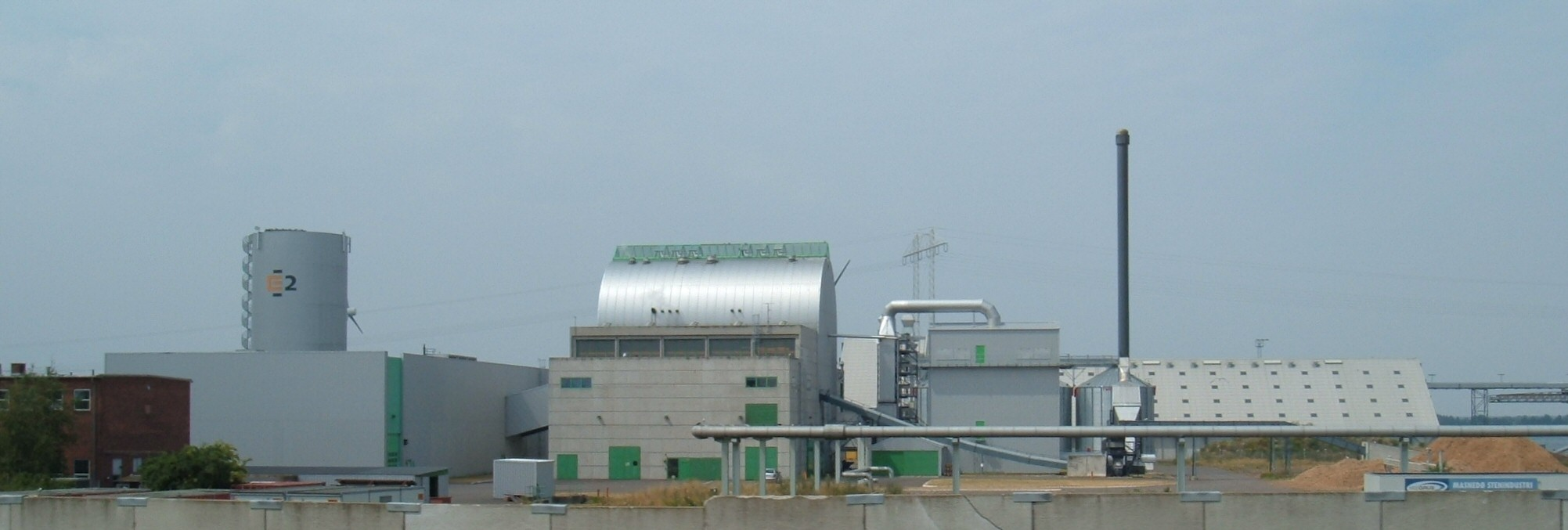
Masnedø CHP power station

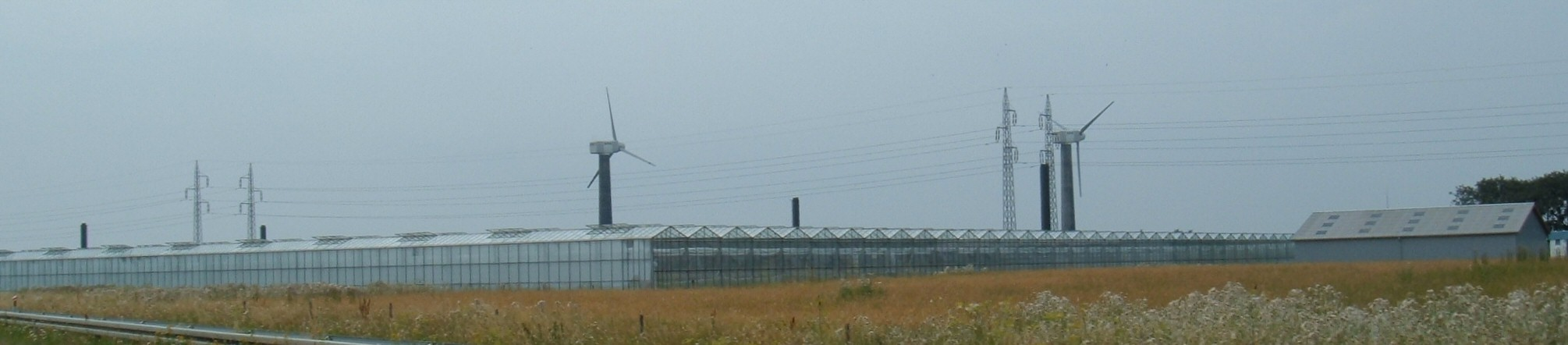
Greenhouses heated by the CHP plant

The island is home to a wind farm consisting of five 750 KW turbines, generating maximum 3.5 MW, constructed 1986. It is intended that they will be replaced with two 4MW turbines. The generating complex also includes a combined heat and power (CHP) generating plant burning straw, which provides electricity as well as heating for 7,000 homes in nearby Vordingborg. The plant produces 8.3 MW of electricity and 21 MW heat from an annual consumption of 40,000 tonnes of straw. Heating is also provided for a large area of greenhouses adjacent to the plant. From 1987, CO_{2} from the plant was used to grow tomatoes faster, but the operation ended with a loss of DKK 140 million. Residual ash is returned to local farms as fertiliser. The plant was constructed in 1996.

== Military ==
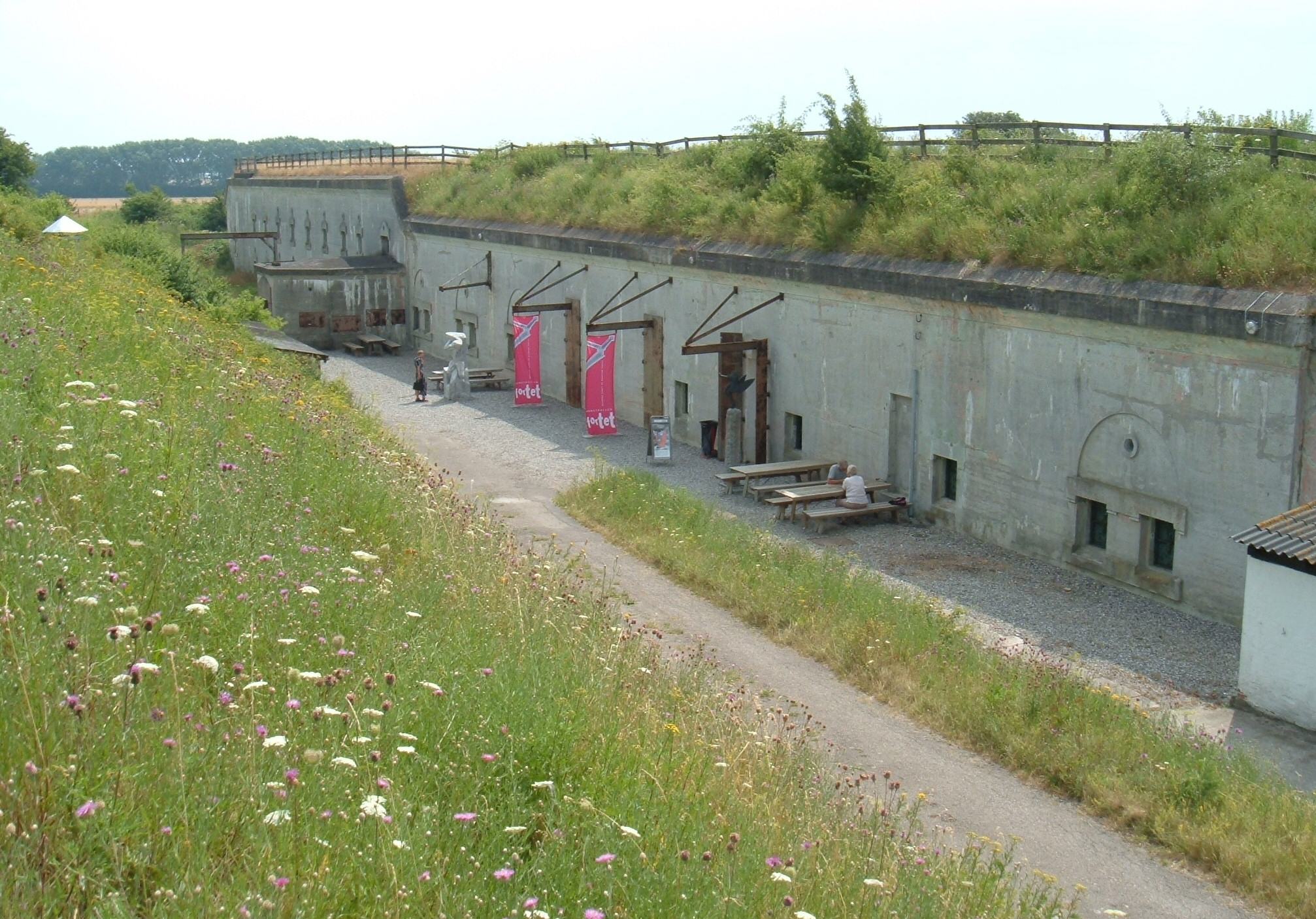
Masnedøfort, now converted to an art gallery

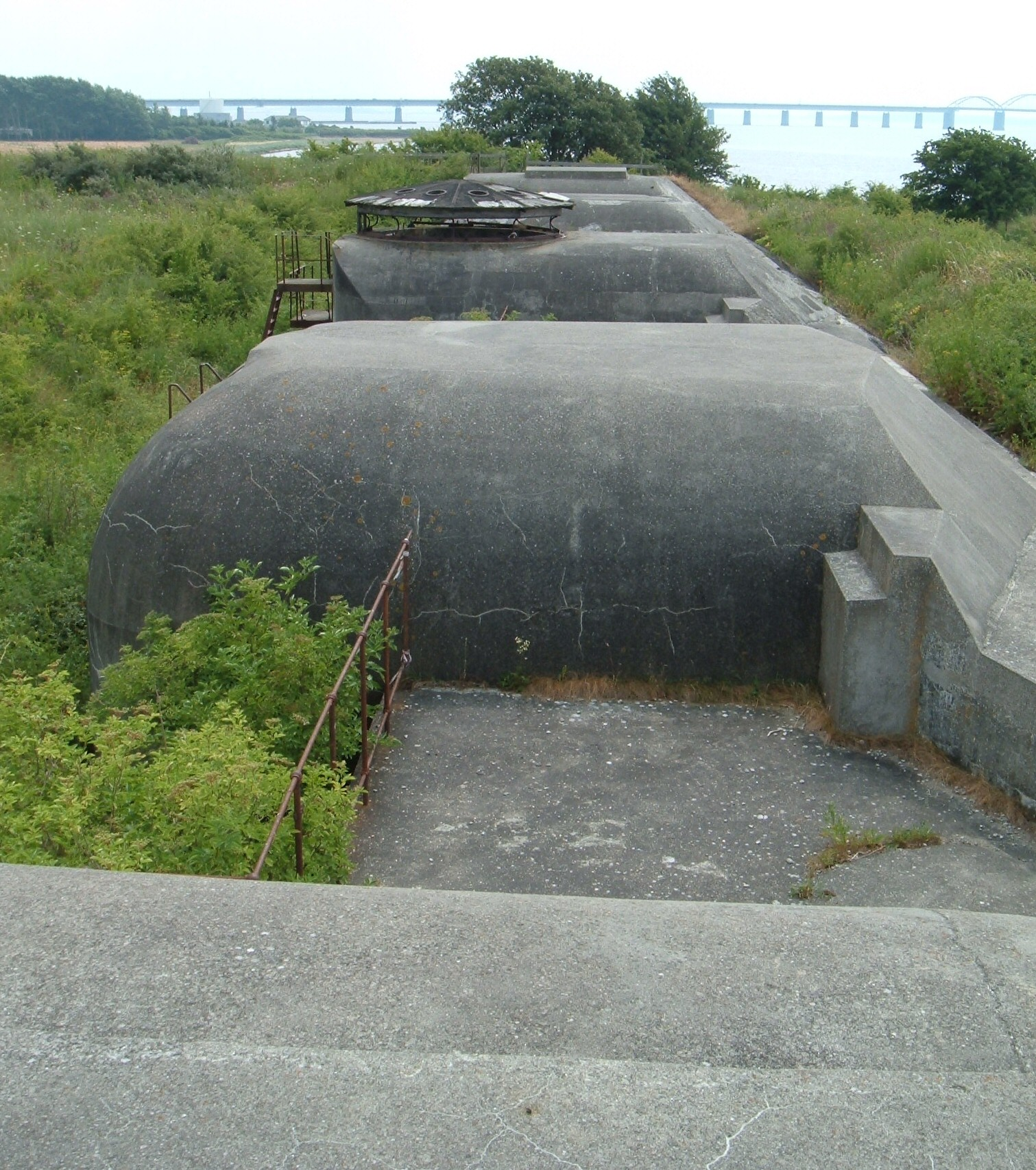
remains of gun emplacements protecting entrance to Storstrømmen

Masnedø is the site of an abandoned military defensive fort dating from 1912. The fort was a longstanding defensive position for Storstrømmen waters in wars against England and Sweden, but was also the first target in the world to be successfully attacked by paratroopers, in 1940, when it was captured by German Fallschirmjägers. The fort was taken over by the municipal authority in 1974, restored, and converted to an art gallery and home for music festivals.
