= Little Belt Bridge =

Bridge over the Little Belt strait in Denmark

Little Belt Bridge Lillebæltsbroen
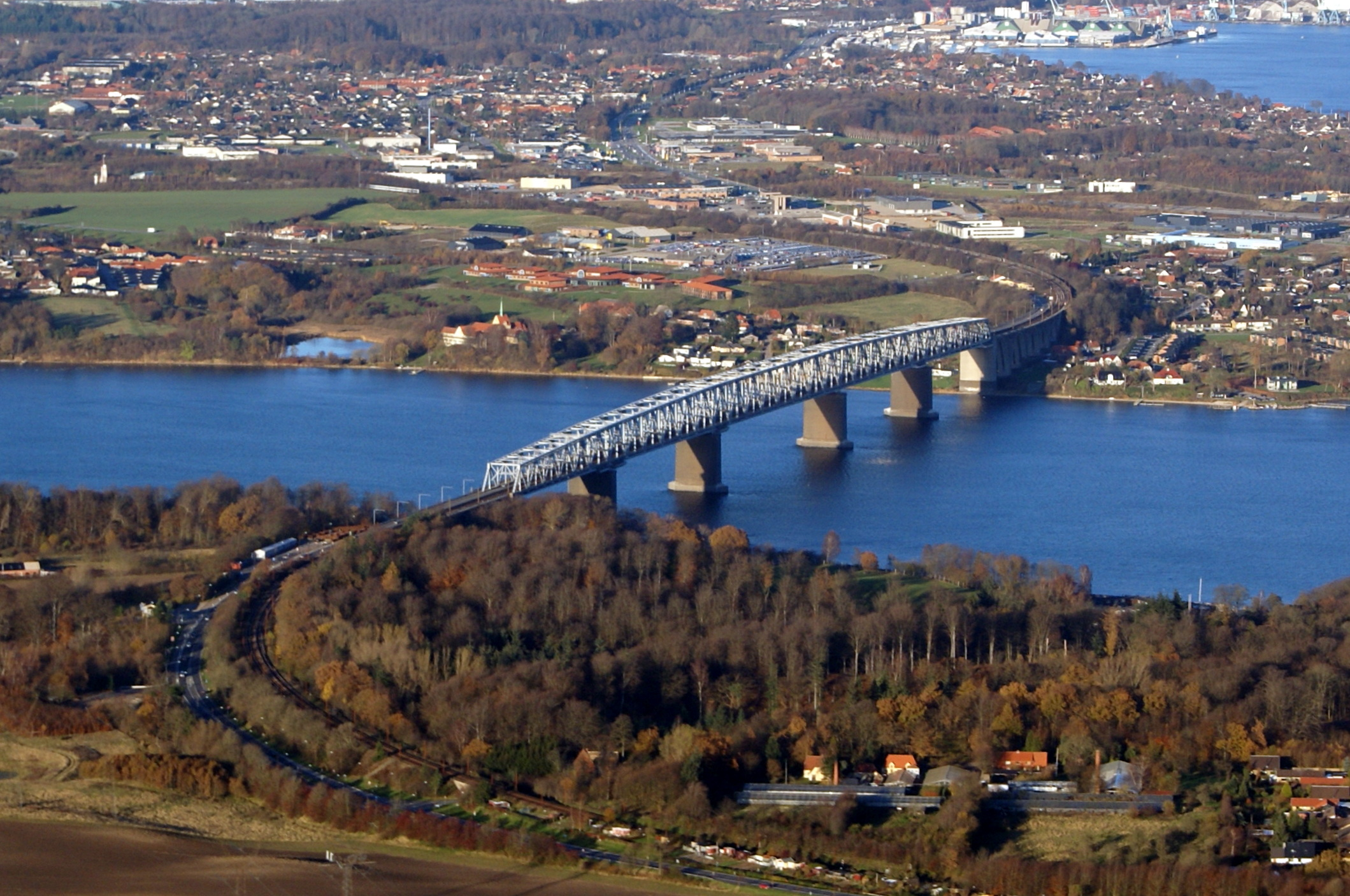
- The bridge seen from Funen (Fredericia in the background)
- Coordinates: 55°31′04″N 9°42′35″E
- Carries: The railway line between Jutland and Funen & Secondary route 161
- Crosses: The Little Belt
- Other name: Old Little Belt Bridge

Characteristics
- Design: Truss bridge
- Total length: 1,178 metres (3,865 ft)
- Width: 20.5 metres (67 ft)
- Height: 60 metres (200 ft)
- Longest span: 220 metres (722 ft)
- Clearance below: 34 metres (112 ft)

History
- Constructed by: Monberg & Thorsen
- Construction start: 1929
- Construction end: 1935
- Opened: 14 May 1935

Statistics
- Daily traffic: 10.000 cars, 210 trains daily

Location
- Interactive map of Little Belt Bridge

The Little Belt Bridge (Danish: Lillebæltsbroen), also known as the Old Little Belt Bridge (Danish: Den gamle Lillebæltsbro), is a truss bridge over the Little Belt strait in Denmark. It spans from Snoghøj on the Jutland side to Middelfart on Funen.

The bridge is owned by the Danish state, with the Danish railway authority Banedanmark responsible for maintenance. It was the first bridge constructed over the strait, beginning the connection of the three main parts of Denmark by road and rail, which was completed with the Great Belt Bridge in June 1998. Previously, only ferries and other boats had transported people over the belts.

== Construction ==
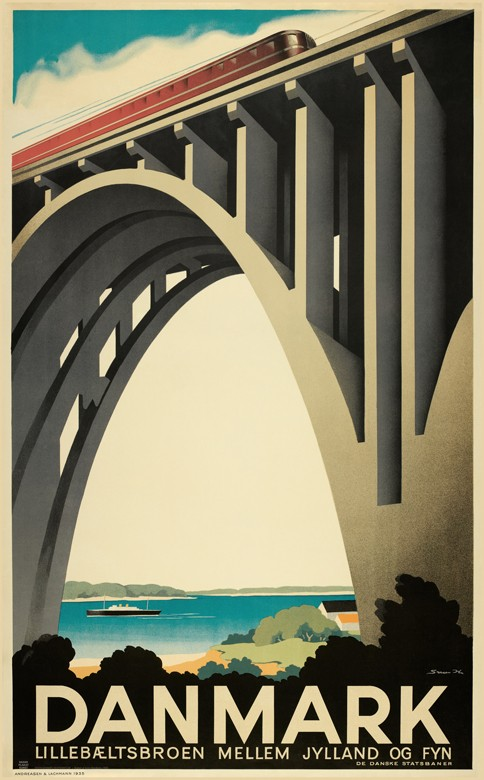
Poster from the inauguration of the Little Belt Bridge in 1935 by Sven Henriksen.

The Little Belt Bridge was built by Monberg & Thorsen. Construction of the bridge began in 1929 and it was opened for traffic on 14 May 1935. It is 1,178 metres long, 20.5 metres wide and 33 metres high, with a main span of 220 metres. On the bridge there are two railway tracks, two narrow lanes for cars to cross as well as a sidewalk for pedestrians. No mass machinery was used in the construction of the bridge at the time. The bases of the piles were lowered into the sea from boats according to precise calculations, and molds both for the piles and each end of the bridge were first constructed of wood and later manually filled with cement from buckets.

== Conversion to railway use ==
When the new Little Belt Bridge came into use in 1970, the old bridge lost its function as the main traffic line for cars between Funen and Jutland; however, it is still used as the only railway bridge between Jutland and Funen and thus the only railway line connecting Jutland with Zealand as well, as well as to carry traffic between Fredericia and Middelfart and their neighbouring villages.

== Maintenance ==
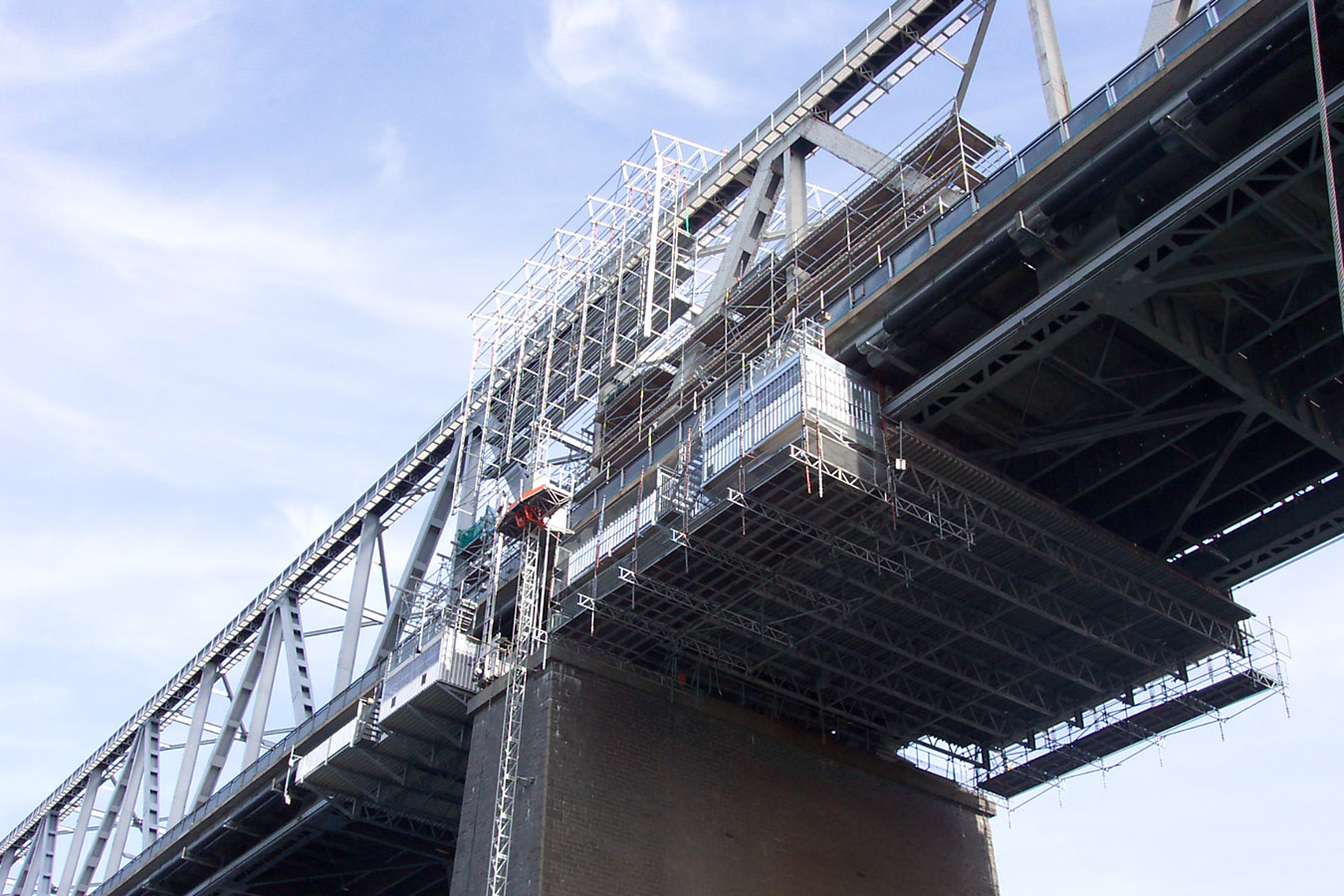
A mobile maintenance scaffold attached to the bridge

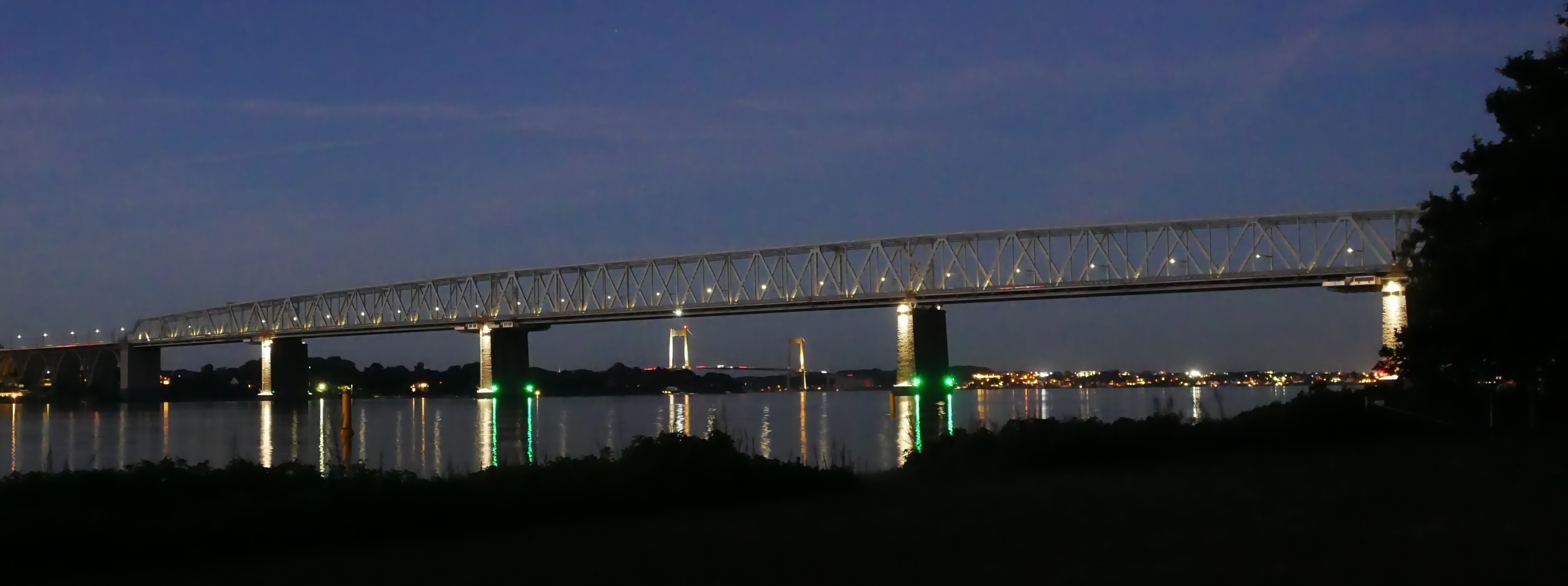
The old and the new bridge at night

The bridge requires constant maintenance. During the first decades after its construction, a group of workers would begin painting the entire steel structure from one end, proceed to the other and begin all over again once that was finished. Five to thirteen people work on the bridge at all times.

The bridge was closed to road traffic for most of 2018 and 2019 due to renovation work. Rail traffic continued almost uninterrupted, as the bridge is the only connection over Little Belt for trains.

== Tours ==
In 2015, guided 'bridgewalking' tours on top of the framework were introduced at the Little Belt Bridge. A standard tour will take two hours and is offered among high security measures.

== See also ==
- New Little Belt Bridge
