= Farø Bridges =

Farø South Bridge
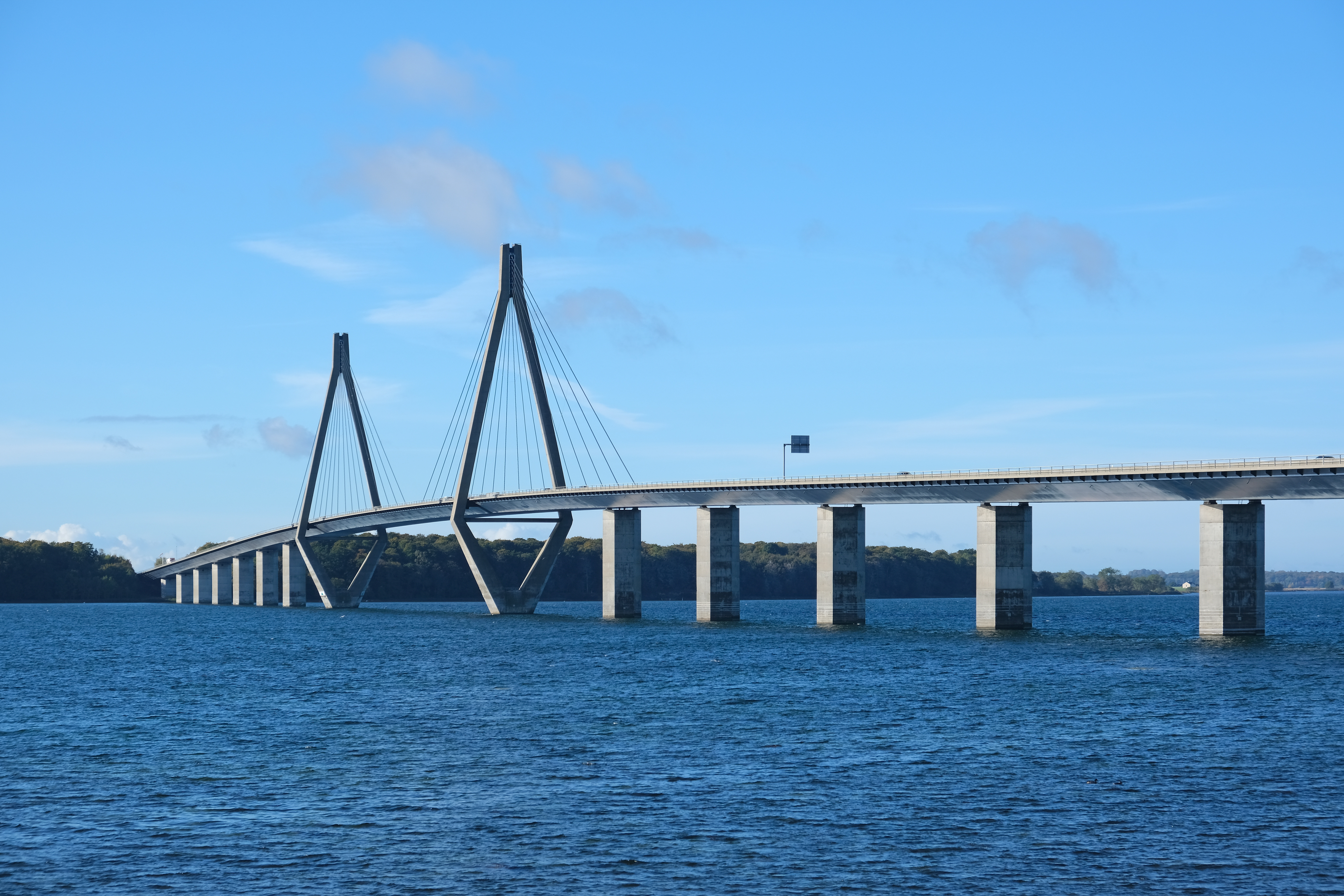
- Farø south bridge to Falster
- Coordinates: 54°57′03″N 11°59′14″E
- Carries: Road bridges that connect the islands of Falster and Zealand
- Crosses: Storstrømmen between Falster and Farø

Characteristics
- Design: cable-stayed bridge
- Total length: 1,726 metres (5,663 ft)
- Height: 26 metres (85 ft)
- Longest span: 290 metres (951 ft)

History
- Constructed by: Campenon Bernard; Højgaard & Schultz; Kampax; Monberg & Thorsen; Polensky & Zöllner
- Opened: 4 June 1985

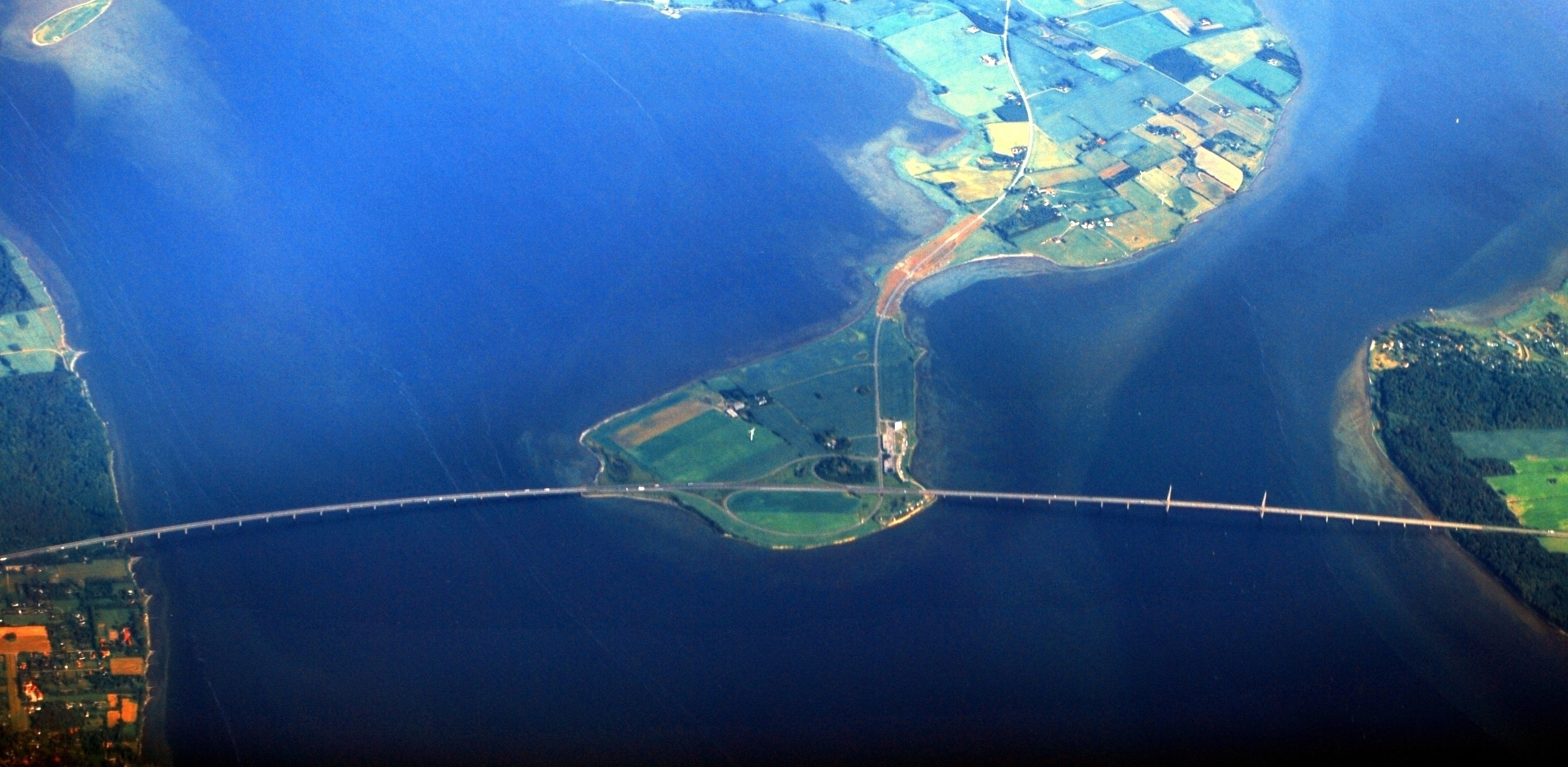
The Farø Bridges from above: Zealand (north) to the left, Falster to the right and Bogø at the top

Farø North Bridge
- Coordinates: 54°57′03″N 11°59′14″E
- Carries: Road bridges that connect the islands of Falster and Zealand
- Crosses: Kalvø Strøm between Farø and Zealand

Characteristics
- Design: Beam bridge
- Total length: 1,596 metres (5,236 ft)
- Height: 20 metres (66 ft)
- Longest span: 40 metres (131 ft)

History
- Opened: 4 June 1985

The Farø Bridges (Danish: Farøbroerne, pronounced [ˈfɑːʁœˌpʁoˀɐnə]) are two road bridges that connect the islands of Falster and Zealand in Denmark by way of the small island of Farø which is approximately mid-way across the Storstrømmen sound. A smaller bridge from Farø provides access to Bogø and thence to the island of Møn.

== History ==
The Farø Bridges were opened by Queen Margrethe II on 4 June 1985. They were built because of the increasing congestion problems on the old Storstrøm Bridge from 1937.

== Design ==
The high (south) bridge crosses Storstrømmen between Falster and Farø. It is a cable-stayed bridge. The bridge is 1,726 metres long, the longest span is 290 metres, and the maximum clearance to the sea is 26 metres strung up on 95.14 meters high suspension towers, which was finished in 1984. It was one of the first cable-stayed bridges in Scandinavia (the first was the Strömsund Bridge). The two towers supporting the span are of 'diamond' shape construction, rising from a single point to either side of the roadway, then combining to one point above the centre of the bridge. There is only one row of suspension cables, along the centre of the roadway.

The low (north) bridge crosses Kalvø Strøm between Farø and Zealand. It is a beam bridge. The bridge is 1,596 metres long, the longest span is 40 metres, and the maximum clearance to the sea is 20 metres.

The construction was undertaken by a consortium of Campenon Bernard, Højgaard & Schultz, Kampax, Monberg & Thorsen and Polensky & Zöllner.

== Routes ==
The Bridges carry the combined E47 route to Lolland and E55 route to Falster, from Copenhagen and Helsingør, both of which continue to mainland Europe by ferry. A further crossing from Lolland, the Fehmarn Belt Fixed Link may carry traffic to Germany, replacing the ferry.

== See also ==
- List of bridges in Denmark
- List of bridges in Denmark by length
- Storstrøm Bridge
- Masnedsund Bridge
