= Storstrøm Bridge =

Storstrøm Bridge Storstrømsbroen
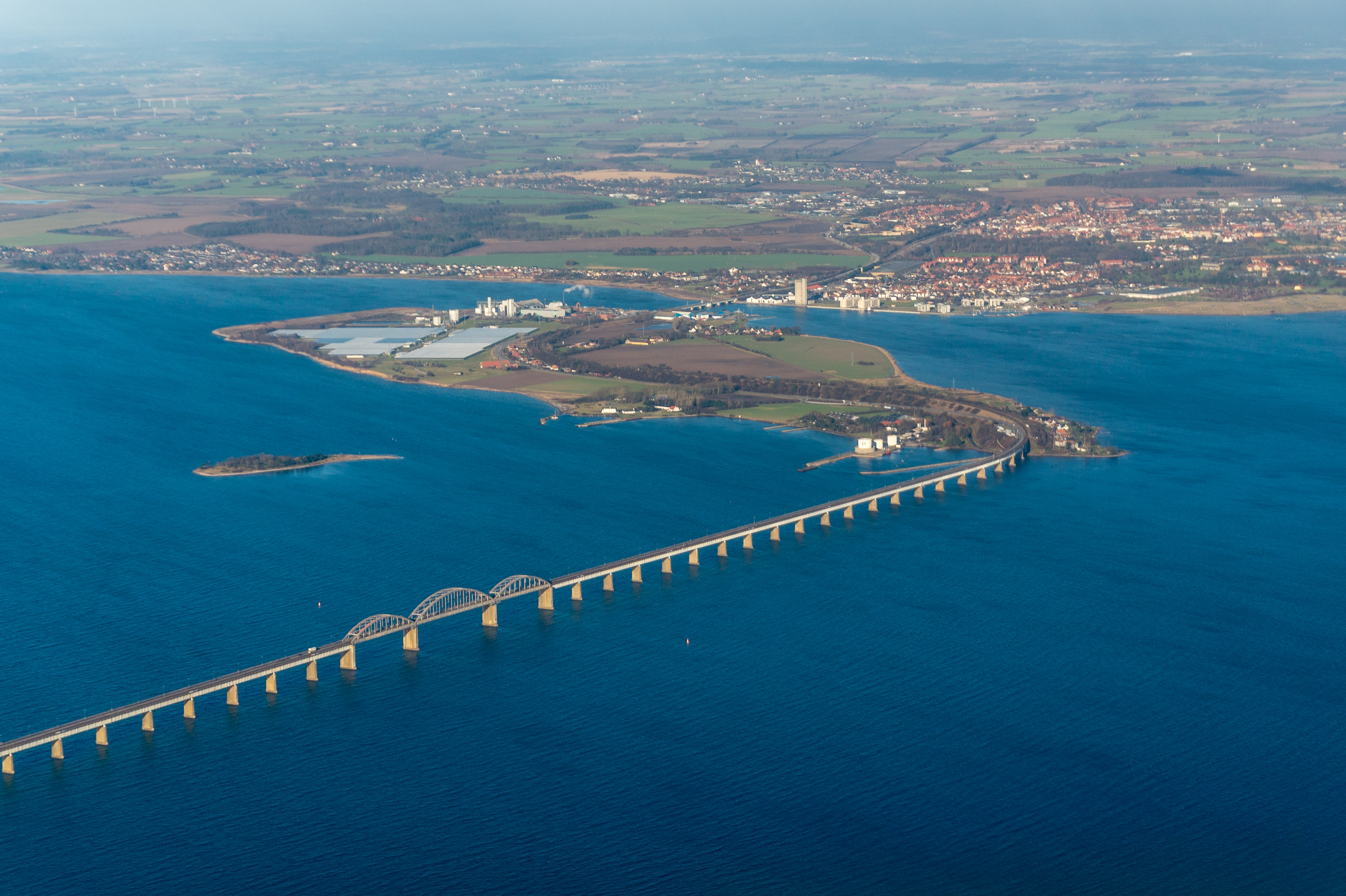
- Aerial view of Storstrøm Bridge (2015).
- Coordinates: 54°57′58″N 11°53′05″E
- Carries: Pedestrians; Bicycles; Motor vehicles; Trains
- Crosses: Storstrømmen

Characteristics
- Design: Tied-arch bridge
- Total length: 3,199.0 metres (1.988 mi)
- Width: 9.0 metres (30 ft)
- Longest span: 136.0 metres (446 ft)
- Piers in water: 49
- Clearance below: 26.0 metres (85 ft)
- No. of lanes: 2

Rail characteristics
- No. of tracks: 1
- Track gauge: 1,435 mm (4 ft 8 1/2 in)
- Electrified: No

History
- Designer: Anker Engelund
- Constructed by: Dorman, Long & Co.
- Construction start: 1933
- Construction end: 1937
- Construction cost: DKK 28.5 million
- Opened: 26 September 1937

Location
- Interactive map of Storstrøm Bridge

The Storstrøm Bridge (Danish: Storstrømsbroen, pronounced [ˈstoɐ̯stʁɶmsˌpʁoˀn̩]) is a road and railway arch bridge that crosses Storstrømmen between the islands of Falster and Masnedø in Denmark.

Together with Masnedsund Bridge it connects Falster and Zealand (Sjælland). It was the main road connection between the islands until the Farø Bridges were opened in 1985. It is still part of the railway connection between the islands of Lolland, Falster, and Zealand. It is on the rail line between Copenhagen and Hamburg, Germany.

== History ==
The bridge was designed by the bridge department at the Danish State Railways (DSB), headed by Anker Engelund and with the assistance of Danish company Christiani & Nielsen. The initial design proposal described a bridge with double-tracked railway, three steel-arch main spans, and concrete deck arch approach spans.

In the autumn of 1932, the British company Dorman, Long & Co. submitted a tender to build the Storstrøm Bridge as a steel bridge. As the submitted tender was not entirely acceptable, the DSB prepared a new project proposal which was granted to Dorman, Long & Co. without a public tender. The contract for the work was signed on 13 May 1933, with the steel superstructure to be constructed by Dorman, Long & Co., while the substructure and earthworks were assigned to Christiani & Nielsen as subcontractor. Guy Anson Maunsell was appointed as managing director of the consortium.

The Storstrøm Bridge was opened by King Christian X on 26 September 1937; the ceremony was attended by more than 40,000 people. The total cost of the Storstrøm Bridge amounted to DKK 28.5 million, or approximately DKK 41.0 million if also counting the Masnedsund Bridge and associated road and rail construction work.

=== Damage concerns ===
On 18 October 2011, Banedanmark announced the immediate cancellation of rail traffic across the bridge after a crack in one of the spans was discovered. Further investigation revealed a total of 11 cracks between 17 and 55 cm in length. One of the two road lanes was also partially closed while repairs were being made and fell. The bridge reopened to light rail traffic on 21 November 2011, and to regular rail traffic on 23 January 2012.

== Structure ==
The Storstrøm Bridge is 3,199 metres long and 9 metres wide. The three tied-arch main spans have lengths of 103.9 m, 137.8 m and 103.9 m, respectively. The central span has a clearance below of 26.0 metres (85 ft), tapering off to 25.2 metres (83 ft) in the two others. The inter-arch bracing is built as a double Warren truss.

The bridge has a total of 50 spans. The approach span configuration is somewhat unusual, with piers spaced alternately 57.8 m and 62.2 m apart and suspended spans placed in the longer spans.

The road deck is 5.6 metres (18 ft) wide.

The bridge has 49 piers of different heights, extending to a maximum water depth of 13.8 metres. Each pier rests upon concrete foundations cast on the excavated bed of the sea, inside a cofferdam. Some piers could be excavated and cast with the cofferdam empty of water, where the soil was sufficiently waterproof, but others had to be excavated and cast underwater. Steel sheet piles were driven into the bed around the cofferdam. The foundations were continued upwards to a level 3 metres below the water surface.

The section of pier from 3 metres below water level to 3 metres above was made from pre-cast and granite clad concrete shells. These were set into position and then filled with concrete. The remainder of the height of each pier was created using sliding steel forms. The upper sections of the piers are hollow. Piers full height extends to a maximum of 38 metres.

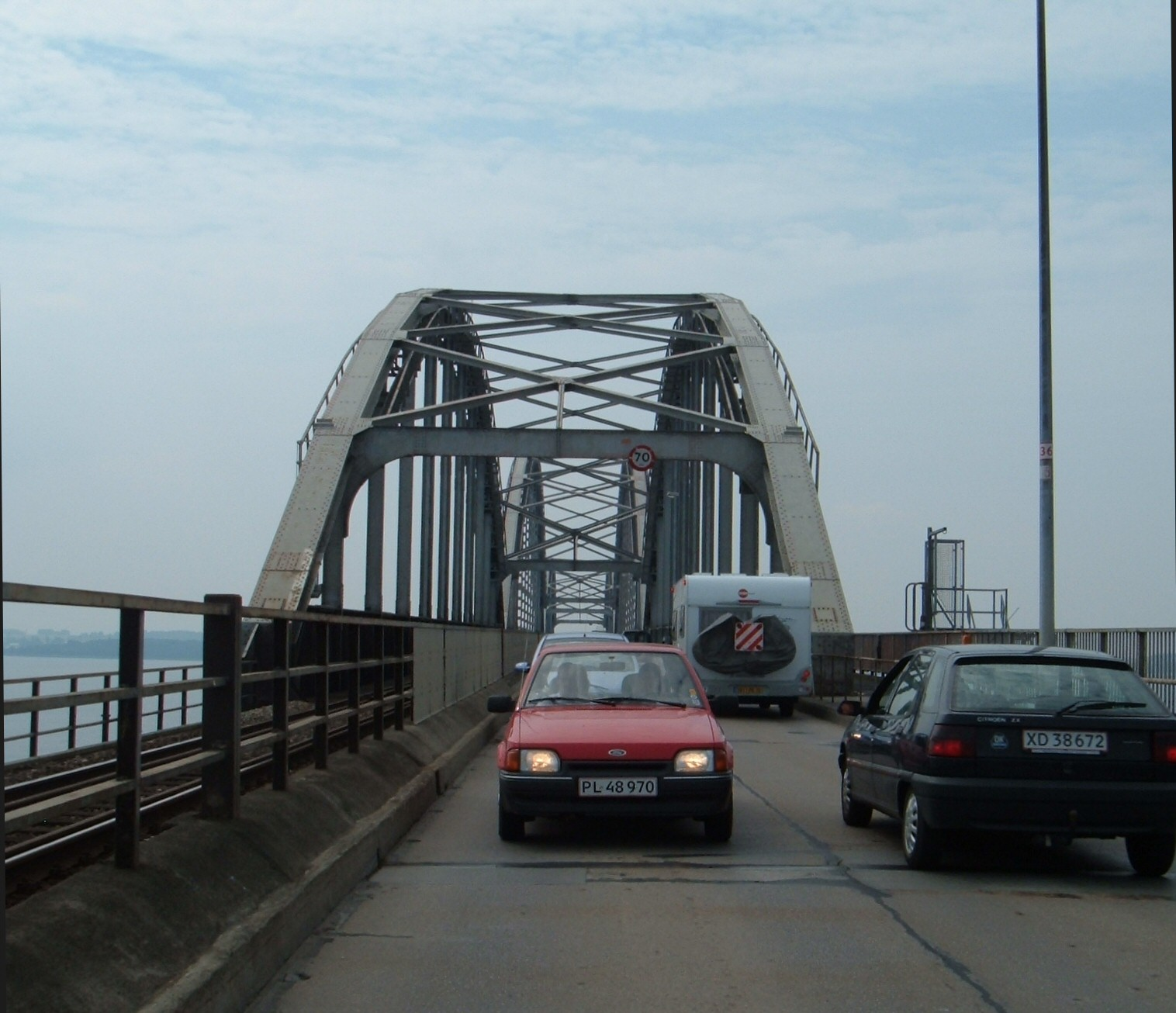
Bridge deck showing two narrow road lanes (without centre line) and one rail (without overhead wire)

== Future ==
As part of the planned Fehmarn Belt Fixed Link project, the railway from Ringsted to Rødbyhavn will be electrified, and between Vordingborg and Rødbyhavn also converted from single track to double track. Initial plans left the Storstrøm Bridge as an exception to the double-track conversion, but the expected increase in traffic in combination with the discovery of the poor condition of the bridge resulted in the decision to replace the Storstrøm Bridge entirely.

=== Replacement ===
As the bridge was found to be in poor condition in 2011, Banedanmark was tasked with investigating different long-term solutions. Their recommendation was to build a new bridge, and in August 2012, the Danish government proposed allocation of funds for the construction of a new bridge. Parliamentary agreement to build a replacement for the Storstrøm bridge was reached on 21 March 2013, and the construction act (Danish: anlægslov) was passed on 26 May 2015. The new bridge is commissioned by Vejdirektoratet and preliminary designed by Danish companies COWI, Dissing+Weitling and Hasløv & Kjærsgaard. In October 2017, it was announced that a joint venture of the Italian companies Itinera, Condotte and Grandi Lavori Fincosit had been selected to build the bridge with the design of Studio de Miranda Associati.

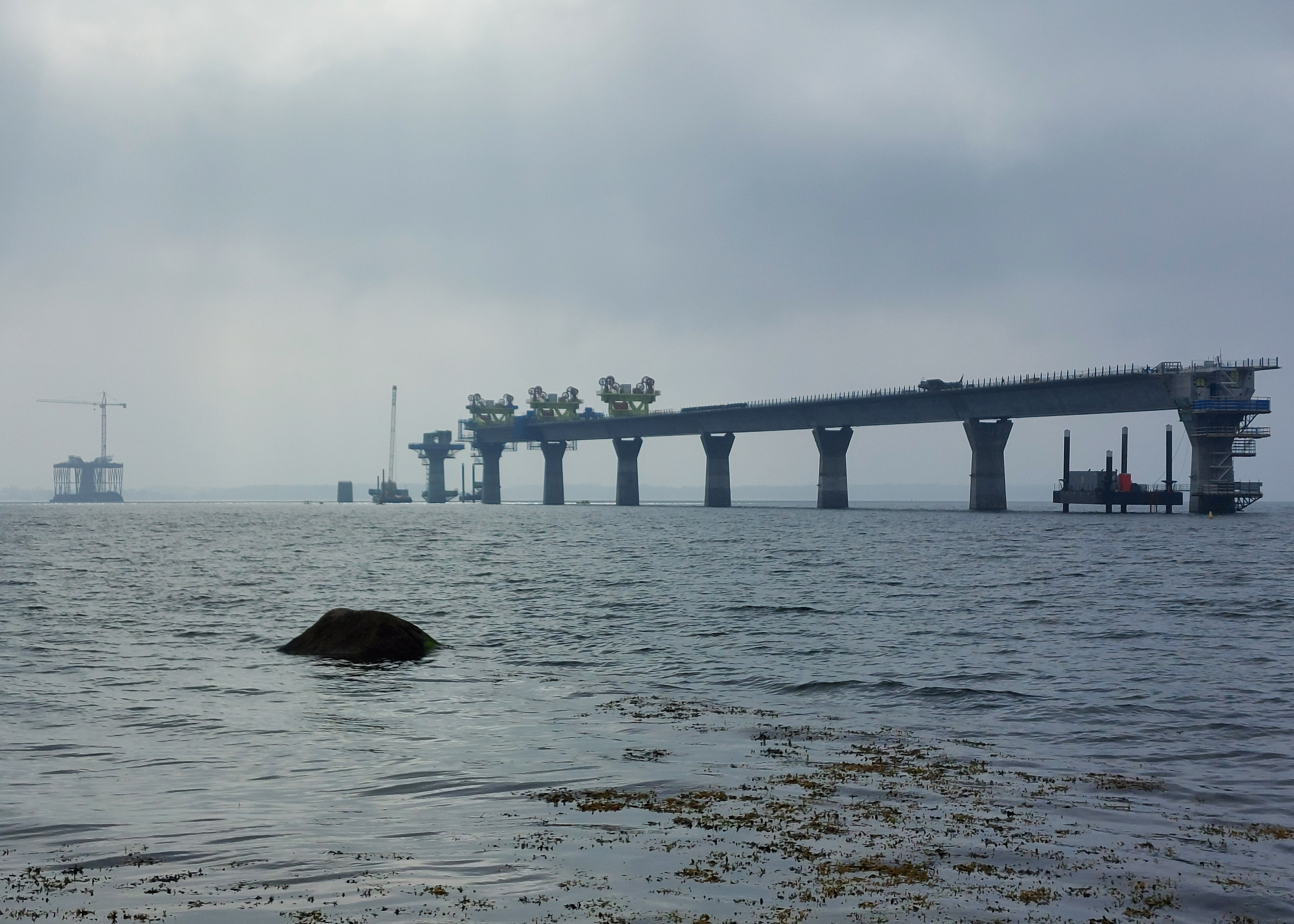
The new bridge under construction

The new bridge will be a single-pylon cable-stayed bridge with an electrified double-tracked railway allowing speeds of 200 km/h (120 mph), two road lanes allowing 80 km/h (50 mph) and a foot and bicycle path. It was scheduled to open to road traffic in 2022, and to rail traffic in 2023 however this was delayed due to the coronavirus pandemic. The revised opening for road traffic is now the middle of 2024, and for rail traffic in 2026. The Danish Road Directorate expects that the bridge will be open for cars in 2025 and for trains in early 2027. The construction budget for the new bridge is about DKK 2.1 billion, out of a total project budget of approx. DKK 4.1 billion. The ground breaking ceremony of the new bridge took place on 27 September 2018.

The current Storstrøm Bridge is set to be demolished once the new bridge is completed.

By October 2023, 880 meters of bridge had been constructed.

The replacement bridge, named after Dronning Margrethe II, opened to traffic on March 23, 2026, with a formal decommissioning ceremony for the previous road crossing completed on June 6-7. The rail service is expected to move onto the new bridge in 2027.

== Cultural references ==
In 1950, Carl Th. Dreyer, one of Denmark's most famous filmmakers, normally known for his drama productions, made a short documentary about the bridge.

== See also ==
- List of bridges in Denmark

== Bibliography ==
- Andersen, R. (15 September 1937). "Storstrømsbroen". Ingeniør- og Bygningsvæsen (in Danish). Vol. 32, no. 18. pp. 143–155.
- Flensborg, H. (2 October 1937). "Storstrømsbroen med tilsluttende anlæg". Ingeniøren (in Danish). Vol. 46, no. 59. pp. 189–202.
