= Alssund Bridge =

Coordinates: 54.9222°N 9.7668°E

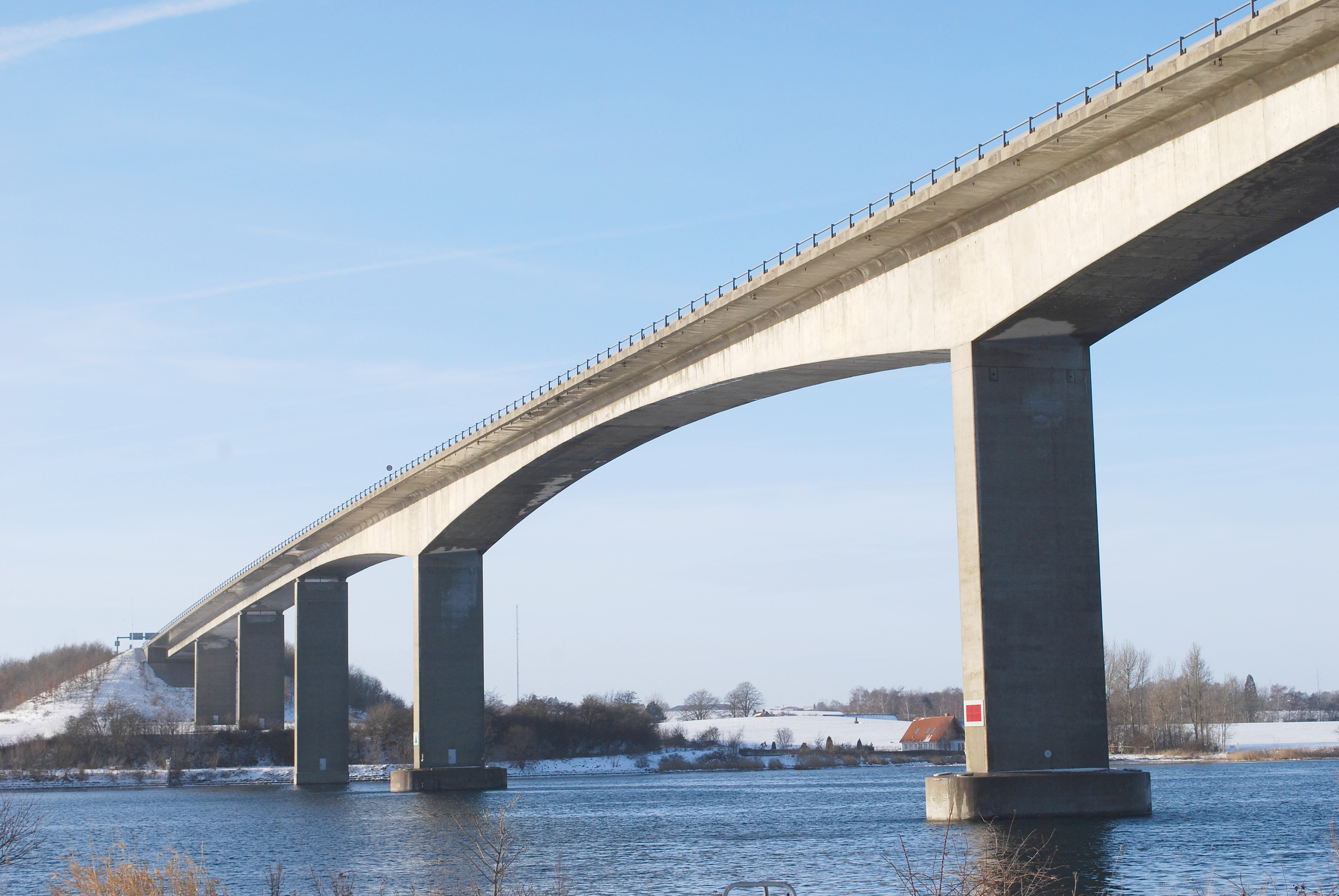
The Alssund Bridge

The Alssund Bridge (Danish: Alssundbroen) is a 662-metre-long (2,172 ft) girder bridge that carries Highway 8 across the Alssund north of Sønderborg, Denmark. Constructed between 1978 and 1981, it was officially opened on 19 October 1981 by Queen Ingrid.
