= Storstrømmen =

Strait in Denmark

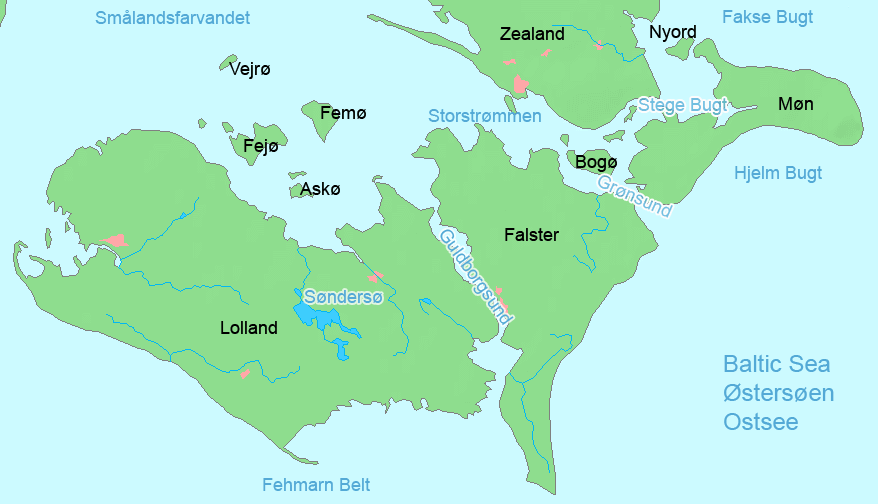
- Storstrømmen between Falster and Zealand

- Location within Denmark
- Coordinates: 54°58′N 11°55′E
- Type: strait
- Basin countries: Denmark
- Max. length: 10 km (6 mi)
- Max. depth: 36 m (118 ft)

Storstrømmen (Danish pronunciation: [ˈstoɐ̯ˌstʁɶmˀm̩]; lit. The Great Stream) is a strait in Denmark separating the island Falster from the island Zealand.

== Geography ==
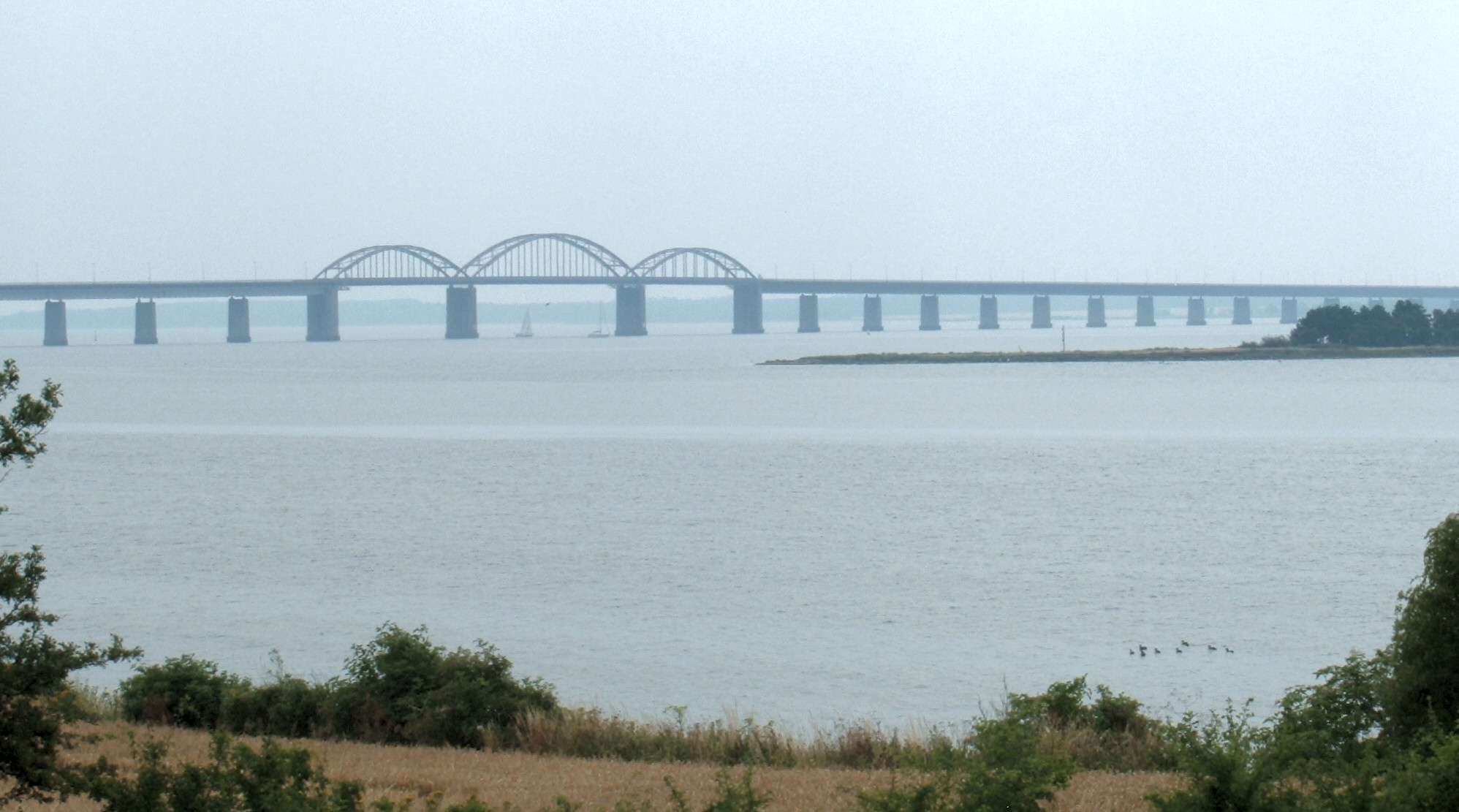
Storstrøm Bridge

Its maximum depth is approximately 36 metres (118 ft) and the length is around 10 kilometres (6.2 mi). Smålandsfarvandet sound is situated to the west and Grønsund lies to the east. Storstrøm Bridge crosses Storstrømmen between the islands of Falster and Masnedø. The southernmost of the Farø Bridges crosses Storstrømmen between Falster and Farø.

== See also ==
- Storstrøm County
- Geography of Denmark
