= Alssund =

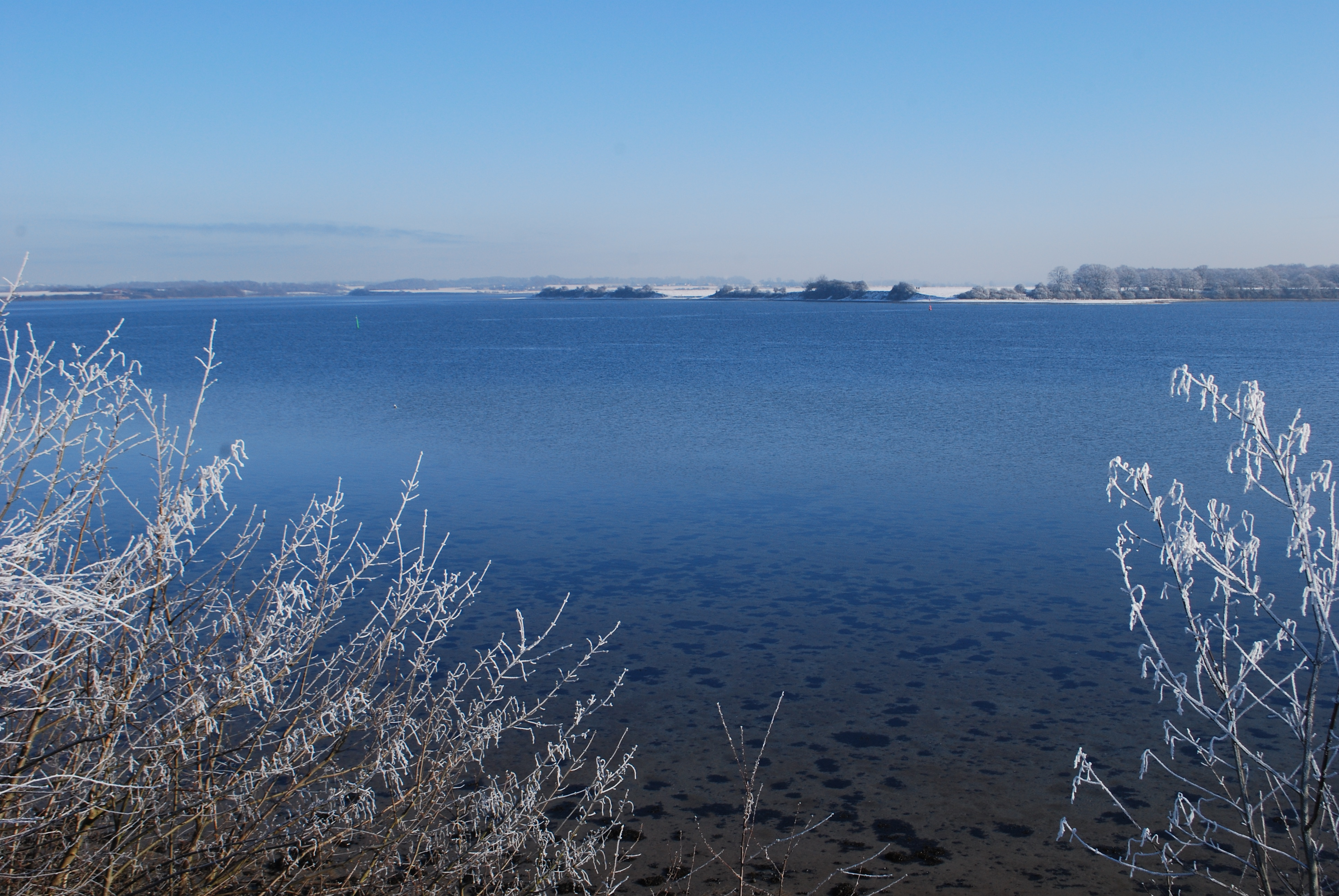
- Alssund between Jutland (W) and Als (E)

- Location within Denmark Location within Region of Southern Denmark
- Coordinates: 54.936°N 9.759°E
- Type: strait
- Basin countries: Denmark

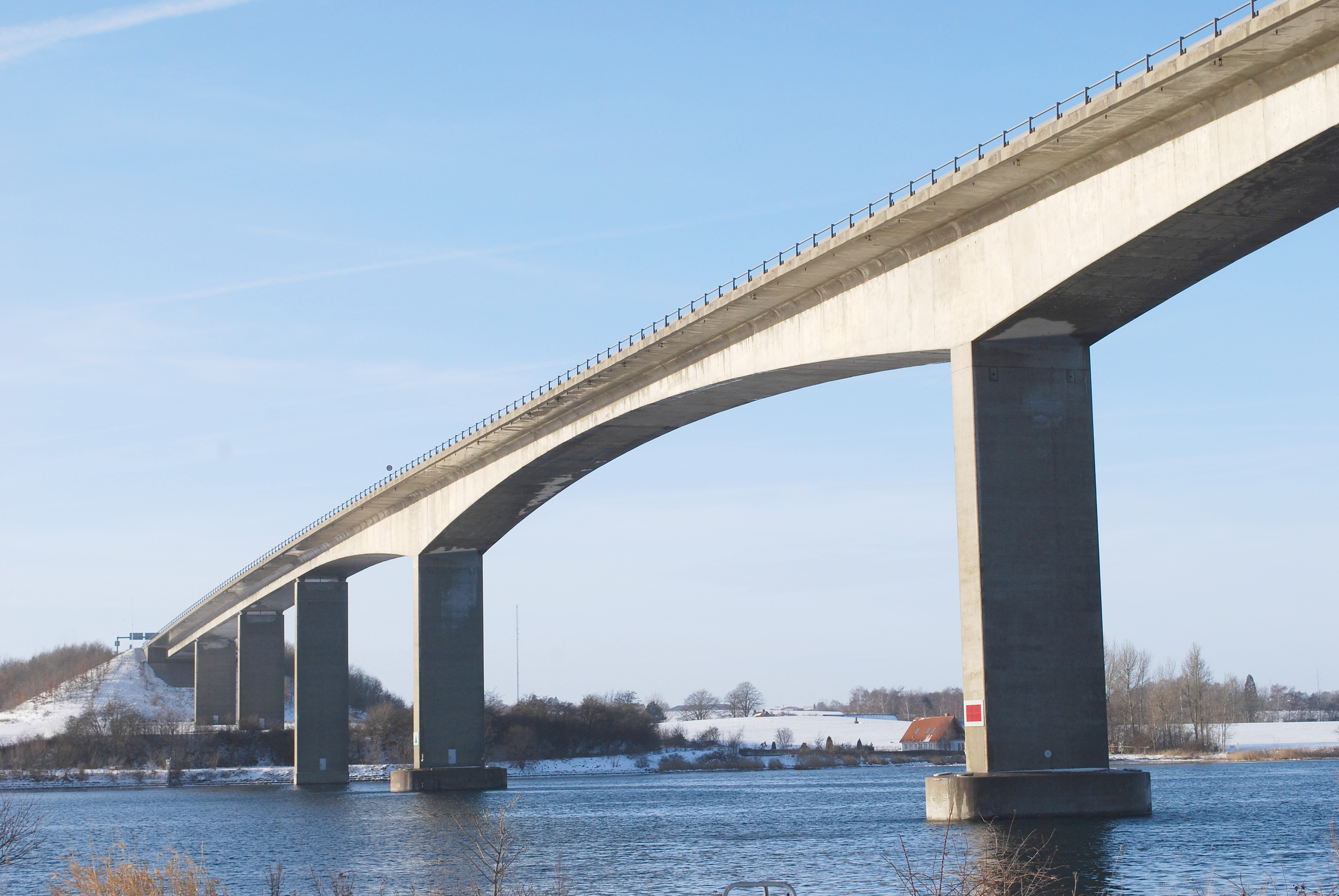
The new bridge across the strait

The Alssund is the narrow strait between Als island and the mainland of Jutland, in Denmark.

== See also ==
- Geography of Denmark
