= Tingsted Church =

Coordinates: 54°48′49″N 11°54′31″E

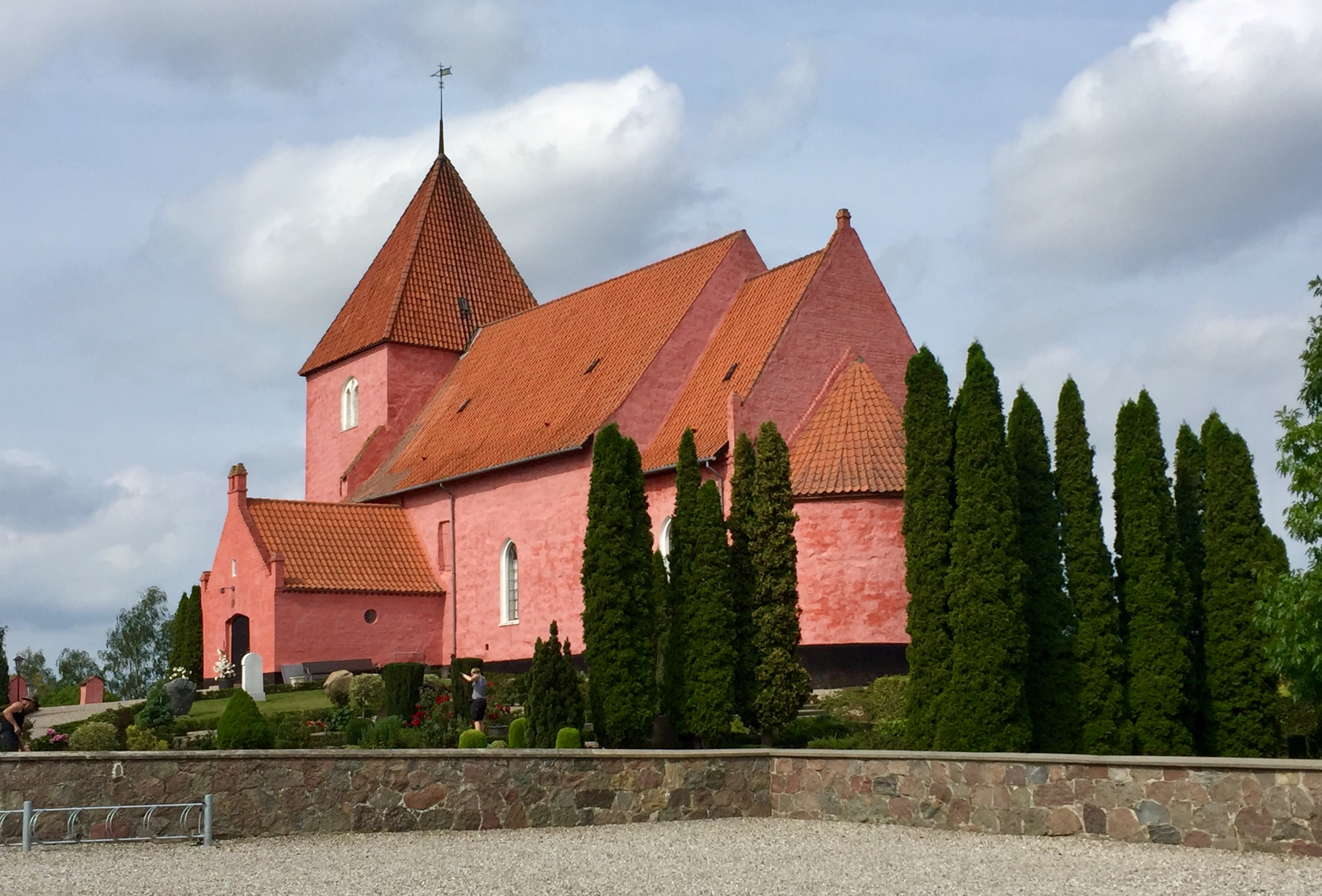
- Tingsted Church
- Location: Tingsted, Falster
- Country: Denmark
- Denomination: Church of Denmark

History
- Dedication: Saint Peter

Architecture
- Architectural type: Romanesque architecture, Gothic architecture
- Completed: ca. 1200

Administration
- Diocese: Diocese of Lolland–Falster
- Deanery: Falster Provsti
- Parish: Tingsted Sogn

Tingsted Church, located on high ground in the village of Tingsted on the Danish island of Falster, dates from c. 1200. Built in the Romanesque style, it is best known for its frescos from the end of the 15th century.

== History ==
At an early stage, the pink-plastered church was dedicated to St Peter. As the name Tingsted implies, the place was originally associated with early lawmaking in the area. In 1329, King Christopher II concluded an agreement with Marsk Ludvig Eberstein, head of the armed forces, after his surrender at Hammershus and in 1329 made peace with Count Johann of Holstein. In 1511, Falster's landsting (regional council) was held in the churchyard and the following year King Hans presided over a dispute between his vassal and the bishop. Jacob Christian Lindberg, who translated the Bible into Danish and, together with Grundtvig played an active part in religious reforms, was named parish pastor in January 1844.

== Architecture and fittings ==
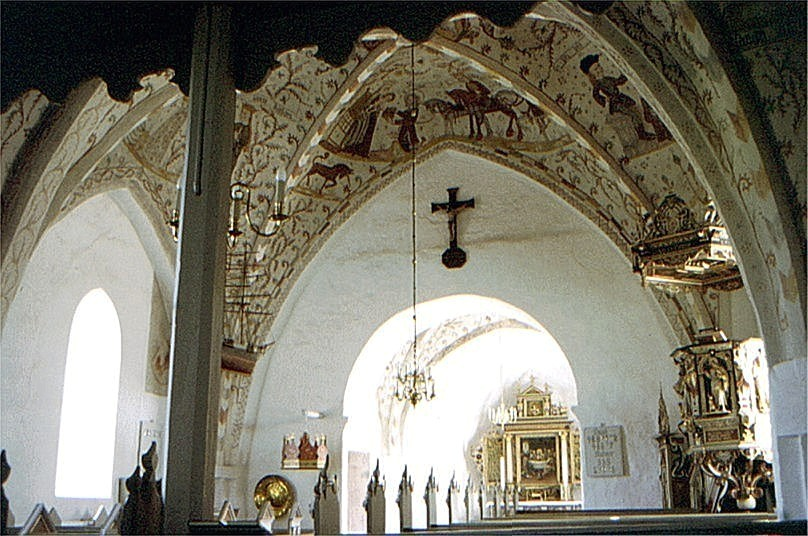
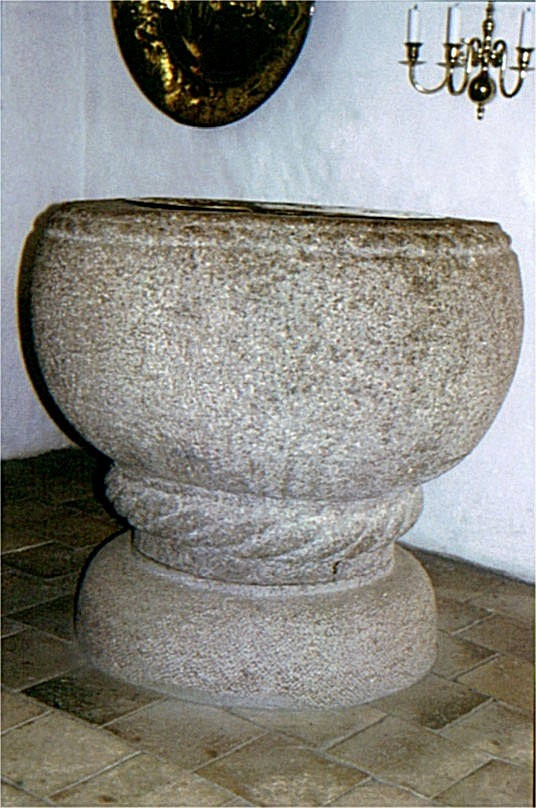
Left: the nave. Right: the font.

Built of local fieldstone with limestone framing around the windows and doors, the church initially consisted of the nave, chancel and a half-domed apse. Traces of the original rounded windows highly positioned in the nave and apse can still be seen. Around 1500, the Late Gothic tower and porch were added and the flat ceiling in the nave was replaced by cross-vaulting. The windows were later adapted to the positioning of the vaults. The tower probably had stepped gables until it received the pyramid-shaped spire. It is thought the relatively steep roof above the nave resulted from the need to provide room for the top of the arches used for the vaulting.

The panel on the 17th-century altar is the work of Antonius Clement, Queen Sophia's court painter. Its three niches have female figures representing Faith, Hope and Charity and are bordered by slim figures representing the cardinal virtues: Temperance, Justice, Prudence and Fortitude. The elaborately worked Renaissance altarpiece (1616) contains a painting of the Last Supper. The carved baroque pulpit (1633) by Jørgen Ringnis with paintings by Anthonius Clement bears similarities to the one in Kippinge Church. The Romanesque font has a wide, rounded bowl.

== Frescos ==
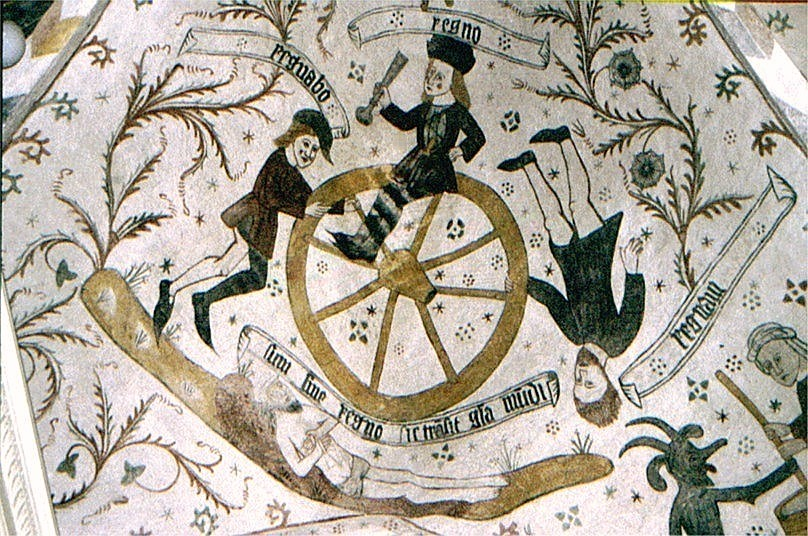
Fresco of the wheel of life (c. 1500)

The frescos in the chancel and the nave from the late 15th century are the work of the Elmelunde Master and his workshop. Rediscovered under the whitewash in 1877, they depict the baptism of Jesus, the suicide of Judas, the rich man and the poor man together with the Fall and the Expulsion. The rich man, kneeling before Christ, wears a long-tailed hood, an article of clothing reserved for the more affluent of the time.

There are also two non-Biblical frescos, one of the wheel of life, the other depicting the churning of butter. The captions around the wheel of life are typical of the Elmelund Master. Three figures of kings are placed around a cartwheel. On the left, the king who is rising says "regnabo" (I will rule), the one at the top, dressed in fine clothes and holding a fine glass of wine, announces "regno" (I rule), the one on the right, his bearded head hanging low, says "regnavi" (I have ruled) while the dead body of the king with folded hands below the wheel is accompanied by a banner stating "sum sine regno sic transit gloria mundi" (I am without a kingdom so transpires the glory of the world).

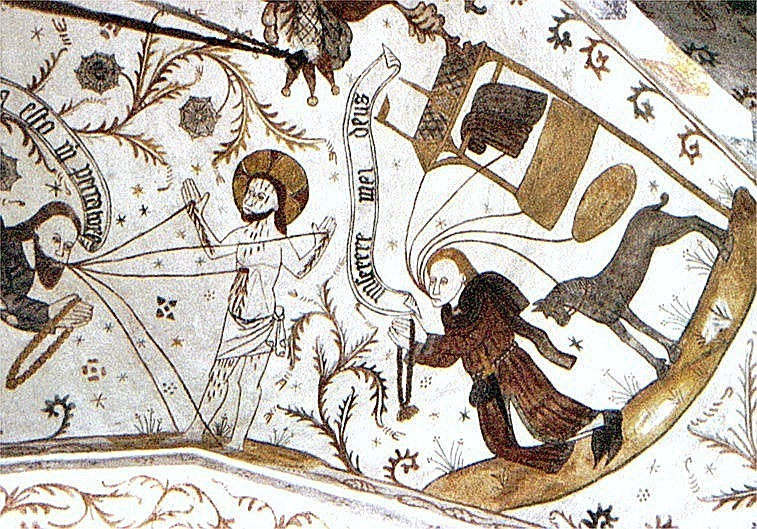
Fresco: the rich man and the poor man

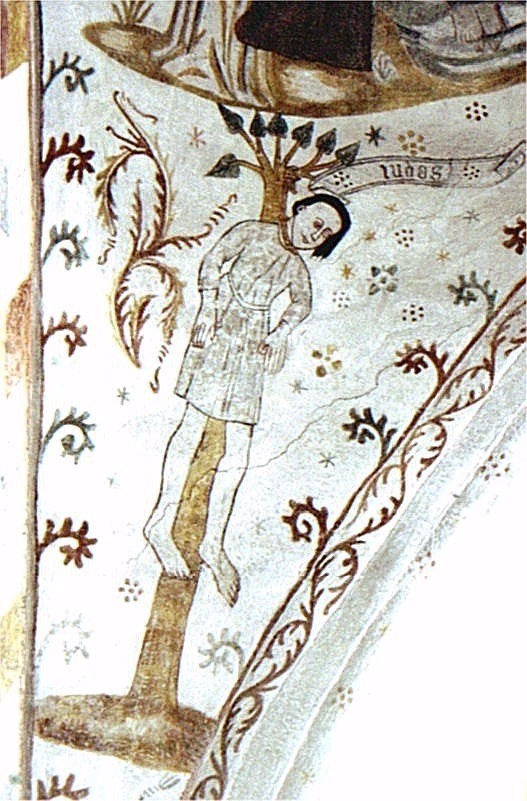
Fresco: Judas's death by suicide

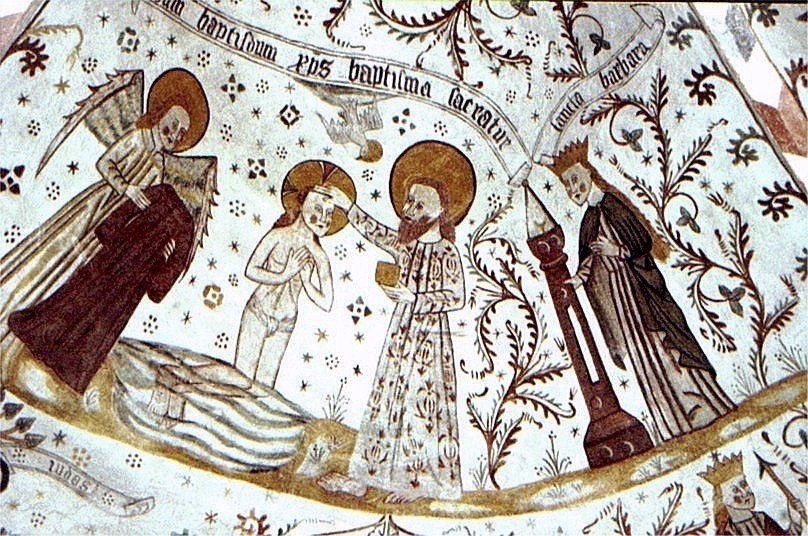
Fresco: Jesus's baptism

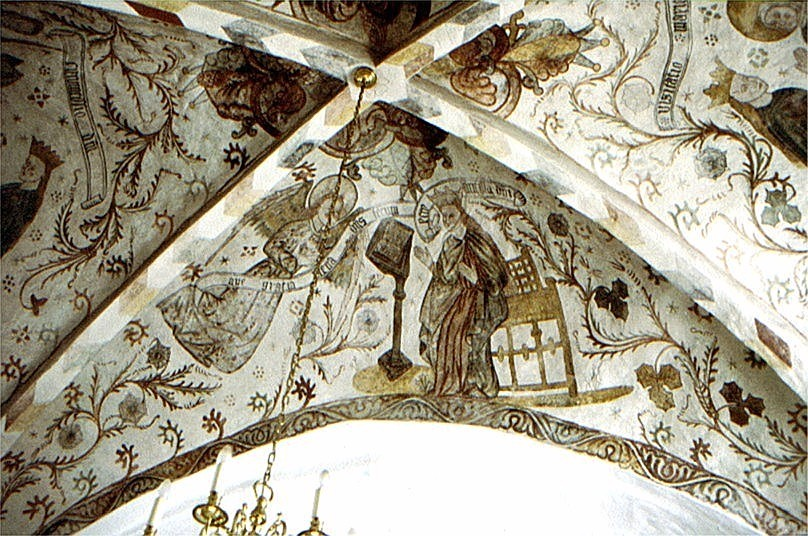
Fresco: the Annunciation
