= Danmarks Traktormuseum =

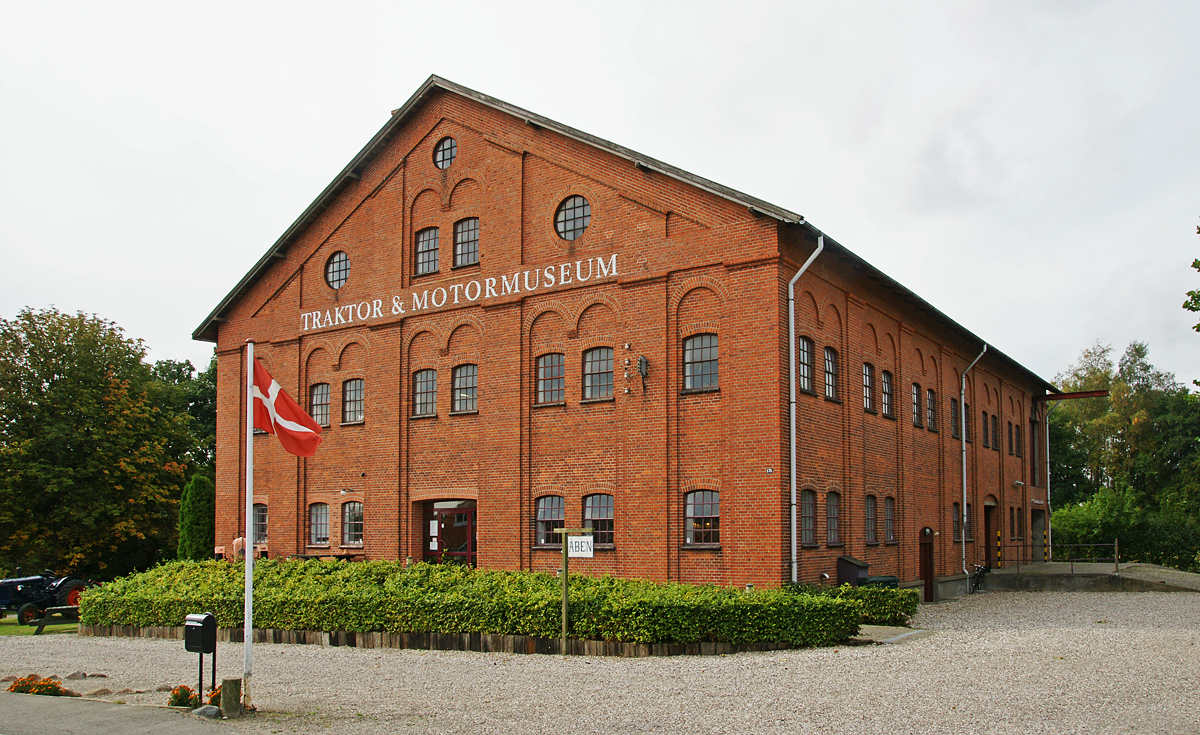

- Location within Falster
- Location: Norregade 17 B, 4863 Eskilstrup, Falster, Denmark
- Coordinates: 54°51′30″N 11°53′11″E
- Type: Tractor museum
- Owner: Government of Guldborgsund Municipality

Danmarks Traktormuseum ("Denmark's Tractor Museum"; formerly Lolland-Falster Tractor and Engine Museum) is located in Eskilstrup on the Danish island of Falster. The tractor and motor museum is housed in a brick warehouse dating from 1918. It contains tractors and engines built between 1880 and 1960 by Bukh, Ferguson, Fiat, Ford, and Volvo.

== History ==
The museum is owned by Guldborgsund Municipality. After the building sat vacant for some years, the municipality took it over in 1981 and in 1986 moved the Tractor and Engine Museum into it. The new museum was officially opened in 1988. The exhibition area covers about 2,000 square metres (22,000 sq ft) over four floors of the old warehouse building, the three wooden floors supported by 24 columns; and a nearby workshop building. The museum building itself was completed in 1919 as a cleaning station for seeds. It was the first building on Falster to make use of reinforced concrete.

== Collections ==
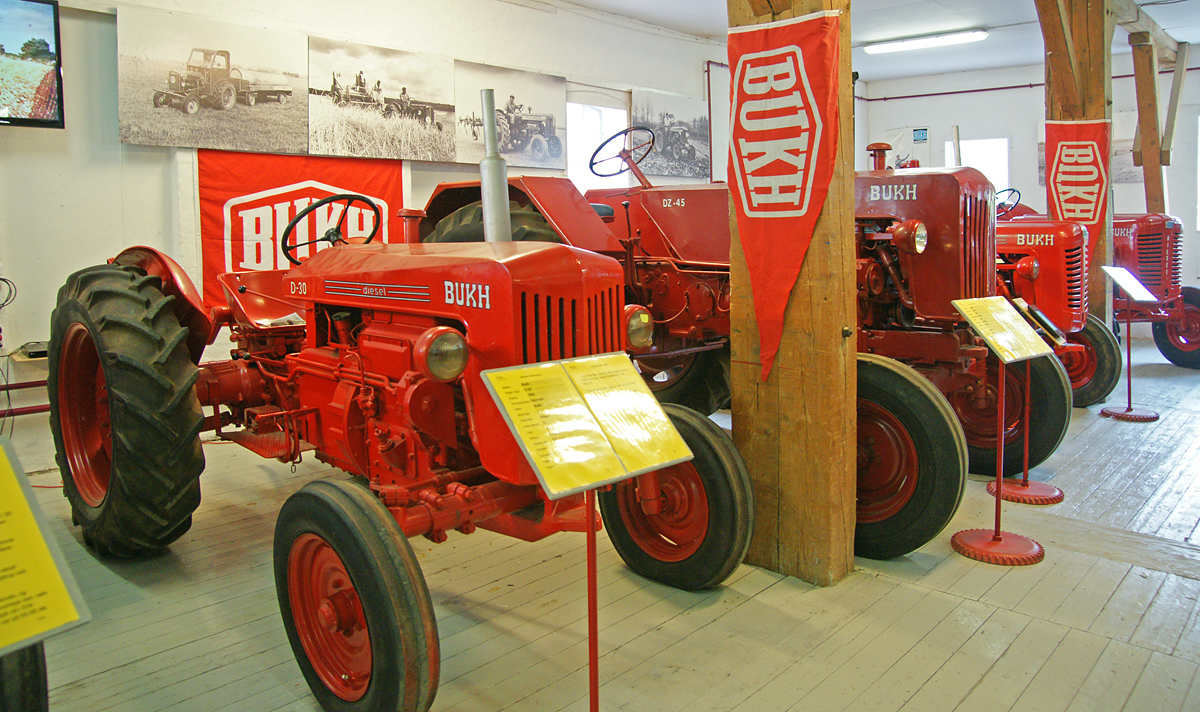
Bukh tracktors at the Danmarks Traktormuseum.

There are five major collections totalling around 100 tractors and a similar number of engines. The tractor displays include a collection of 38 tractors from the brothers Bent and Knud Nielsen, who were farmers in the area. There are over 200 tractors from the time of the tractor's invention and up until around 1970. There is an almost complete collection of the Danish Bukh tractors, including prototypes, special models and a comprehensive collection of photographs. In addition to the larger collections of Bolinder-Munktell, Volvo, International and Ferguson, there are also several individual rarities. A motor assembly displays almost 100 mainly stationary engines, such Bukh engines, a Holeby engine from 1898 and an International engine from 1925. An extensive library provides instructional and repair books and parts catalogs. A tool assembly showcases agriculture and motorized garden equipment. The Sigvardt collection includes components of Rasmus Sigvardt from nearby Orehoved who was a manufacturer of motors and motorized field and orchard sprayers. Aside from the tractors on display at the museum, there are about 85 tractors stored in three different farms.

== Features ==
The museum organizes an annual special exhibition. Past themes have includes "Rare tractors and tractor development" (2012), "Rare tractors" (2011), and "Swedish tractors" (2010) which was supplemented by tractors borrowed from a Swedish collector. The museum is open June to September from Tuesday to Sunday (10 am to 4 pm, weekends 10 am to 3 pm). In July and August it is also open on Mondays. The museum also has an area for children where they can play with toy tractors while their parents visit the museum.
