= Orehoved Lighthouse =

Orehoved Lighthouse Orehoved Bagfyr
- Location: Orehoved, Falster; Denmark
- Coordinates: 54.960119°N 11.851734°E

Tower
- Constructed: 1879 (first)
- Construction: masonry tower
- Height: 11 metres (36 ft)
- Shape: square prism and half cylinder tower with balcony and lantern
- Markings: white tower and lantern

Light
- First lit: 1895 (current); 1933 (raised one story)
- Focal height: 11 metres (36 ft)
- Range: 11 nmi (20 km; 13 mi) (white), 8 nmi (15 km; 9.2 mi) (red, green)
- Characteristic: Al Fl WRG 2s.
- Denmark no.: DFL-5376

Orehoved Lighthouse is a lighthouse in Orehoved on the north coast of Falster, Denmark. It was built in 1895 on the northwest corner of the quay, replacing an earlier light which had simply been placed on a mast at the end of the railway pier. A blue gas burner was installed in 1912. In 1933, a third storey was added to the tower, bringing it up to a height of 11 metres (36 ft).

== See also ==
- List of lighthouses and lightvessels in Denmark
