= Tingsted =

- Town
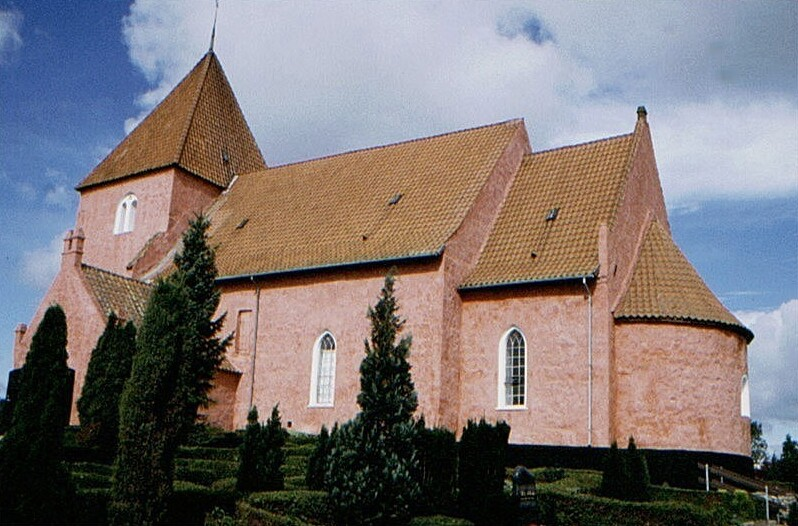
- Tingsted Church, Falster

- Location on Falster
- Coordinates: 54°48′48″N 11°54′22″E
- Country: Denmark
- Region: Zealand (Sjælland)
- Municipality: Guldborgsund

Population (2026)
  - Total: 226
- Time zone: UTC+1 (CET)
  - Summer (DST): UTC+2 (CEST)

Tingsted is a village 6 kilometres (3.7 mi) northeast of Nykøbing on the Danish island of Falster. Tingsted played an important role in early Danish history as a venue for lawmaking and diplomatic agreements. 1. January 2026 it had a population of 226.

== History ==
Tingsted is first mentioned in the Danish Census Book as Tingstathæ (c. 1250). Built in the Romanesque style, Tingsted Church dates from c. 1200. As the name Tingsted implies, the place was originally associated with early lawmaking in the area. In 1329, King Christopher II concluded an agreement with Marsk Ludvig Eberstein, head of the armed forces, after his surrender at Hammershus and in 1329 made peace with Count Johann of Holstein. In 1511, Falster's landsting (regional council) was held in the churchyard and the following year King Hans presided over a dispute between his vassal and the bishop.

The manor at Kirstinebjerg Gods was built in 1766 with bricks from Nykøbing Slot on a hunting estate sold by the Crown.

Tingsted had a station on the Falster Railway from Orehoved to Nykøbing Falster which opened in 1870. It was taken out of service and demolished in 1971.
