= Jørgen Balthasar Dalhoff =

Danish goldsmith and industrialist (1800–1890)

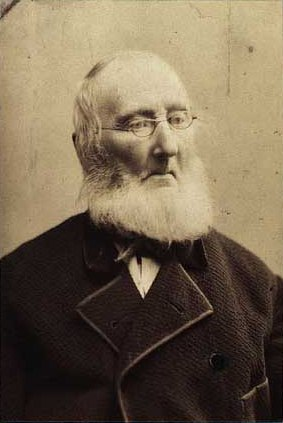
- Jørgen Dalhoff photographed by Budtz Müller
- Born: 11 November 1800; Ønslev, Denmark
- Died: 2 March 1890 (aged 89); Copenhagen, Denmark
- Occupation: Goldsmith

Jørgen Balthasar Dalhoff (11 November 1800 - 2 March 1890) was a Danish goldsmith and industrialist.

== Early life and education ==
Dalhoff was born on 11 November 1800 in Ønslev on Falster, the son of Peder Dalhoff (1757–1827) and Anna Margrethe Plesner (1766-1817). At age 15, he was sent to Copenhagen where he apprenticed as a goldsmith until 1820. He gained a reputation for being a skillful engraver and created several fine candlesticks for Christiansborg Palace in his brother Knud Plesner Dalhoff's (1794-1832) brazier workshop. He went on a three-year study trip abroad from 1824 to 1827, visiting Berlin, Vienna, Rome, Naples, and Paris. In Rome, he formed a friendship with Bertel Thorvaldsen of whom he created a bust.

He also enrolled at the Royal Danish Academy of Fine Arts where he studied under G. F. Hetsch.

== Career ==
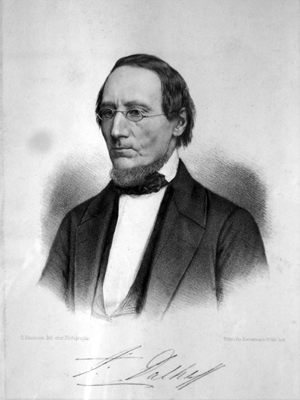
Jørgen Dalhoff

Back in Copenhagen, in 1829, he was by royal resolution licensed as a master goldsmith, with a right to work in all materials, and was in 1833 appointed as royal court goldsmith.

Dalhoff was also active as a bronze caster. His firstwork in this field was E. Freund's fountain Boy on Swann for Rosenborg Castle Gardens in 1837. Other commissions were the four colossal Bertel Thorvaldsen statues for Christiansborg Palace (Skt. Jørgens gård), the sculptures group for the roof of Thorvaldsens Museum, and the Jupiter relief for the facade of Christiansborg Palace.

After Christian VIII's death, Dalhoff increasingly engaged in a more industrialized production of products in galvanoplasty and German silver as well as lacquered trays and tinned iron pots.

He obtained several patents on technical inventions and installed a central heating system at the College of Advanced Technologies in 1859 .He visited many of the great exhibitions in Germany, Austria, France and England.

== Other activities ==
Dalhoff was a teacher at the Academy from 1827 to 1864. He instigated the foundation of Industriforenignen in 1838, was a board member until 1865, and appointed as honorary member in 1885. He was appointed as an honorary member of the Association of Craftsmen in Copenhagen in 1876.

Dalhoff wrote his memoirs in 1888. They were published posthumously by his son N. C. Dalhoff.
