= Eskilstrup Church =

Coordinates: 54°51′27″N 11°52′53″E

- Eskilstrup Kirke
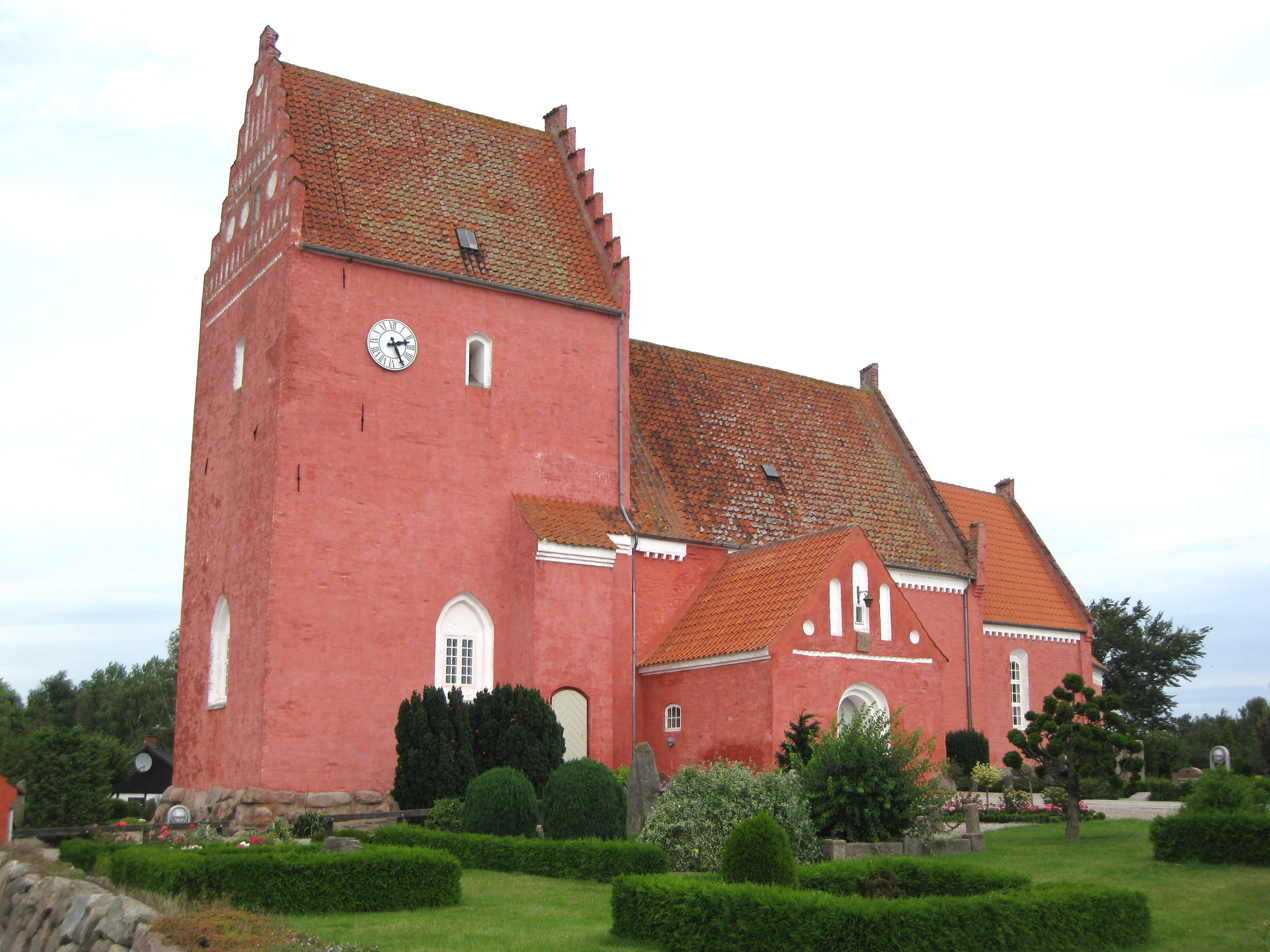
- Eskilstrup Church
- Location: Eskilstrup, Falster
- Country: Denmark
- Denomination: Church of Denmark

Architecture
- Style: Romanesque architecture
- Years built: ca. 1130

Administration
- Diocese: Diocese of Lolland–Falster
- Deanery: Falster Provsti
- Parish: Eskilstrup Sogn

Eskilstrup Church (Danish: Eskilstrup Kirke) is a church in Eskilstrup, Denmark. The church dates from the 12th century and was built in the Romanesque style. In accordance with a local tradition, it is painted red. It is best known for its frescos, said to be Denmark's oldest.

== History ==
At the beginning of the 16th century, the church was owned by the bishopric under the administration of its seat at Sørup on Lolland. In 1694, it was annexed to Ønslev Church, 3 km to the west. After the Reformation it came under the Crown until 1767 when it was sold into private ownership. It was, however, soon reacquired by the State until 1852 when it was sold to the farmers of the parish. It gained full independence in 1933.

== Architecture ==
The church consists of a Late Romanesque apse, chancel and nave and a Gothic tower and porch, all built of brick. Pilaster strips decorate the corners of the nave and chancel. The apse and chancel have a rounded foundation base. There is a three-sided wall at the east end of the apse while there are round-arched windows in the side walls. The toothed cornice is decorated a saw-toothed trimming which runs along pilasters to the chancel gable. The nave walls are similarly decorated with cornices and pilasters. The chancel windows resemble those of the apse but they have been extended downwards.

== Interior and fittings ==
The apse's original vaulting develops from a polygonal base to a quarter dome terminating in the rounded apse arch. During the Gothic period, the chancel ceiling was cross-vaulted while the chancel arch was widened and given a pointed top. The nave has retained a flat ceiling. The red brick tower on a fieldstone base has flat arched windows to the south and west. It opens into the nave through a large irregular arch.

The Renaissance altarpiece (1617) is rather a rough piece of rural craftmanship. The large cornice is borne by two Ionic columns. The central painting by Stefan Viggo Pedersen (1926) depicts the announcement of Jesus' birth to the shepherds. Designed by Jørgen Ringnis, the intricately carved pulpit (1639) is in the Auricular style. With the four Evangelists in shell-framed panels, it closely resembles the pulpit in Lolland's Ryde Church. The pilasters have however been renewed during rebuilding work in 1805 although the cherub heads and ornamental decorations have been retained. The hexagonal canopy bears a dove at the top and angels' heads on the corners. The pulpit, staircase and canope are varnished but not coloured.

== Frescos ==
In 1893, frescos were discovered in the apse and chancel, dating to the second half of the 13th century. The chancel fresco, restored by E. Lind in 1942, includes scenes from Christ's childhood including the Flight to Egypt depicting Joseph, Mary and the ass. They are said to be among the oldest in the region.
