= Øster Kippinge =

- Town
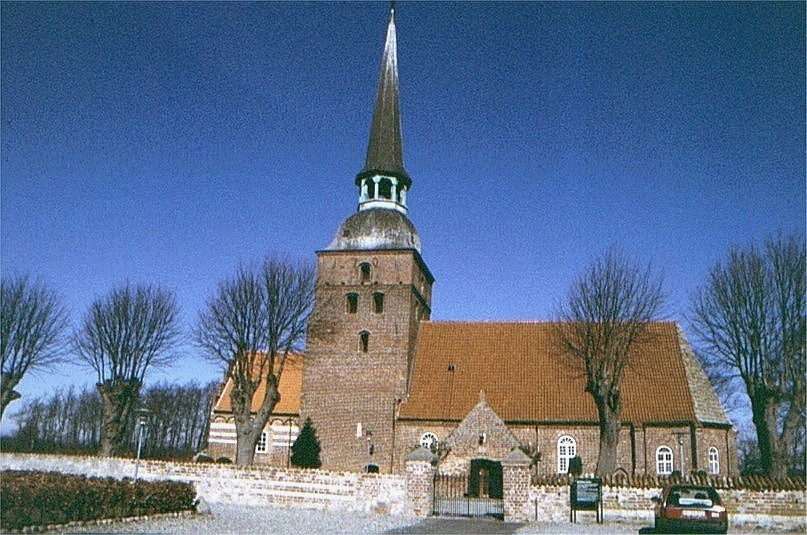
- Kippinge Church, Falster

- Location on Falster
- Coordinates: 54°53′52″N 11°47′57″E
- Country: Denmark
- Region: Zealand (Sjælland)
- Municipality: Guldborgsund

Population (2026)
  - Total: 261
- Time zone: UTC+1 (CET)
  - Summer (DST): UTC+2 (CEST)

Øster Kippinge is a village 6 kilometres (3.7 mi) west of Nørre Alslev on the Danish island of Falster. As of 2026, it has a population of 261.

== History ==
The spring near Kippinge Church to the northwest of the village has attracted pilgrims for centuries, possibly even before the church was built in the Middle Ages. Known as Sankt Søren's spring, it is probably the second most famous in Denmark. Pilgrims continued to visit Kipplinge, not just for the spring but above all for "the Holy Sacrament", a few drops of the blood of Jesus which the historian Arild Huitfeldt ascribes to a miracle in the church in 1492. Among those who visited Kipplinge were King Olaf in the late 14th century and Christian II in the beginning of the 16th century, who was always short of funds. During the wars with Sweden, he borrowed money from Kipplinge Church or several occasions thanks to the substantial gifts left by pilgrims.

== The village today ==
The village is largely a residential community but it also has a small firm which manufactures steel stacks and ventilation chimneys.
