= Kippinge Church =

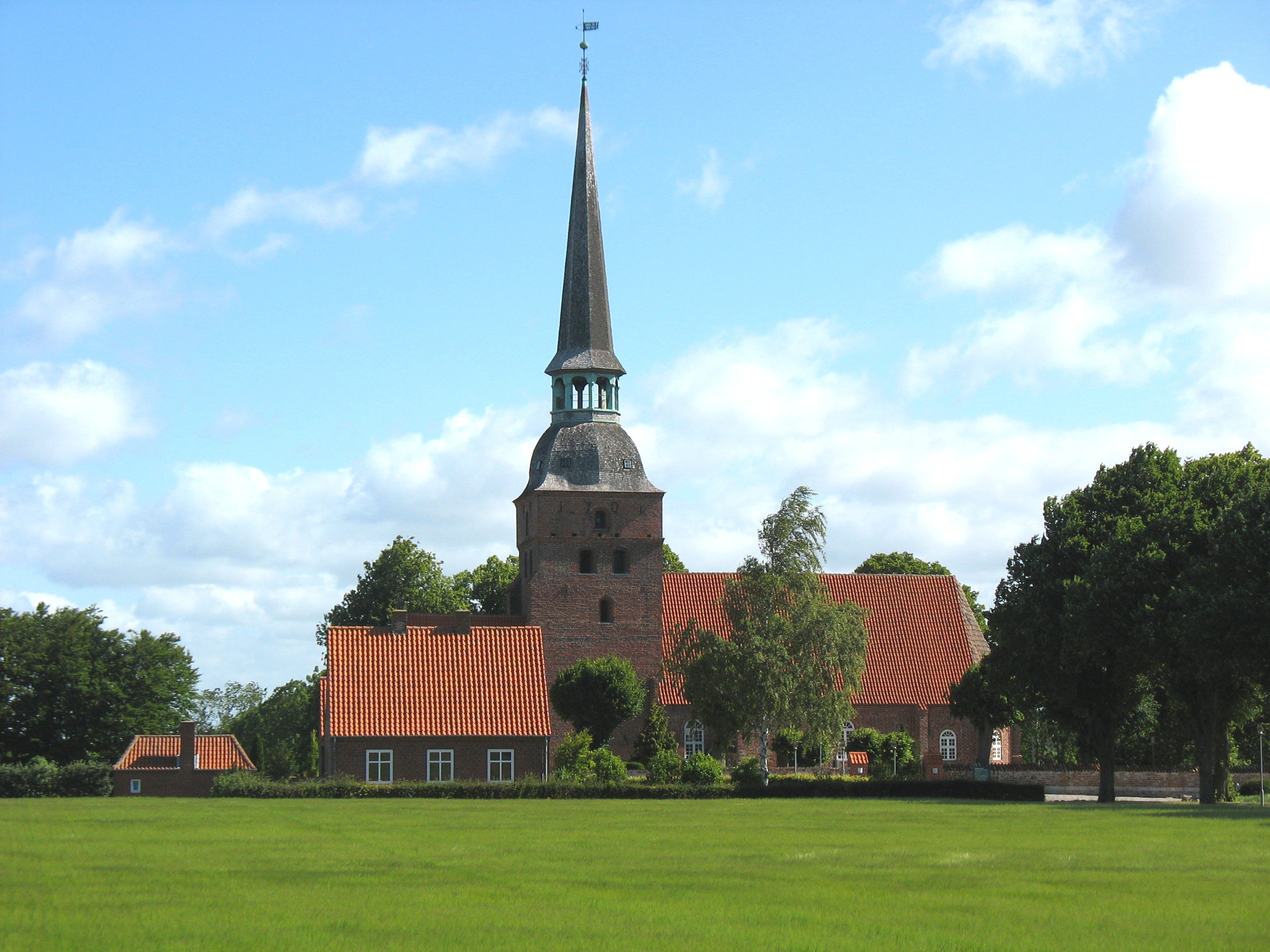
- Kippinge Church
- 54°54′26″N 11°47′30″E
- Location: Falster
- Country: Denmark
- Denomination: Church of Denmark
- Previous denomination: Catholic

History
- Founded: c. 1300
- Dedication: Virgin Mary

Architecture
- Style: Early Gothic; Late Gothic; Baroque

Administration
- Diocese: Diocese of Lolland–Falster
- Deanery: Falster Provsti
- Parish: Nordvestfalster Sogn

Kippinge Church (Danish: Kippinge Kirke) stands alone, midway between Vester Kippinge and Øster Kippinge in northwestern Falster, Denmark. It is west of Redslev wood. Thanks to three reputed miracles, the Early Gothic church attracted many pilgrims until the end of the 19th century. It is known for its rich Renaissance furnishings and its frescos from the mid-14th century.

== History ==
The church subsisted as a result of the healing properties of its holy spring. By 1338, the villages of Vester- and Østerkippinge had grown up on either side of the parish church, which remained on an isolated site in the countryside. In the Middle Ages, the church was dedicated to the Virgin Mary. The church was famous for the pilgrims it attracted over the centuries thanks to three reputed miracles. The first miracle was the bleeding Sacrament in 1492. The second was a miraculous altarpiece depicting the Virgin Mary.

At the beginning of the 16th century, the Crown had calling rights for the appointment of clergy similar to the English advowson. In 1767, it was sold into private ownership but was soon reacquired by the State until 1868, when it was sold to the citizens of the parish. It gained full independence in 1938.

== Architecture ==
The nave, culminating in a chancel with a three-sided end, was built of red brick on a sloping plinth in the Early Gothic style c. 1300. The north door, with its pointed arch, and the priest's door are bricked in while the somewhat modified south door is still in use. The porch and tower were added in the Late Gothic period. The west chapel, adjoining the tower, which is no doubt connected with the pilgrimages, was built slightly before the Reformation. The chancel initially had five small pointed windows which have been replaced with more recent round-arched windows. The Baroque spire was renovated in 1911. Its base takes the form of a sturdy dome with an octagonal lantern. The spire proper is tall and thin.

== Interior and fittings ==
The church provides excellent examples of work intricately carved by Jørgen Ringnis in the Auricular style. The altarpiece (1633), with a central painting probably by Anthonius Clement, is flanked by the figures of Matthew and Mark. It also presents female figures symbolizing Faith, Hope and Charity and is decorated with angels. The pedestal has two figures of Christ, one at his christening, the other at the Last Supper. The figures of Luke and John stand on either side of the cornice.

The elaborately carved octagonal font and canopy are also by Ringnis (1635), the base bearing the figures of the four Evangelists. The double-arched panels present the Annunciation, Christ's birth, the Adoration of the Magi and the Circumcision. The canopy, shaped as an octagonal lantern with arched panels as in the base, bears male and female herms. In the centre, there is a baptismal scene with naked figures. The highly coloured and gilded finish has been restored. The lattice choir screen (1650) consists of nine panels decorated with flowers, herms and symbols of the virtues. The pedestal bears the naked figures of Adam and Eve while the upper cartouche presents Christ bearing the globe. The screen was decorated by Hans Lauridsen in 1680, who also added the six small paintings of a woman in various positions. Ringnis' pulpit (1631) is similar to that in Nakskov Church with figures of the Evangelists and of John the Baptist, Christ and Moses. The coloured decorations and paintings are probably the work of Anthonius Clement.

The church has two old crucifixes, one from the 14th century, the other from the 15th century. The old font in the west chapel is of Gotland limestone. Its base is decorated with four heads.

== Frescos ==
The frescos in the chancel vault are from c. 1300. They were rediscovered under the limewash in 1904 and restored in 1909. The well executed paintings present images principally from Genesis, Chapters 3 and 4, by artists from the Kippinge workshop. In the east panel, Christ flanked by Mary and John the Baptist and two angels can be seen. To the west are frescos of Adam and Eve and the sacrifice of Cain and Abel. The north panel shows the Fratricide and St Michael combating the dragon. The eastern side of the north vault presents the Annunciation adjacent to the Fall.

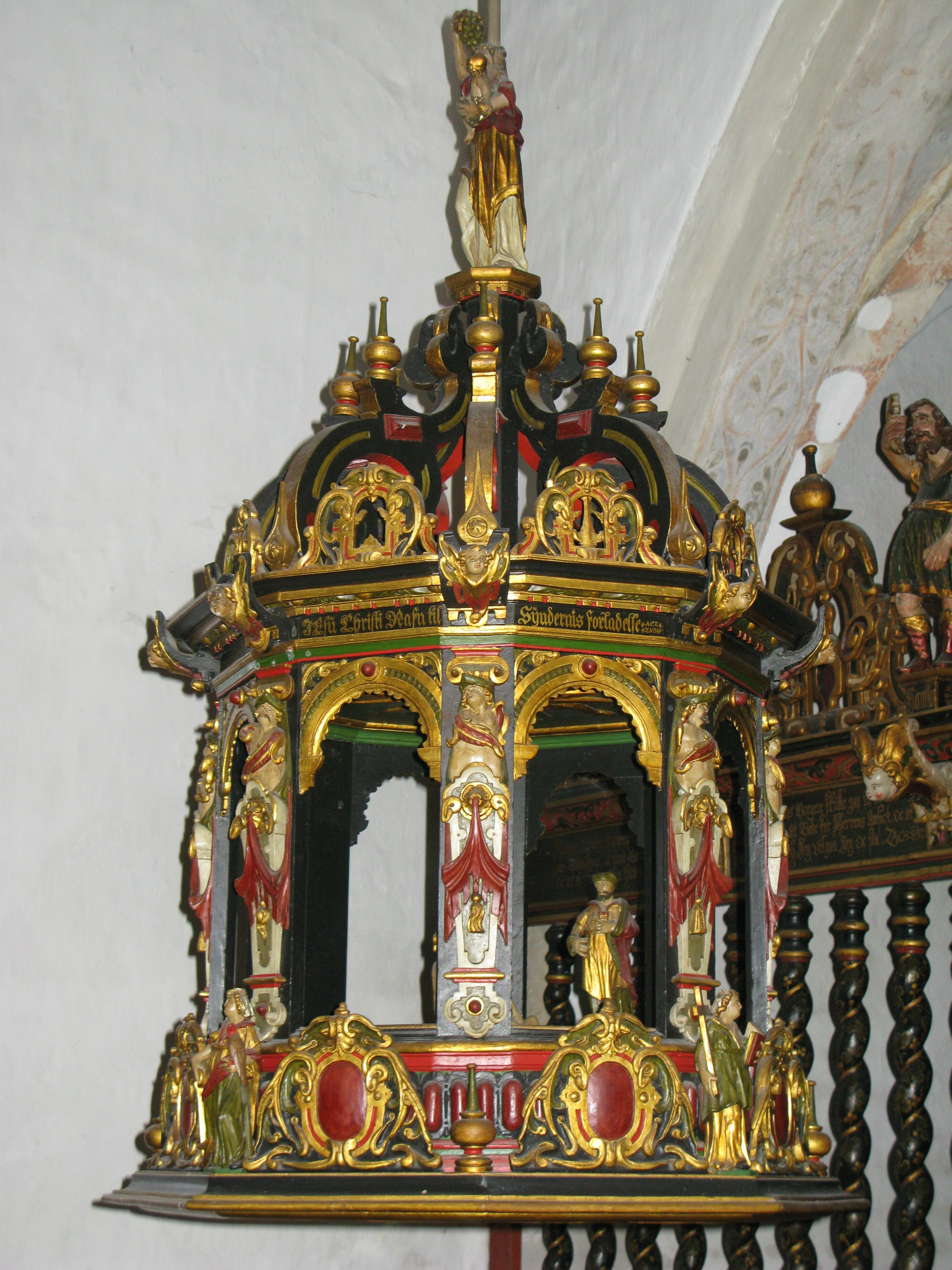
The font canopy

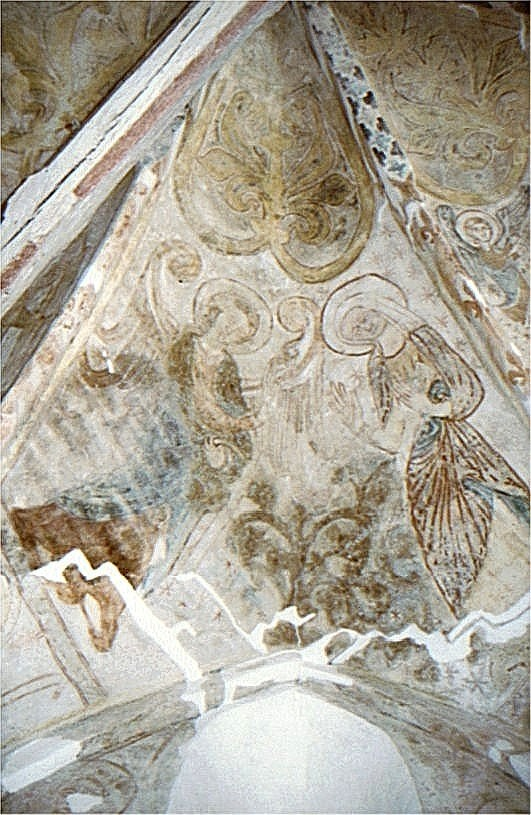
Fresco: the Annunciation

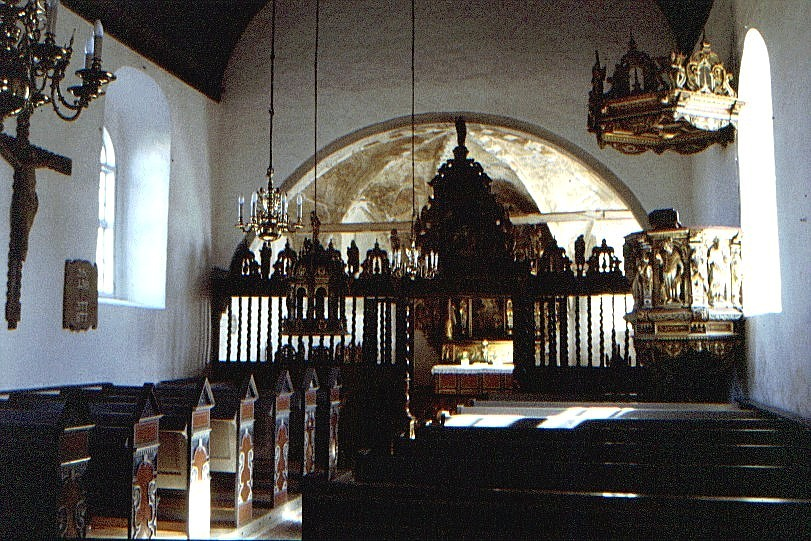
The nave

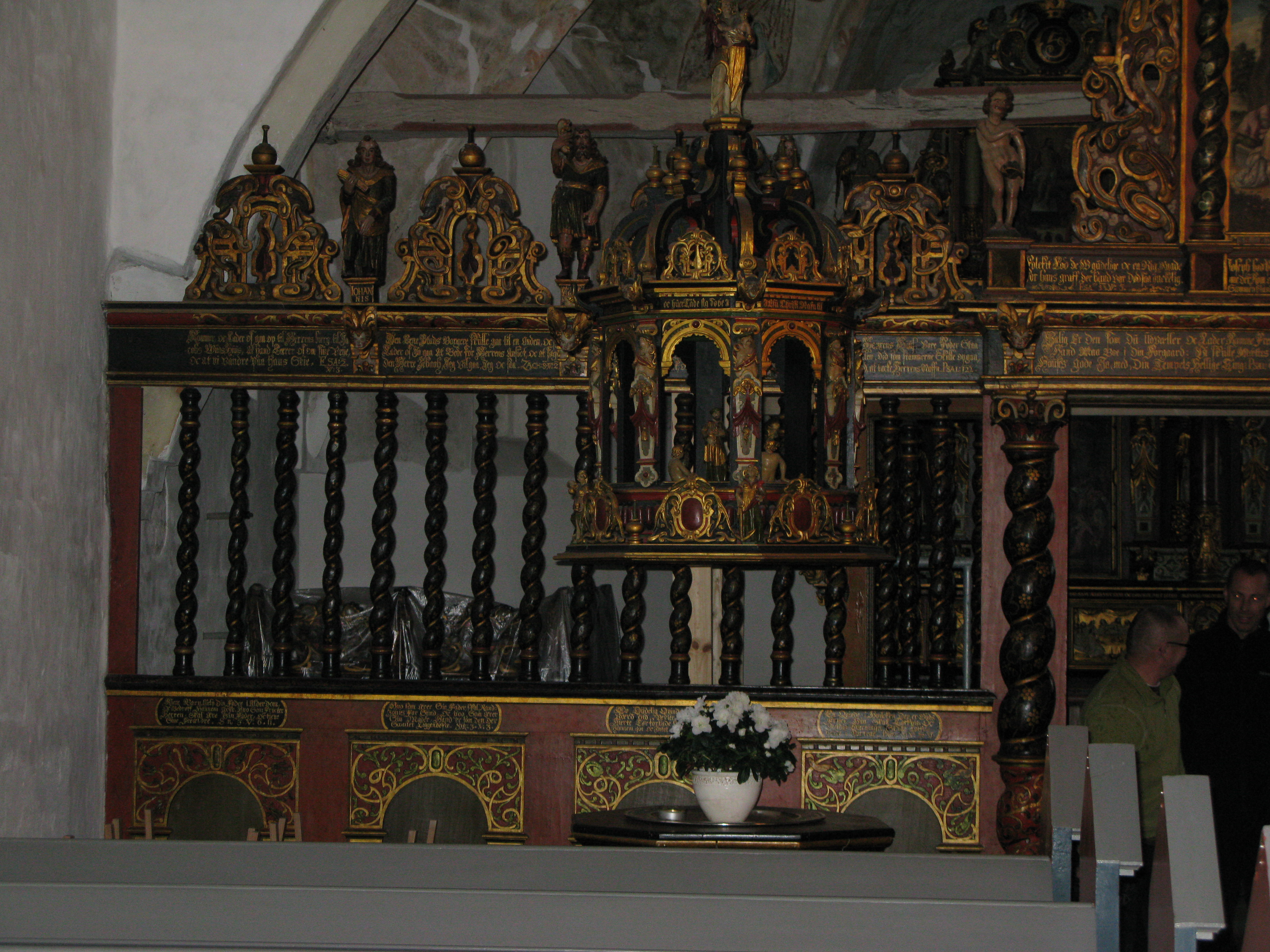
The chancel screen
