= Jens Clausen =

American geneticist (1891–1969)

Jens Christen (Christian) Clausen
- Born: March 11, 1891; Eskilstrup, Denmark
- Died: November 22, 1969 (aged 78); Palo Alto, California
- Citizenship: Danish; American
- Education: University of Copenhagen
- Awards: Order of the Danneborg; Mary Soper Pope Memorial Award (1949)
- Scientific career
- Fields: Botany; Genetics; Ecology
- Workplaces: Carnegie Institution
- Academic advisors: Øjvind Winge
- Author abbrev. (botany): J.C.Clausen

Jens Christen (Christian) Clausen (March 11, 1891 – November 22, 1969) was a Danish-American botanist, geneticist, and ecologist. He is considered a pioneer in the field of ecological and evolutionary genetics of plants.

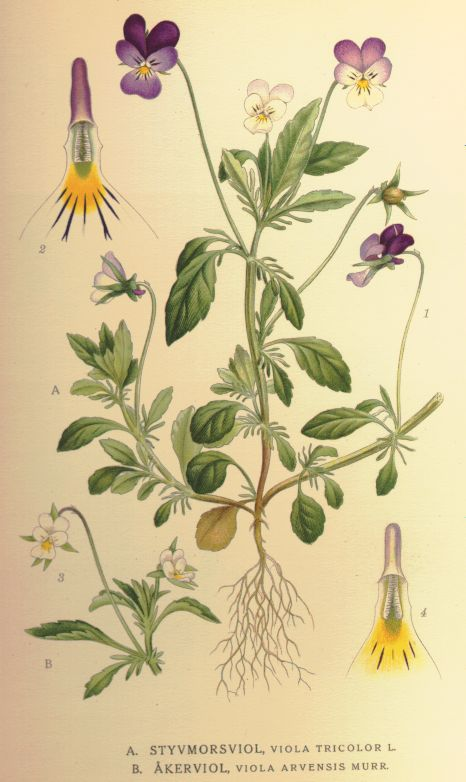
Clausen's Masters and Ph.D. work studied hybrids formed between Viola arvensis and Viola tricolor.

== Biography ==
Clausen was born in Nr. Eskilstrup, Soderup parish on the island of Zealand, Denmark. He was the son of Christen Augustinus Clausen (1858-1938) and Christine (Christensen) Clausen (1856-1933). His parents were farmers and at age 14 he took responsibility for the family farm and was largely educated at home with the assistance of a local school teacher. He studied Mendel's genetics and Darwinian evolutionary theory. In 1913 he entered the University of Copenhagen, where he studied botany, genetics and ecology. Christen Raunkiær suggested he undertake graduate studies and Clausen chose to study the genetics and ecology of the plant family Violaceae. He studied hybridization patterns across a range of environments and described introgression of genes between species. He completed his master's degree in 1920 and was appointed assistant professor to geneticist Øjvind Winge at the Royal Veterinary and Agricultural University in Copenhagen.

In 1926, Clausen was awarded his Ph.D. for his work on Violaceae; his monograph was one of the first publications that combined systematics, ecology and genetics for any plant group. During 1927-1928, Clausen received a Rockefeller scholarship to study at the University of California, Berkeley where he worked on the genetics of the genus Crepis with E. B. Babcock. During this time he met Californian botanist Harvey Monroe Hall, who invited Clausen to return to the United States to work on the ecological genetics of Californian native species. Clausen returned to the California in 1931 as a staff member at the Carnegie Institution of Washington Department of Plant Biology at Stanford, California. He would become a naturalized citizen of the United States during 1943. With taxonomist David D. Keck and physiologist William Hiesey, he formed the first interdisciplinary effort to combine genetics, ecology and systematics in order to understand the ecological genetics of the evolutionary process in California plants. The project lasted 20 years during which they performed some of the classic experiments in plant ecology in which they looked at species formation across Altitudinal zonation using experimental plots at Stanford (near sea level), at Mather near Yosemite National Park (at about 4,600 feet), and at Timberline in the Sierra Nevada (at about 10,000 feet).

== Works ==
Collectively Clausen, Keck and Hiesey wrote five books on their work, including Experimental Studies on the Nature of Species. I. Effect of Varied Environments on Western North American Plants published in 1940 and Experimental Studies on the Nature of Species. III. Environmental Responses of Climatic Races of Achillea in 1948. Clausen produced one additional book about his work based on the Messenger Lectures he gave at Cornell which was published in 1951 as Stages in the Evolution of Plant Species.

== Honors ==
Clausen was elected a member of the National Academy of Sciences, the American Academy of Arts and Sciences, and the Royal Swedish Academy of Sciences; he was also a member of the Botanical Society of America, and the Society for the Study of Evolution. He was a fellow of the California Academy of Sciences and of the American Association for the Advancement of Science. He was knighted in the Order of the Danneborg by Frederik IX of Denmark. Clausen was a member of the First Baptist Church of Palo Alto, California.

== Family ==
Clausen was married to Anna Hansen. Anna supported and assisted with Clausen's scientific career by undertaking "artificial pollinations, back-crossings, fixations, baggings and harvesting" of plants, as well as assisting with the recording and numbering of segregated types, thus providing material and data upon which some of his scientific writings were based.

== Other sources ==
- Smocovitis, V. B. (2000) Clausen, Jens Christen in "American National Biography Online" (Oxford University Press)
