= Eskilstrup =

- Town
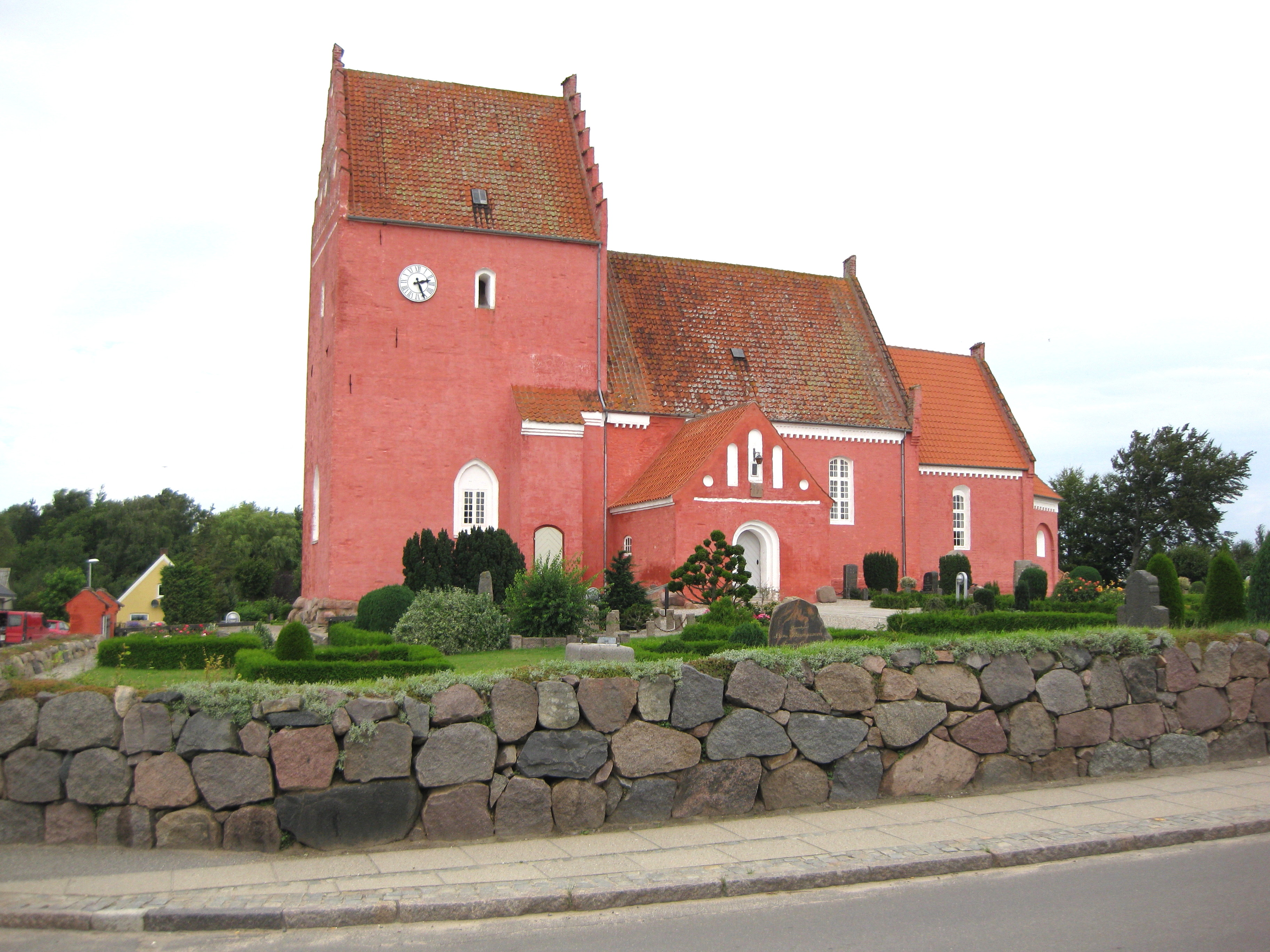
- Eskilstrup Church, Falster

- Location on Falster Eskilstrup (Denmark Region Zealand) Eskilstrup (Denmark)
- Coordinates: 54°51′22″N 11°53′07″E
- Country: Denmark
- Region: Zealand (Sjælland)
- Municipality: Guldborgsund

Area
  - Urban: 0.34 sq mi (0.88 km^{2})

Population (2026)
  - Urban: 1,104
  - Urban density: 3,200/sq mi (1,300/km^{2})
- Time zone: UTC+1 (CET)
  - Summer (DST): UTC+2 (CEST)

Eskilstrup is a town some 12 kilometres (7.5 mi) north of Nykøbing Falster on the Danish island of Falster. As of 2026, it had a population of 1,104.

== History ==
Eskilstrup Church, built in the Romanesque style, dates from the 12th century. In accordance with local tradition, it is painted red. It is best known for its frescos, said to be Denmark's oldest.

The town has grown up around Eskilstrup railway station, which opened together with the Falster Railway in 1872. The earliest buildings included businesses and hotels close to the station on the main street. The railway is now called the South Line, with frequent train stops at Eskilstrup.

== The town today ==
Eskilstrup is conveniently located close to the E47 motorway from Copenhagen to Rødby Havn. It is also served by Eskilstrup railway station, located on the South Line which links Copenhagen with the islands of Falster and Lolland. Facilities include a school, sports hall, day nursery, food store, and hotel. There are beech woods in the surrounding countryside, and it is not far to the coast. Some 300 children attend the local school. Local landmarks include the water tower, windmill, and sports hall. Nearby Ønslev benefits from the town's activities and services.

== Attractions ==
Eskilstrup is home to Danmarks Traktormuseum (Denmark's Tractor Museum), with some 200 tractors from the beginnings up to 1970. Also in the neighbourhood is the Krokodille Zoo, with Europe's largest collection of living crocodiles. One of the region's oldest churches, Torskilstrup Church, lies 4 km (2.5 mi) northeast of Eskilstrup.

== Notable people ==
- Jens Clausen (1891 in Eskilstrup – 1969) a Danish-American botanist, geneticist and ecologist
- Jørgen Hare (1923 in Eskilstrup – 2007) a Danish sports shooter, competed at the 1952 Summer Olympics
- Hjalmar Petersen (1890 in Eskilstrup - 1968 in Columbus, Ohio) a Danish-American politician who was the 23rd Governor of Minnesota

Preceding station	DSB	Following station
Nørre Alslev towards Næstved	Næstved–Nykøbing F Regional train	Nykøbing F Terminus
