= Guldborgsund Zoo =

- Interactive map of Guldborgsund Zoo
- 54°46′01″N 11°53′29″E
- Date opened: 1933
- Location: Nykøbing, Falster
- No. of species: 80

Guldborgsund Zoo (Danish: Guldborgsund Zoo & Botanisk Have; "Guldborgsund Zoo & Botanic Gardens") is a zoo with some 80 species of animals. Located in Nykøbing on the Danish island of Falster, its gardens display thousands of flowers in the summer months.

== History ==
The zoological garden was established in 1933 by Carl Heinz Krag, a 20-year-old pet shop owner, with help from friends and family. There were over 100,000 visitors in the first year. The facility closed during World War II, but re-opened afterwards, becoming a people's park in 1970.

== Features ==
Known earlier as Nykøbing Falster Zoo, Guldborgsund Zoo is popularly known as Folkeparken or "The People's Park" as it is a pleasant family attraction with many facilities for the animals. On entering, visitors meet two rocky caves with Asian dwarf otters. The zoo also has several aviaries, the recent ones far more impressive than the older, rather dark pheasant farms. Open areas house ungulates, chital deer and llamas. In the old tropical house, there are capuchin monkeys, marmosets, and a terrarium for reptiles including iguanas and snakes. The new South American tropical house exhibits snap turtles and dwarf caimans. The last facility on the route is a tiger cage.
