= Ønslev =

- Town
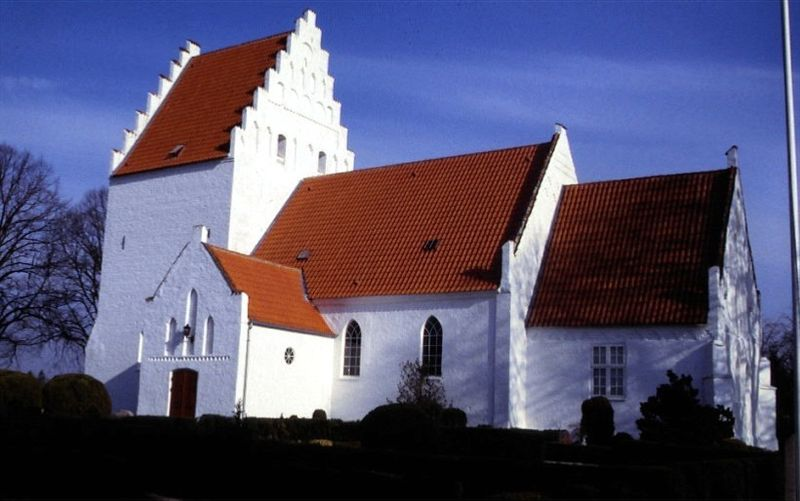
- Ønslev Church, Falster

- Location on Falster
- Coordinates: 54°50′57″N 11°51′03″E
- Country: Denmark
- Region: Zealand (Sjælland)
- Municipality: Guldborgsund

Population (2026)
  - Total: 403
- Time zone: UTC+1 (CET)
  - Summer (DST): UTC+2 (CEST)

Ønslev is a village 10 kilometres (6.2 mi) north of Nykøbing on the Danish island of Falster. In January 2026 it had a population of 403.

== Etymology ==
The name is made up of the man's name "Øthan" and "lef", hereditary estate. It is first documented in the Danish Census Book (1231) as "Othænslef".

== History ==
Ønslev Church is about half a kilometer east of the village. Dating from c. 1200, it is built in the Early Gothic style.

In 1694, the parishes of Ønslev and Eskilstrup were combined into one as Ønslev–Eskildstrup. Under the State sale of 1766, the entire parish was purchased by Johan Christopher von Westen, governed by Vestenborg Manor. From the beginning of the 19th century, many farms came into private ownership leading families to establish themselves in the village. There were two large farms, 13 medium-size farms and 20 houses in the village by the end of the century. The first school was established in 1807, the second in 1924 and since 1954 the villages's children have attended the new school in Eskilstrup. The brewery, Ønslev Bryggeri, founded in 1880, was closed some years ago. At the beginning of the 20th century, the market gardener P. Damgaard produced mainly tomatoes, cucumbers and melons in his 12 greenhouses.

== The village today ==
The village now depends largely on Eskilstrup, 3 km to the east, for its school, activities, shops and services.

== Notable people ==
- Jørgen Balthasar Dalhoff (1800–1890), goldsmith
