= Connie Kruckow =

Danish nurse (born 1953)

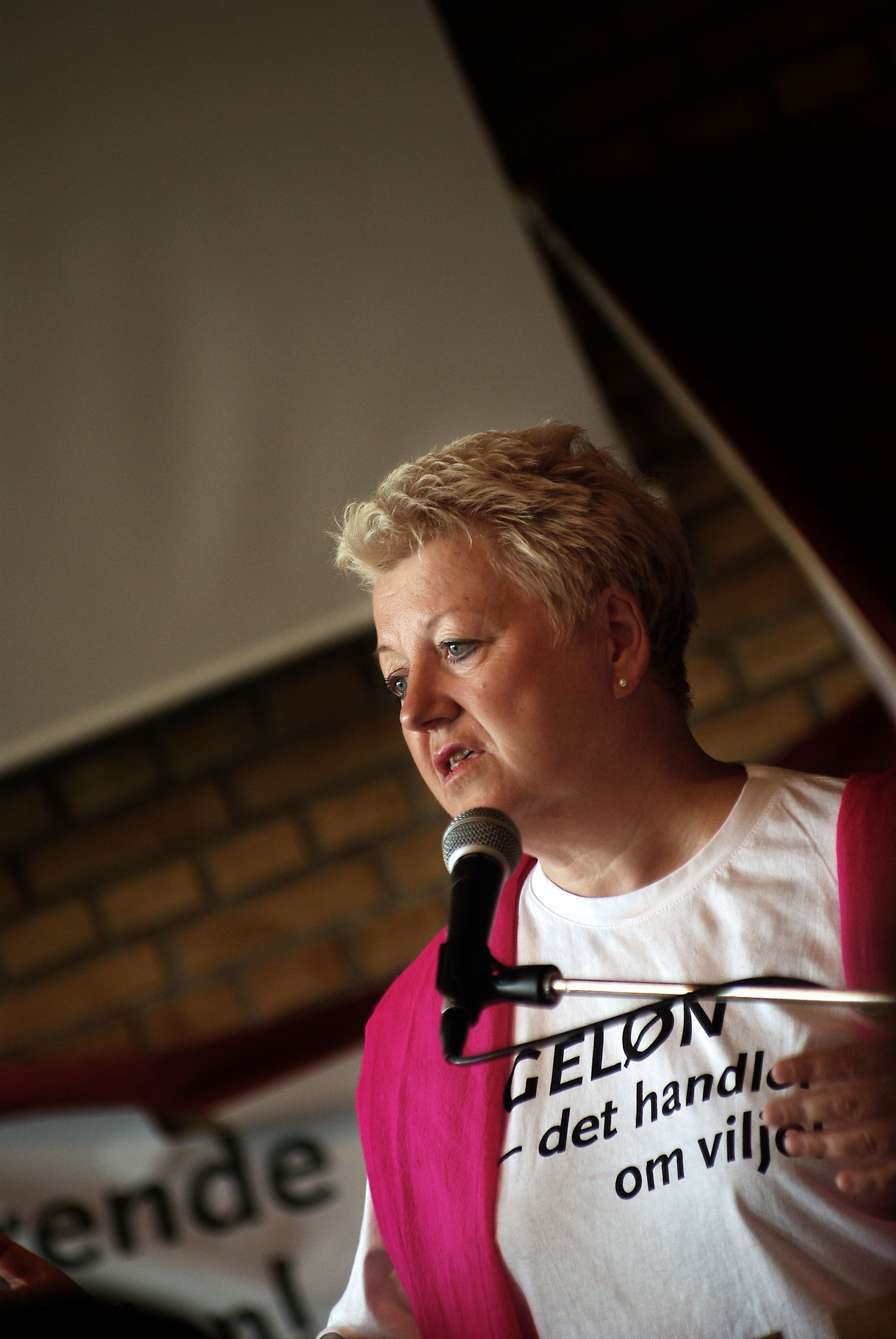
Connie Kruckow (2008)

Connie Kruckow (born 1953) is a Danish nurse who from 2000 to 2009 headed The Danish Nurses' Organization (Dansk Sygeplejeråd or DSR). In 2008, she led the nurses into a historic conflict.

== Biography ==
Born on the Danish island of Falster, Kruckow is the daughter of a manual labourer and his home-going wife. After qualifying as a nurse, she worked at Hillerød Hospital for 11 years before becoming union secretary at the Danish Nurses' Organization. Thereafter she was appointed regional head for Frederiksborg County.

Kruckow was elected head of the Danish Nurses' Organization in 2000, promising salary increases for the Danish nurses, a feat her predecessor Jette Søe had been unable to achieve. In 2008, when the nurses were still receiving less than she thought they deserved, she called them out on strike in protest. After an extended conflict which led to operations being cancelled in Danish hospitals over a period of eight weeks, in June 2008, Kruckow succeeded in her negotiations with the regions, obtaining a pay rise of 13.3% over the following three years. She commented: "I am satisfied with the agreement which shows it can pay to go on strike." The negotiations had also achieved equal pay for men and women as well as equal training opportunities.

Kruckow resigned as head of the nurses' organization, three years before the end of her term. She felt she needed to give up the powerful position which frequently led to disagreements and harsh personal criticism. Despite having reached the age of 56, she succeeded in finding a job as an ordinary nurse in the gynaecology department of Hillerød Hospital. She was happy to have returned to her former profession as it was far more relaxing and gave her more free time for herself.

Kruckow has two grown children with her former husband, a son and a daughter. Her daughter has followed in her mother's footsteps, also working as a nurse.
