= Crocodile Zoo, Falster =

Crocodile Zoo

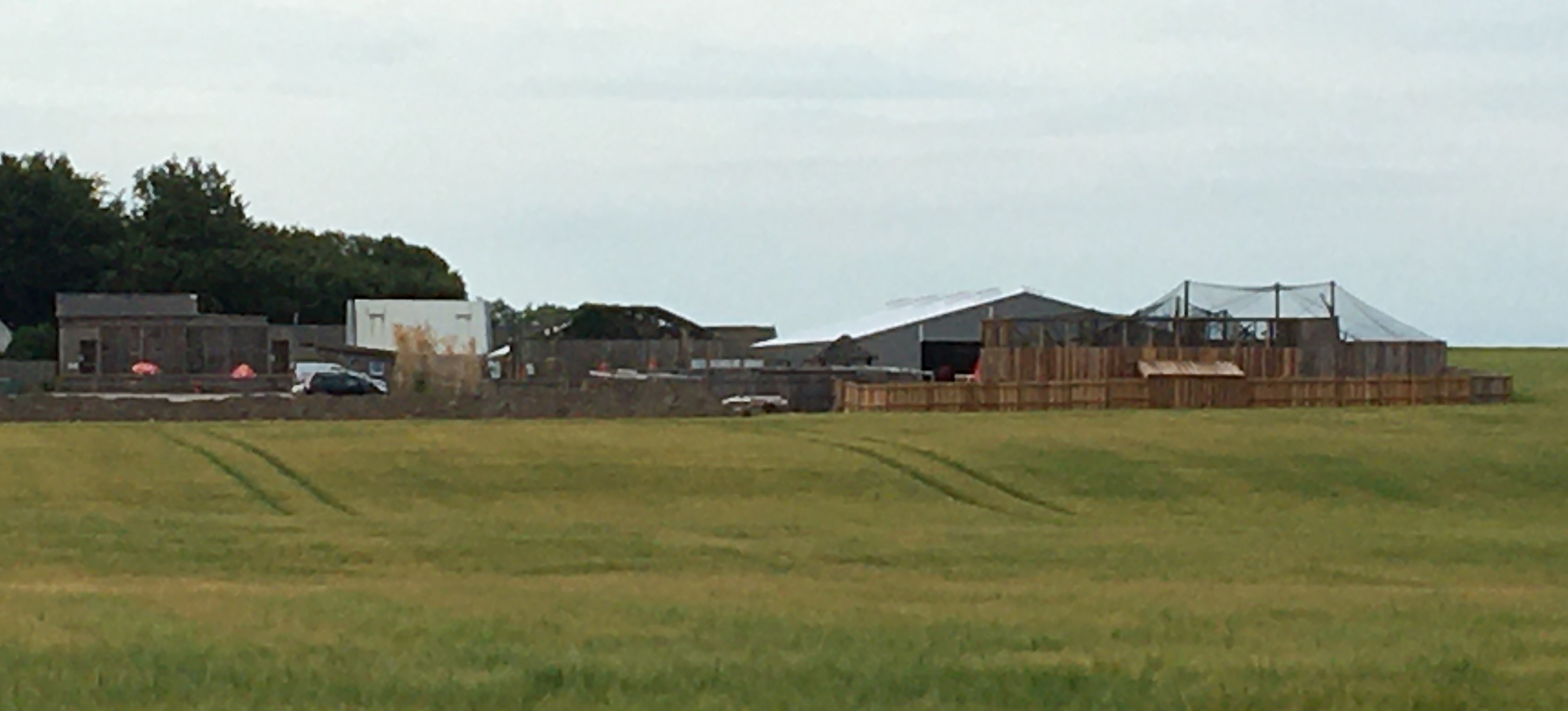
- Interactive map of Crocodile Zoo
- 54°51′50″N 11°54′35″E
- Date opened: June 2000
- Location: Gundslevmagle, near Eskilstrup, Falster, Denmark
- Annual visitors: 45,000 (2022)
- Website: www.krokodillezoo.dk

The Crocodile Zoo (Danish: Krokodille Zoo) is a zoo on the Danish island of Falster. It is located northeast of Eskilstrup, towards the northern centre of the island. Established in 2000, the zoo has the world's largest collection of crocodilians (crocodiles, alligators, caimans, gharial and relatives) with almost all existing species (24 species, same as St. Augustine Alligator Farm Zoological Park). Their male Nile crocodile Sobek, at more than 5 m (16.4 ft) long and 600 kg (1,320 lb) in weight, is the largest crocodilian in Europe, and Medusa, a 6.3 m (20.7 ft) reticulated python, is among the largest snakes in Europe. Although primarily focussed on crocodilians, the zoo is also home to cougar (puma), clouded leopard, tayra, callitrichid monkeys, six-banded armadillos, monitor lizards, iguanas, hydrosaurs, parrots, and giant tortoises.

== History and partners ==
Founded by Rene Hedegaard, it is the largest zoo of its kind in Europe. Developed in cooperation with Bøgecentret, the zoo opened to the public in June 2000.

The Crocodile Zoo works closely with conservation authorities and other zoos. A portion of each sold admission ticket is contributed towards conservation projects conducted by the IUCN Crocodile Specialist Group. All crocodilians in the zoo come from prior captivity. Crocodile Zoo participates in several breeding programs, and coordinates the European programs for the black caiman and Philippine crocodile. Their Orinoco crocodiles are part of a program involving US zoos, the FUDECI foundation (which is responsible for releasing Orinoco crocodiles to the wild) and the Venezuelan authorities.

== Exhibits ==
The Crocodile Zoo is located at an old former farm in the countryside and provides a good opportunity to see the difference between crocodiles, alligators, caimans, gharial and their relatives. Crocodilians are inactive most of the time but with so many species, at least one of them is likely to be active during a visit. The crocodilians are housed in species-specific enclosures with plants and artificial cliffs, some sharing their exhibits with turtles. They were formerly housed within one building (some of the more temperature tolerant species are outside when the weather permits), but in 2023 a new 1,000 m^{2} (11,000 sq ft) tropical hall was opened to provide additional space. As of 2023, 18 of their 24 crocodilian species had bred at the zoo, which is more than any other facility in the world. Among the 24 species of crocodilians that are on display are the only Orinoco crocodiles outside of the Americas.

Although mainly focussed on crocodilians, the zoo is also home to a number of other animals, including clouded leopards since 2014 (first bred 2019), cougars since 2019 (first bred 2023) and tayras since 2020 (first bred 2020), being the only Danish zoo exhibiting any of these three species, as well as callitrichid monkeys, parrots and various reptiles such as giant tortoises.
