= Rasmus Sigvardt =

Rasmus Sigvardt (born 26 February 1886) was a mechanic from Orehoved on the Danish island of Falster. In 1904, he opened a cycle repair shop which later developed into an engine factory, specializing in boat motors and mechanized fruit-tree sprayers.

== Career ==
The little workshop Sigvardt opened in 1904 was only 120 square feet (11 m^{2}) but in 1906 he expanded it to 450 square feet (42 m^{2}). Around that time, when motorcycles came to Denmark, he was one of the first to obtain the tools he needed for their maintenance and repair. In 1909, he built even larger facilities, where he and his staff of three could repair automobiles, motorcycles and boat motors.

In 1915, the factory began to manufacture two-stroke glow fuel or gasoline engines to serve as boat motors. They were marketed as R. S. M. Motorer from R. Sigvardts Motorfabrik. By the 1920s, Sigvardt was manufacturing even more sophisticated engines, always keeping up to date with developments. In 1926, he began manufacturing spraying equipment for fields and gardens, marketing Denmark's first mechanized sprayer by the end of the same year. By that time he was employing 14 workmen. He also made a success of stationary engines for winching. While continuing his engine business, he later also moved into radios which he assembled himself until he met competition from larger manufacturers.

In 1936, Sigvardt organized the Brohallen bridge exhibition in Orehoved in connection with the building of the Storstrøm Bridge. In 1951, he had 12 houses built in the town for his factory employees. In 1970, the Sigvardt factory was taken over by Hardi International. It has now moved to Nørre Alslev where it is the town's largest employer.
