= Jørgen Hare =

Danish sports shooter (1923–2007)

Personal information
- Born: 15 June 1923 Eskilstrup, Denmark
- Died: 14 June 2007 (aged 83) Eskilstrup, Denmark

Sport
- Sport: Sports shooting

Jørgen Hare (15 June 1923 – 14 June 2007) was a Danish sports shooter. He competed in the 50 m rifle, prone event at the 1952 Summer Olympics.
