= Orehoved =

- Town
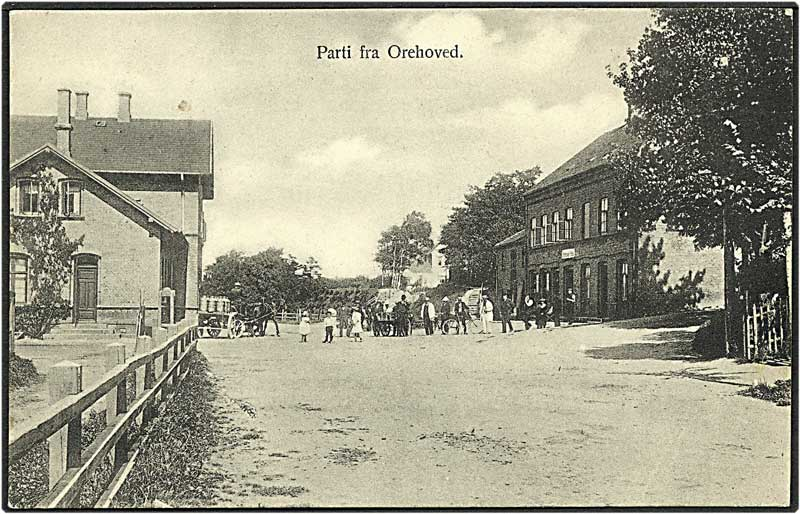
- Old postcard view of Orehoved, Falster

- Location on Falster
- Coordinates: 54°57′11″N 11°51′26″E
- Country: Denmark
- Region: Zealand (Sjælland)
- Municipality: Guldborgsund

Population (2026)
  - Total: 416
- Time zone: UTC+1 (CET)
  - Summer (DST): UTC+2 (CEST)

Orehoved is a small harbour town in the north of the Danish island of Falster. It grew up mainly as a result of the railway and ferry services in the late 19th century. As of 2026, it has a population of 416.

== Etymology ==
The element "ore" stems from Old Danish "wara", meaning an untended field or a point. The first documented reference to the place is Orehoffuit in 1509.

== History ==
Orehoved was probably established around the 14th century at a clearing in the forest. There is nothing left of the old village which in 1509 consisted of just four copyholds. There was little success with farming, prompting a comment in the accounts of 1662 stating that there were only two fields with very poor soil. In 1766, the village became the property of Hvededal Farm but returned to the State in 1793. The farmers became independent landowners in the 1850s but the State kept the forests which were sold to Johannes Wilhjelm in 1869. Wilhjelm built a new manor called Orenæsgård in 1869 but it was torn down in 1982.

The Orehoeved–Nykøbing railway opened in 1872, with a ferry connection to Masnedø in 1884. It later became a train ferry bringing prosperity to Orehoved including a new harbour and a railway station. Further station facilities came in 1937 with the completion of the Storstrøm Bridge. The red brick station building has now been partly converted into residential accommodation.

Orehoved Lighthouse was built in 1895 on the northwest corner of the quay, replacing an earlier light which had simply been placed on a mast at the end of the railway pier. A blue gas burner was installed in 1912. In 1933, a third storey was added to the tower, bringing it up to a height of 11 metres (36 ft).

In 1904, Rasmus Sigvardt opened a bicycle repair shop in Orehoved, soon extending it to handle motorcycles. In 1909, he opened new premises with facilities for repairing cars, motorcycles and motorboat engines. Over the years, the business developed into a factory first for manufacturing engines for boats and the extending into motors and engines for other applications, especially spraying equipment. In 1970, the factory was purchased by Hardi International and has now been moved to Nørre Alslev.

In 1945, Orehoved Træ- og Finerindustri, a wood and veneer factory, opened in the harbour area, soon gaining an international reputation. Since the factory's closure in 1984, other businesses have taken over the premises. Major extensions to the harbour were made in 1960 with later additions towards the west.

== The town today ==
Orehoved Harbour, since 1998 administered by Nykøbing Falster Harbour, has facilities for commercial shipping and for pleasure craft. While Orehoved has a food store, other facilities (school, day nursery, sports hall) are available in nearby Nørre Vedby. only 3 kilometres (1.9 mi) to the south.
