= Falster =

Island in south-eastern Denmark

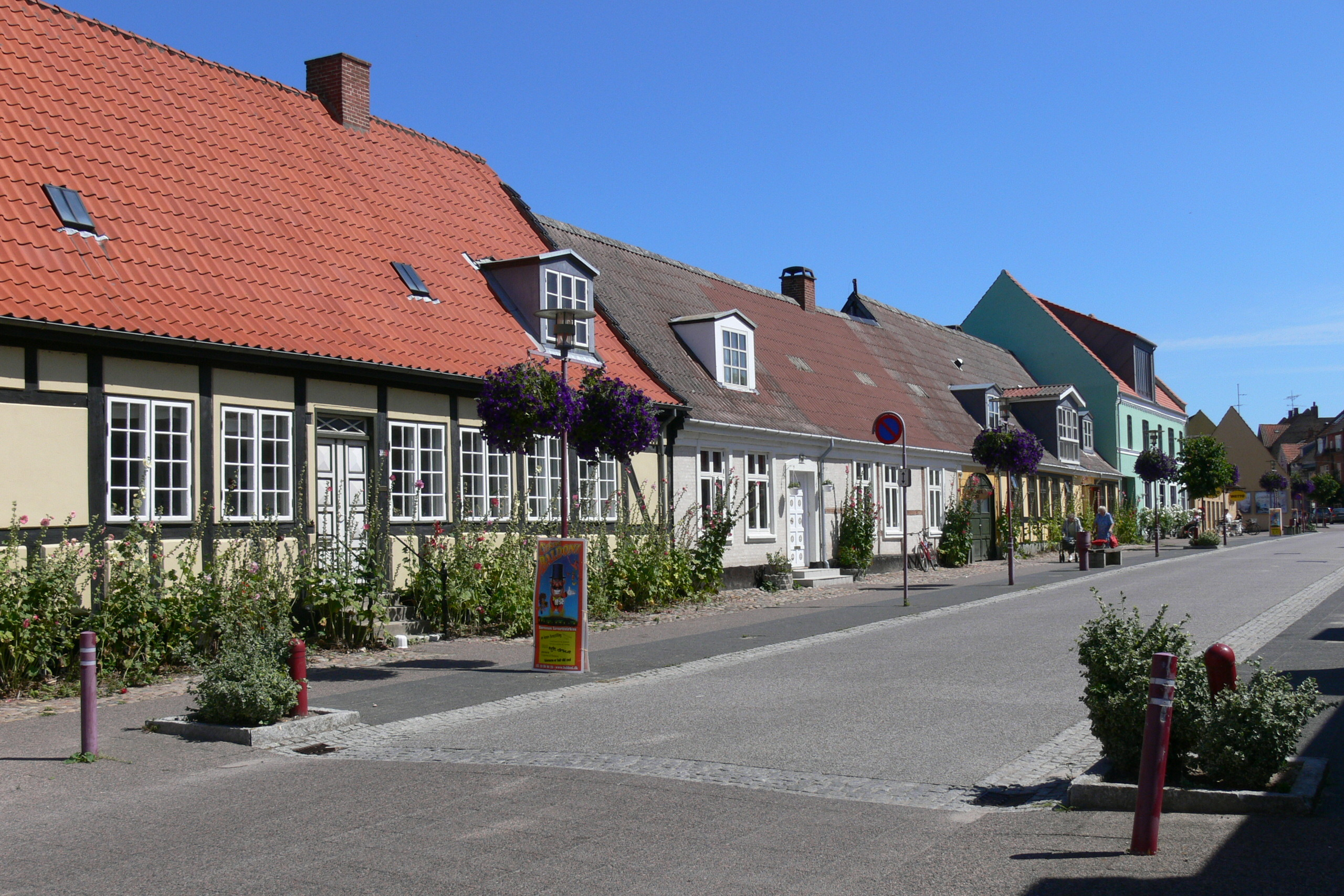
- Old houses in Stubbekøbing, Falster

Geography
- Location: Kattegat, Belts and Sound (Source:International hydrographic organization)
- Coordinates: 54°48′N 11°58′E
- Area: 486.2 km^{2} (187.7 sq mi)

Administration
- Denmark
- Region: Region Zealand
- Municipality: Guldborgsund Municipality
- Largest settlement: Nykøbing Falster (pop. 16,405)

Demographics
- Population: 43,398 (2010)
- Pop. density: 89.25/km^{2} (231.16/sq mi)

Falster (Danish: [ˈfælˀstɐ]) is an island in south-eastern Denmark with an area of 486.2 km^{2} (187.7 sq mi) and 43,398 inhabitants as of 1 January 2010. Located in the Kattegat, Belts and Sound area, it is part of Region Zealand and is administered by Guldborgsund Municipality. Falster includes Denmark's southernmost point, Gedser Odde, near Gedser.

The largest town is Nykøbing Falster with over 40% of the island's inhabitants. Other towns include Stubbekøbing, Nørre Alslev and Gedser.

Falster has motor and railway links both to the larger island of Zealand to the north and to the island of Lolland to the south-west. These links also lead to the smaller islands of Masnedø and Farø. European route E47 links Copenhagen to Hamburg (Germany) via Falster.

== History ==
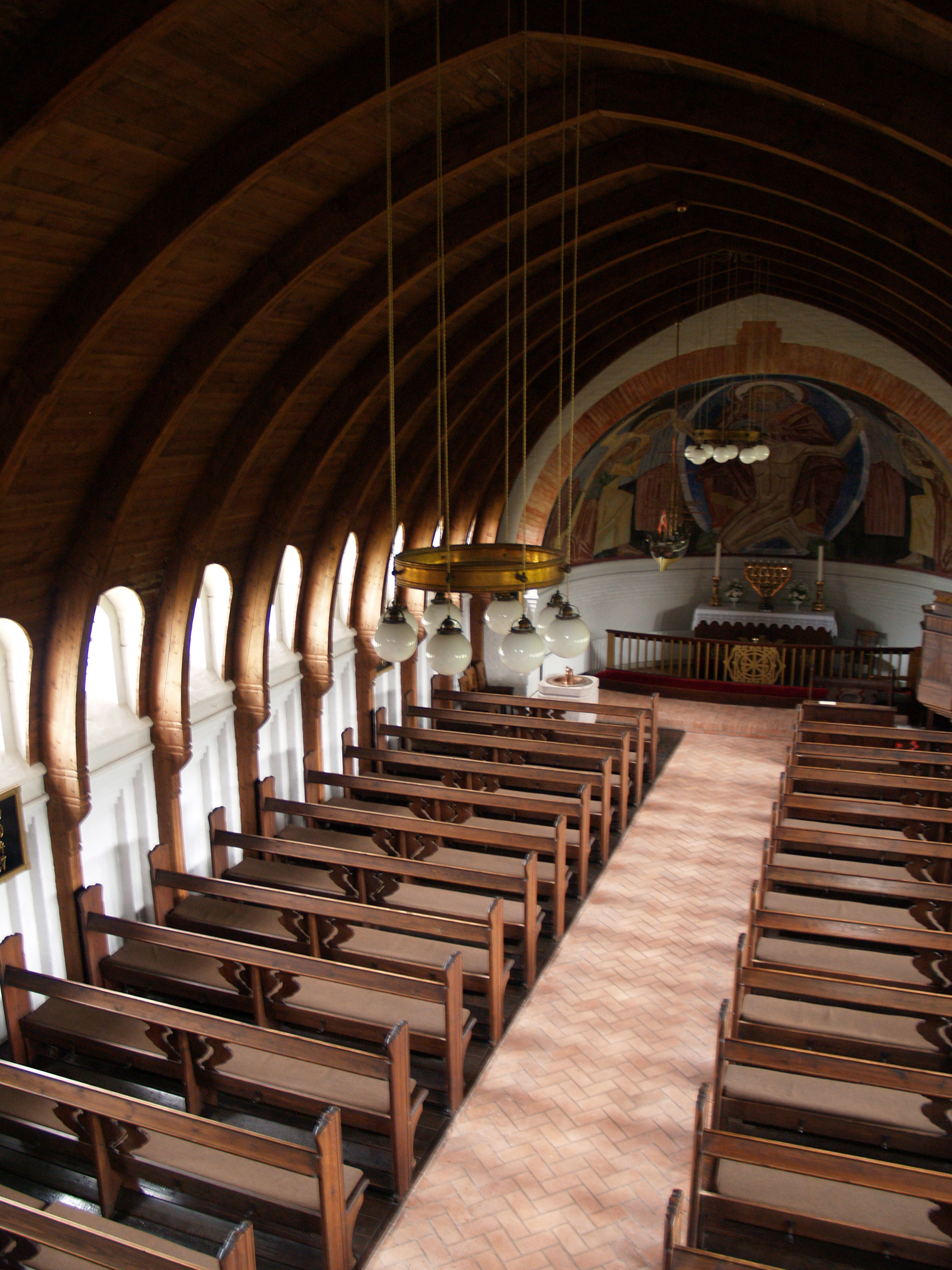
Interior of Gedser Church, designed by Peder Vilhelm Jensen-Klint

From medieval times until 1766, most of Falster belonged to the crown. King Valdemar's Census Book from c. 1231 lists all the parishes and most of the villages. Falster's two main towns, Nykøbing and Stubbekøbing, were both founded towards the end of the 12th century.

In medieval times, the island was marked by wars with the Wends in 1158 and with Lübeck in 1253. The census of 1509 includes only 90 of the 110 villages mentioned earlier. By contrast, it mentions 29 new settlements mainly along the coast.

In the 16th century, Falster had a number of farms which were owned by the local nobility but, from 1560 to 1630, they were slowly returned to the crown which once again owned the entire island. Therefore, Falster could therefore be used as the dowry for Frederick III's wife, Sophie Amalie but as a result of the high taxes which resulted, many of the farms were deserted.

Falster was managed as a crown estate from 1718 until 1766 when it was sold by auction and divided up into ten large farms, five of which were given large new fields. But as the fields had to be prepared through the serfdom of local peasants, this led to many disputes.

The villages were replaced by the community from 1778 to 1814, and gradually moved to freehold tenants, a process which was only completed in about 1860.

Falster experienced significant economic expansion after 1880 when, with the establishment of cooperative dairies and slaughterhouses, farming was concentrated on livestock production and forage crops. There was also an increase in the cultivation of sugar beet which was processed in factories at Nykøbing and Stubbekøbing between 1890 and 1914. Many seasonal workers, especially women, from Sweden and Poland came to help with harvesting the sugar beet and some of them stayed.

With the new railway from Orehoved to Nykøbing in 1872 and railway ferries to Masnedø (1884) and Warnemünde (1903), Falster slowly became a traffic hub. Its position was reinforced by the construction of the Storstrøm Bridge (1937) and Farø Bridges (1985).

Since 1975, Falster has been marked by high unemployment as a result of harder times for both farming and industry.

== Towns and villages ==
As of 2012, populations were as follows:

Nykøbing Falster	16,394
Nørre Alslev	2,384
Stubbekøbing	2,304
Nordbyen	1,693
Væggerløse	1,347
Idestrup	1,234
Eskilstrup	1,091

Gedser	793
Marielyst	676
Horbelev	595
Orehoved	476
Ønslev	404
Systofte Skovby	347

Sønder Vedby Skovhuse	317
Horreby	306
Nykøbing Strandhuse	277
Øster Kippinge	261
Hasselø Plantage	236
Tingsted	228

== Tourism ==
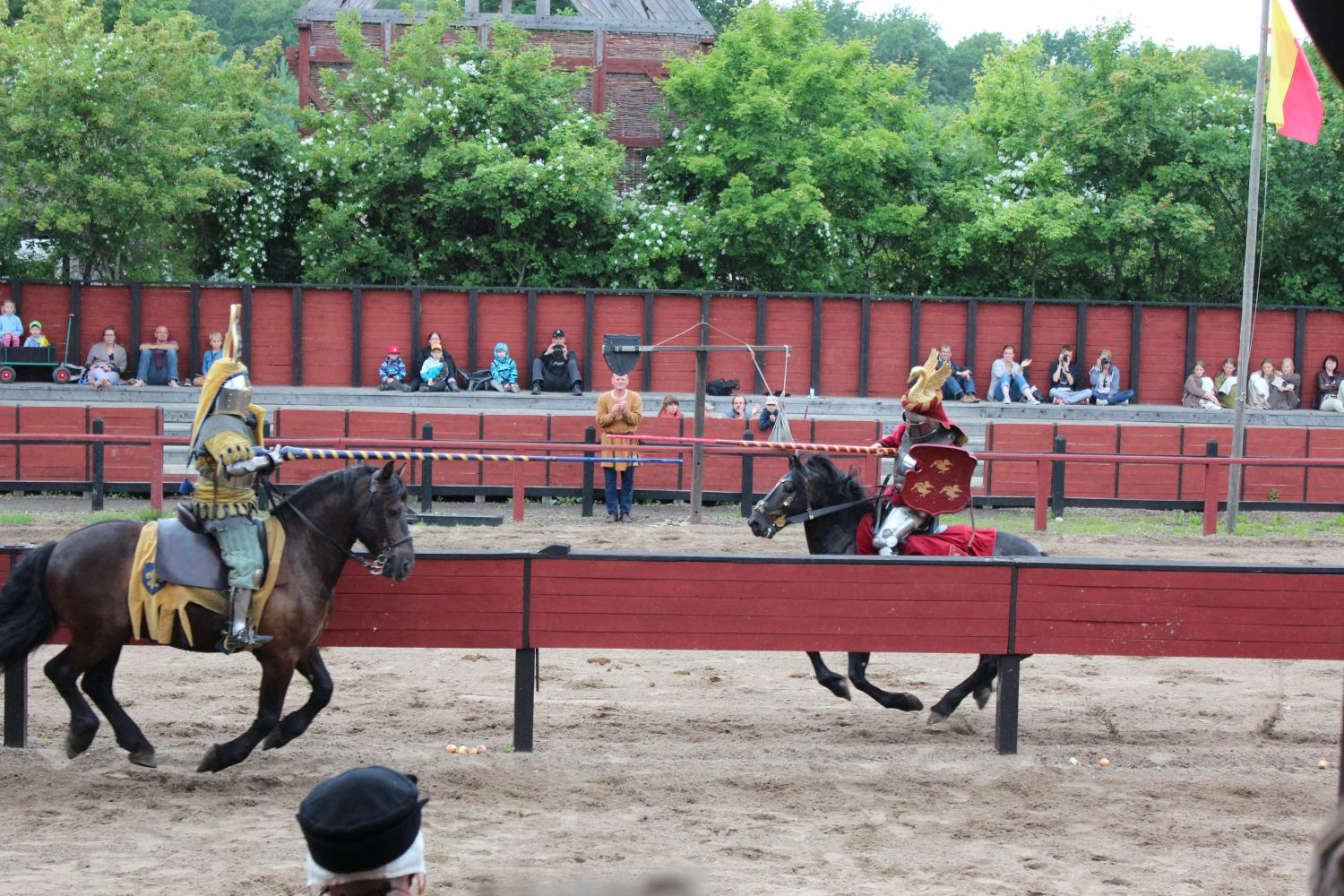
Jousting at the Middle Ages Centre.

With its marinas, sandy beaches and cycle tracks, Falster attracts tourists who wish to have relaxing holidays in unspoilt surroundings. One of the most popular resorts is Marielyst on the east coast.

Nykøbing offers a number of attractions including its old-town atmosphere with narrow streets. Of particular interest are the Middle Ages Centre, which is an open-air museum build as a part of a medieval town around year 1400 and the biggest attraction of the town. Among other attractions in Nykøbing are the Abbey Church (Klosterkirke) which was built in the 15th century, a City Museum and a zoo.

Scattered around the island are several minor museum such as Danish Tractor Museum and Crocodile Zoo in Eskilstrup, a motorbike and radio Museum in Stubbekøbing and a geological museum in Gedser, which holds the world's largest polished garnet by the name of "Nordstjernen" (the Northern Star).

== Transport ==
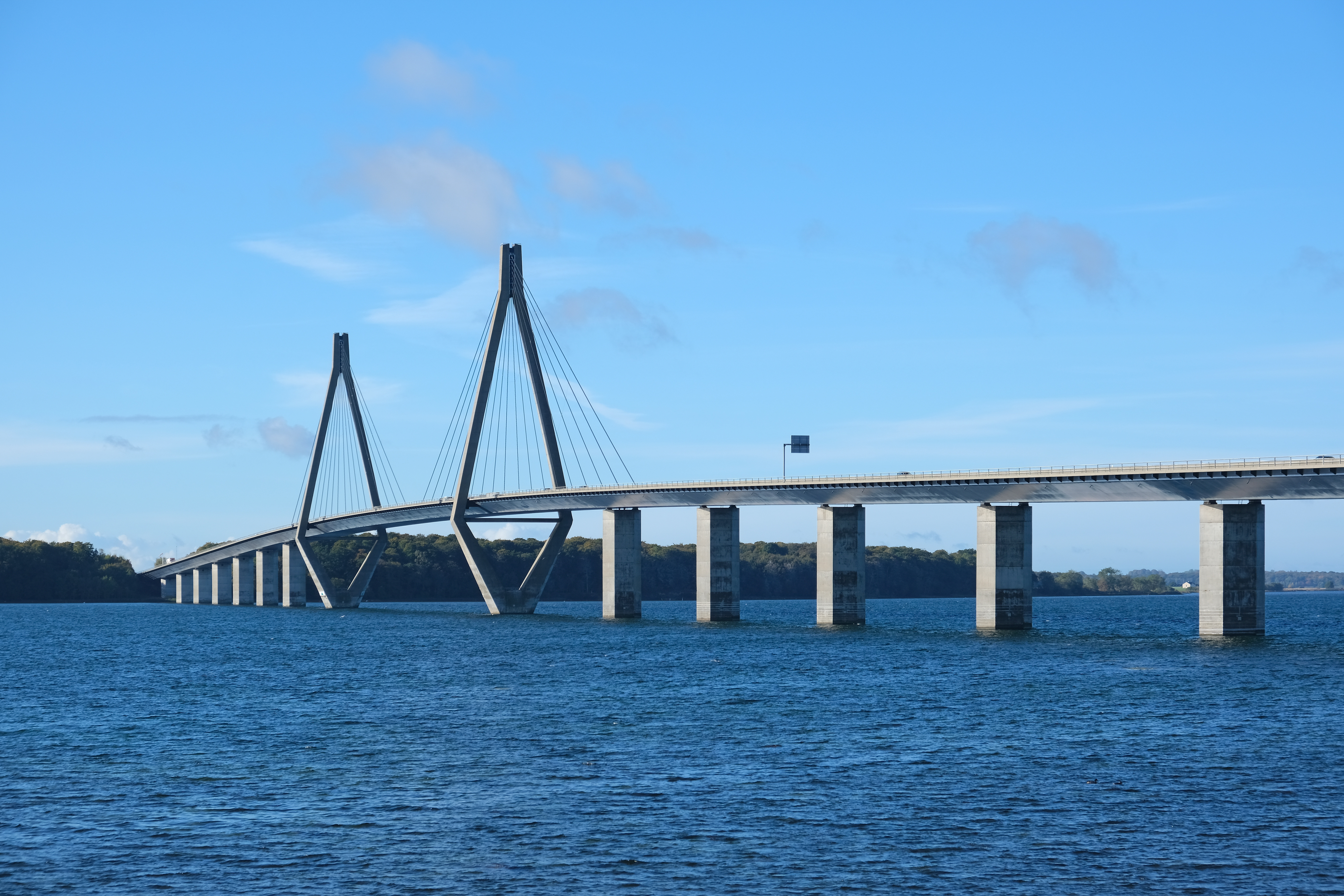
Farø south bridge to Falster

Falster has a motorway and trunk roads linking its towns and villages.

Falster is connected to the larger island of Zealand to the north by the Farø Bridges (Farøbroerne) on European route E47 linking Copenhagen to Hamburg and the south. The Farø bridges join on the small island of Farø, and from there a further bridge gives access to the eastern neighbouring island of Møn. Falster is also connected to Zealand via the Storstrøm and Masnedsund bridges, via the island of Masnedø.

To the south-west, the E47 connects Falster to the island of Lolland via a tunnel under the Guldborgsund strait. There are two other bridges connecting to Lolland: the Guldborgsund Bridge at the northern end of the strait and the Frederick IX Bridge at Nykøbing Falster.

Nykøbing Falster's railway station is operated by Danish State Railways. There are regular passenger train services to Copenhagen via Ringsted. International trains operating between Copenhagen and Hamburg (via the train ferry between Rødby and Puttgarden) also call at the station. The company Lokaltog operates a rail service to Nakskov. The railway takes the Frederick IX bridge to Lolland and the Storstrøm and Masnedsund bridges to Zealand.

There are also frequent bus services linking Nykøbing with other towns and villages on the island as well as with destinations on Lolland, Møn and Zealand.

== Cultural references ==
- Marie Grubbe, whose tragic life has been the subject of several works of art including most notably Jens Peter Jacobsen's 1876 novel published in English as Marie Grubbe. A Lady of the Seventeenth Century in 1917, spent her last years in poverty on Falster.

== Notable residents ==
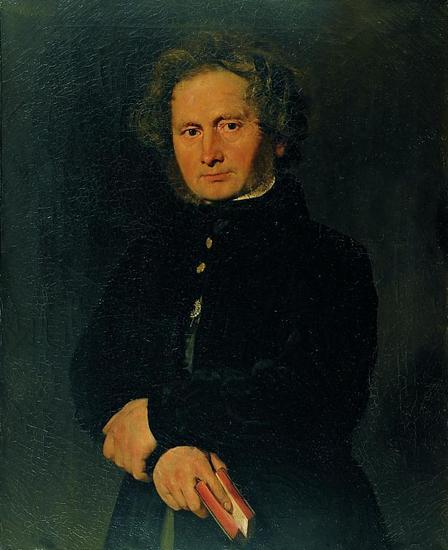
B.S. Ingemann, 1844

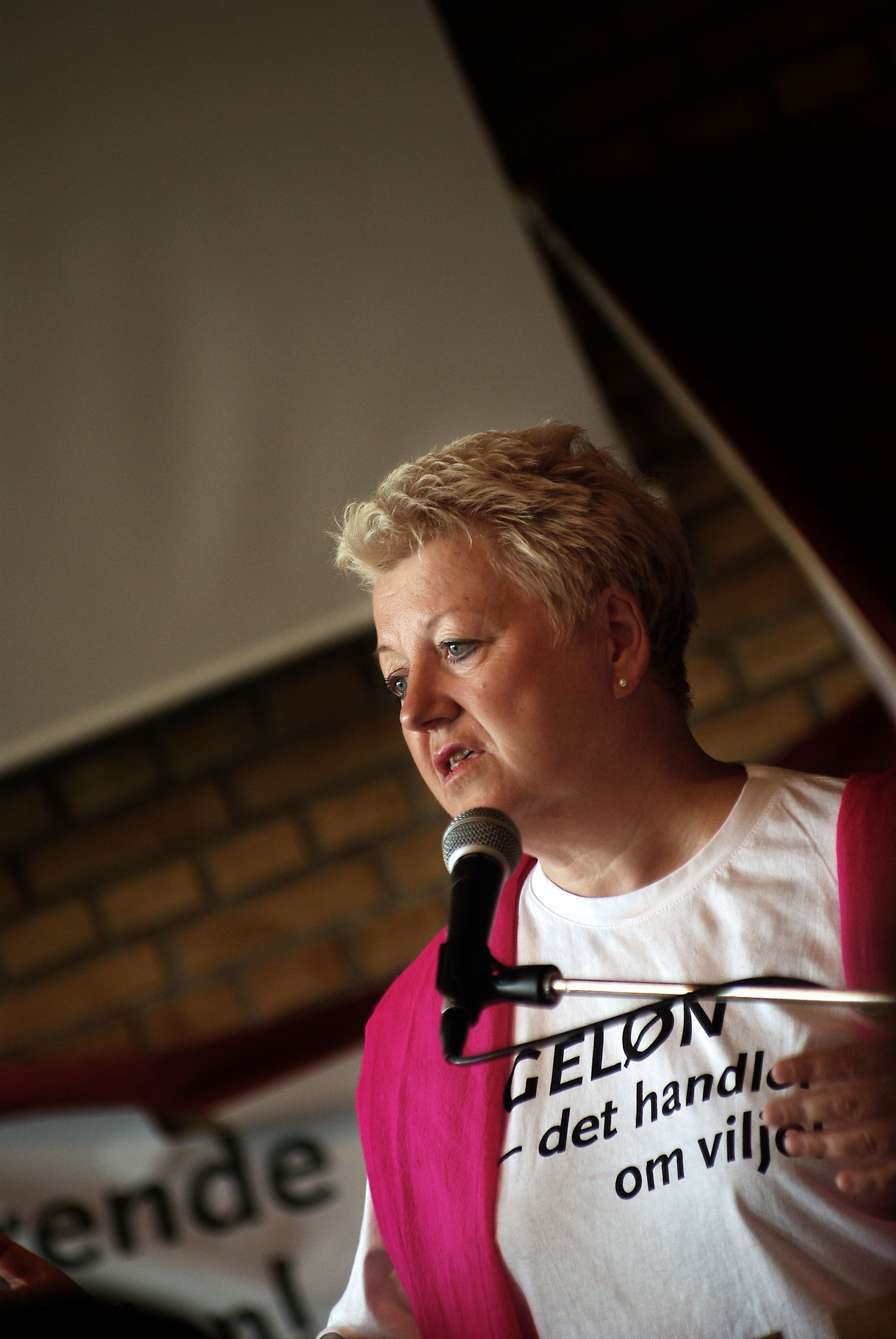
Connie Kruckow 2008

People who were born, or have lived on Falster include:

- Marie Grubbe (1643–1718), noble woman, lived Stubbekøbing
- Hans Egede (1686 - 1758 in Stubbekøbing), Lutheran missionary
- Charles August Selby (1755–1823) English-Danish merchant and landowner, built the Orupgaard manor house near Idestrup
- Bernhard Severin Ingemann (1789 in Torkilstrup – 1862), novelist and poet
- Otto Valdemar Koch (1852 in Sønder Kirkeby – 1902) architect and local politician
- Sophus Torup (1861 in Nykøbing, Falster – 1937) physiologist who settled in Norway
- Evald Nielsen (1879 in Stubbekøbing – 1958) silversmith
- Rasmus Sigvardt (1886 in Orehoved - ??) a mechanic, he opened a cycle repair shop which later developed into an engine factory
- Peter Freuchen (1886 in Nykøbing Falster - 1957), Arctic explorer, author, and anthropologist
- Peter Laurits Jensen (1886-1961) engineer, inventor, entrepreneur and invented the first loudspeaker
- Jørgen Hare (1923 in Eskilstrup – 2007) sports shooter, competed at the 1952 Summer Olympics
- Connie Kruckow (born 1953) nurse who headed The Danish Nurses' Organization
- Frederik Magle (born 1977 in Stubbekøbing), composer, organist and pianist
- Mads Rasmussen (born 1981 in Idestrup), rower

== Gallery ==
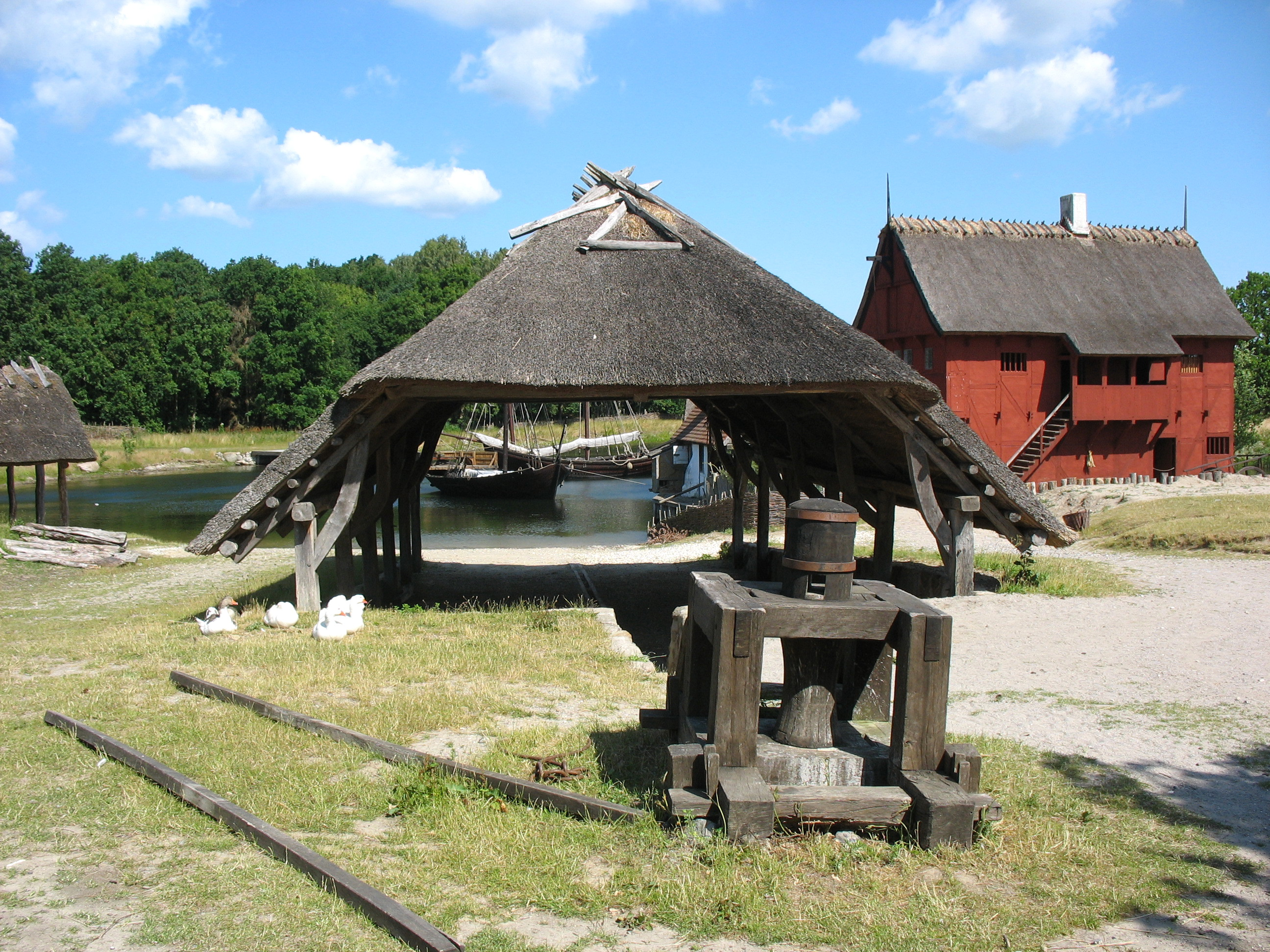
The Middle Ages Centre near Nykøbing

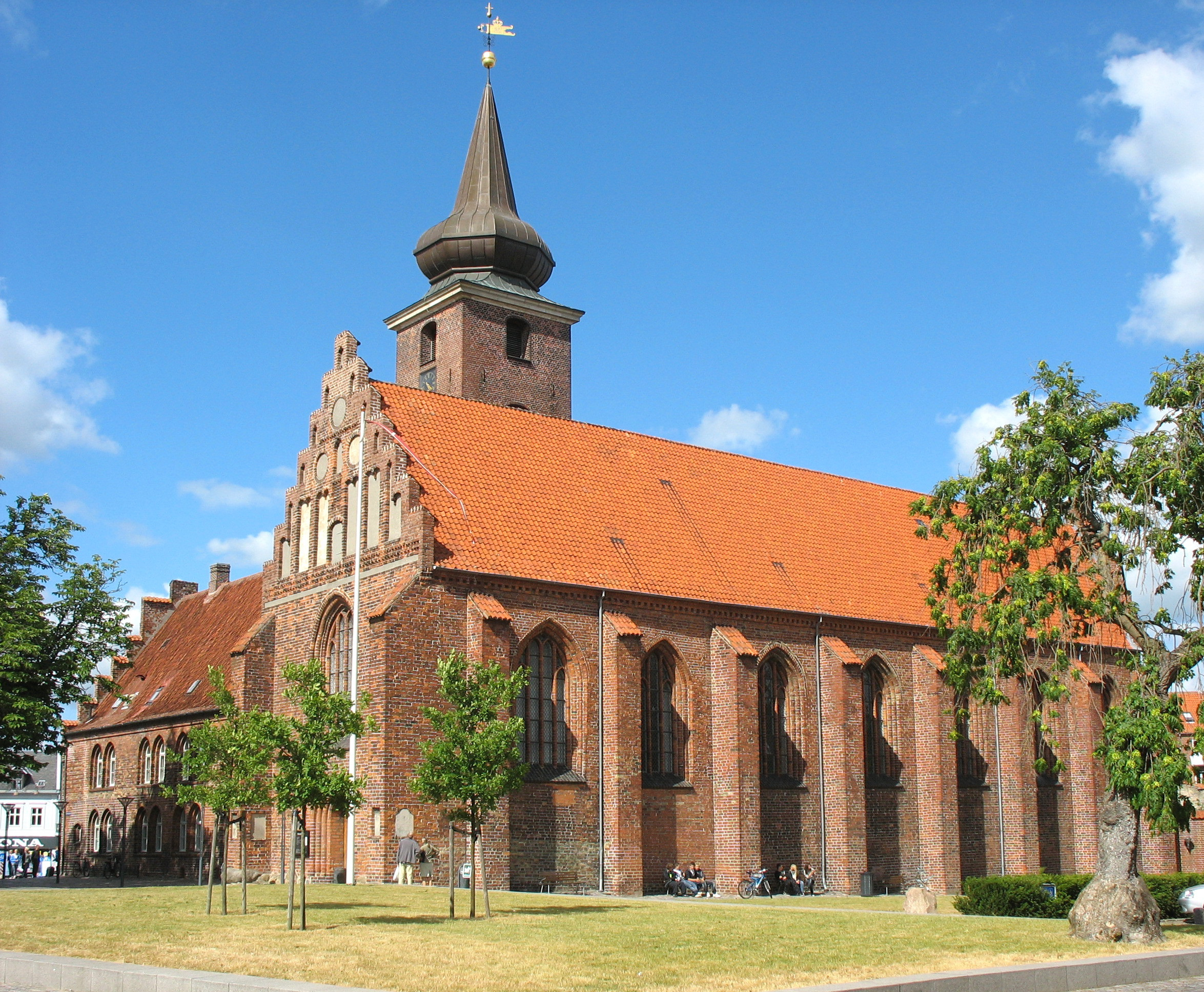
The Abbey Church in Nykøbing

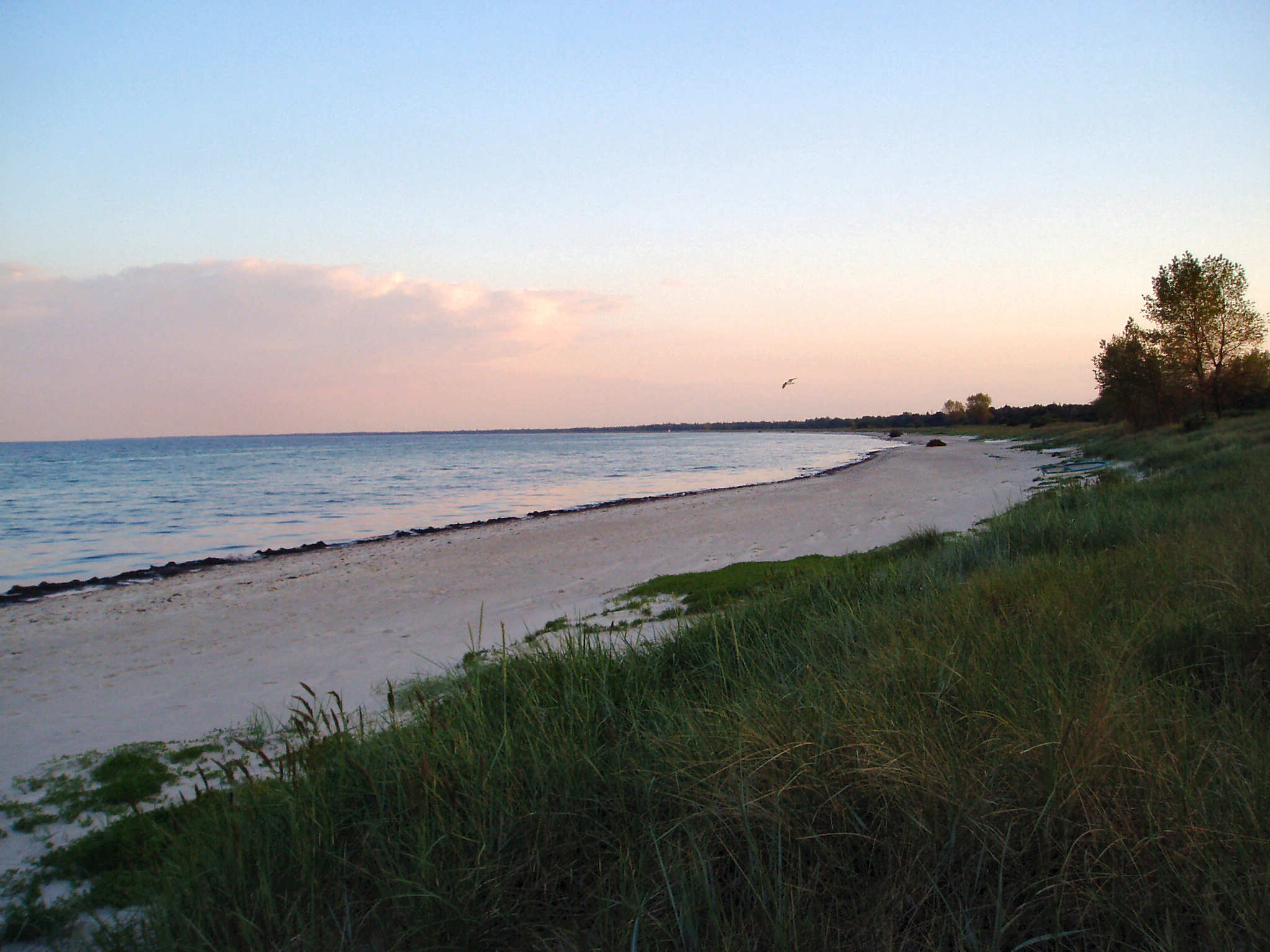
The beach at Marielyst

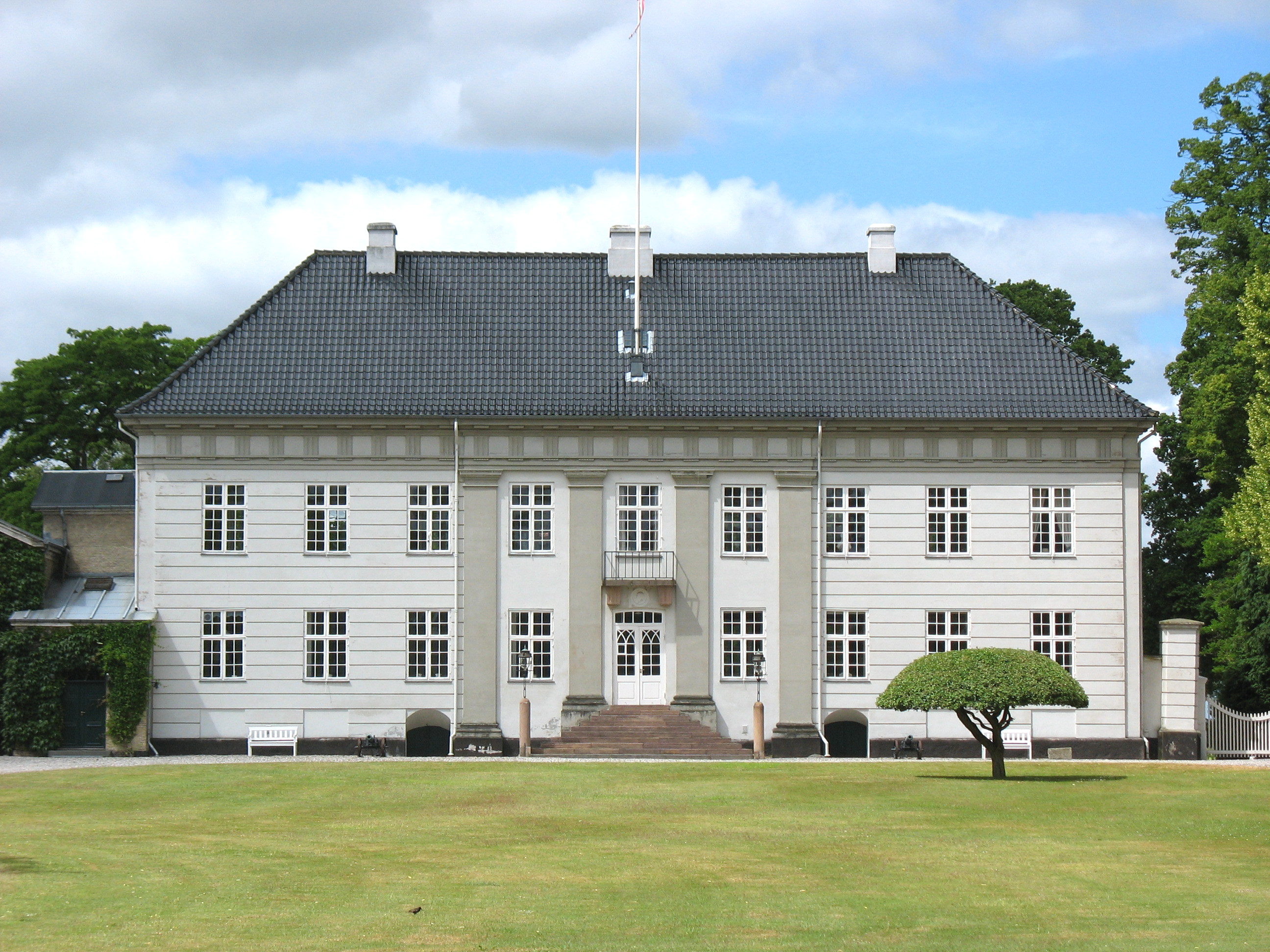
Corselitze Manor in central Falster

== See also ==
- List of islands of Denmark
- Lolland
- Langeland
- Zealand
