= Moritz Georg Moshack =

Danish musical instrument maker

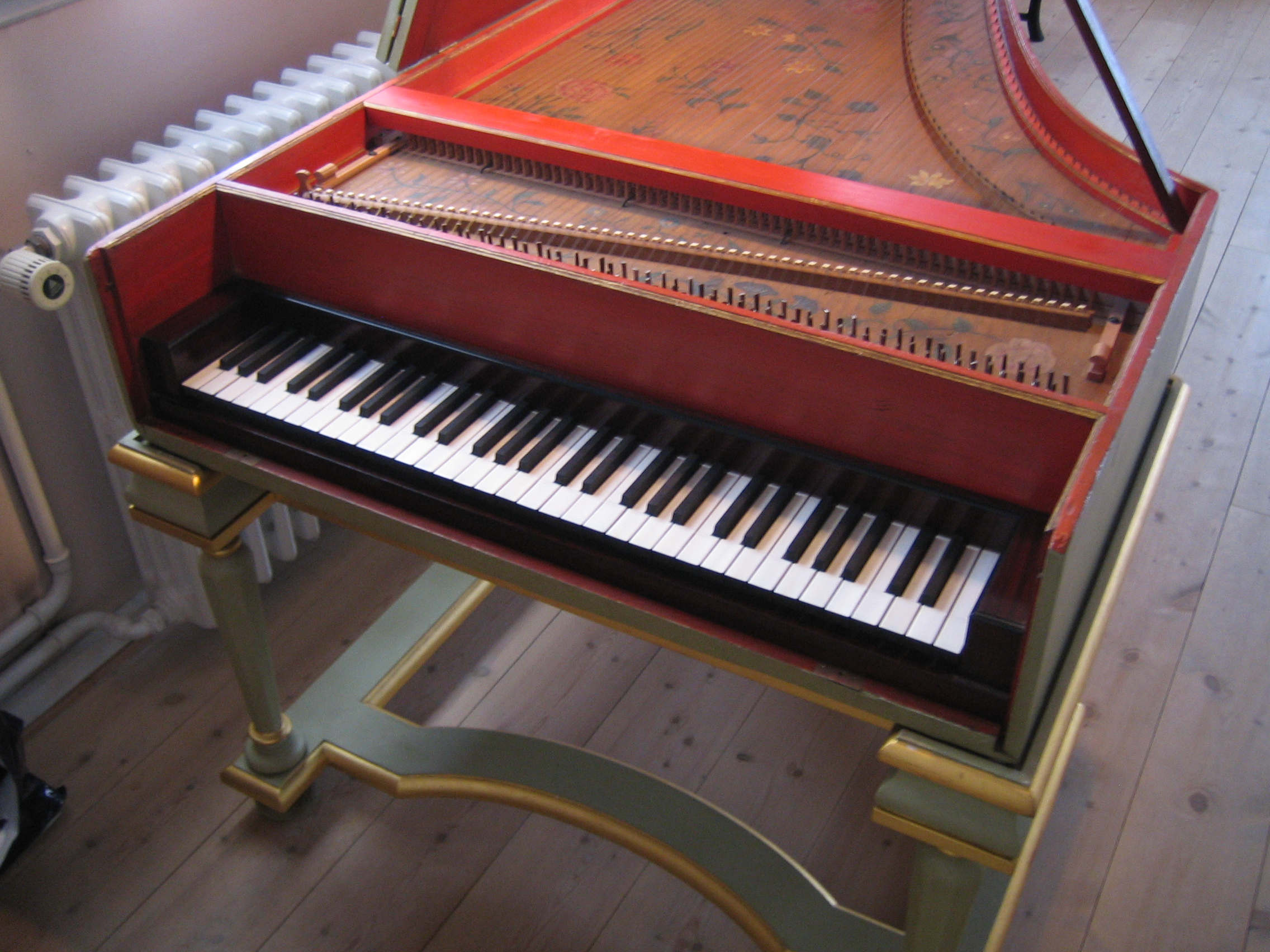
1770 harpsichord by Moshack.

Moritz Georg Moshack (1730 – before 1772) was a builder of Danish clavichords. Three of his instruments are known to exist: a fret-free clavichord dating to 1768 at the Norsk Folkemuseum, Oslo, Norway; a single manual harpsichord dating to 1770 at the Falsters Minder Museum, Nykøbing, Falster, Denmark; and the fret-free Clavichord dating to 1770 at the Danish Music Museum in Copenhagen, Denmark.

== Biography ==
Moshack became licensed in 1761. In the same year, he received a royal monopoly to build and repair clavichords, harpsichords, and organs. Between 1759 and 1772, Moshack worked in Copenhagen, building organs and other instruments. Clavichords were purchased by the Royal Danish Theatre, and other instruments by Johan Foltmar at Trinitatis Church. Moshack also worked as a tuner.
