= Mecklenburg Ancestral Table =

Illustrated 17th-century genealogical table

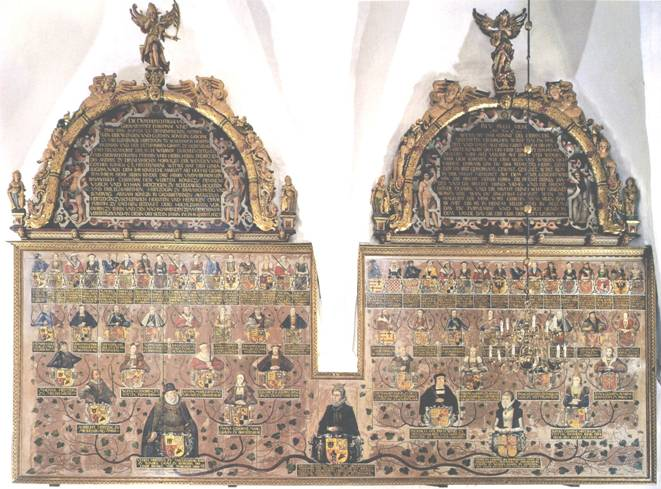
- Year: 1627
- Location: Denmark

The Mecklenburg Ancestral Table (Danish: den Mecklenburgske anetavle) is an illustrated 17th-century genealogical table of 63 ancestors of Queen Sophie of Denmark (1557–1631). It hangs in the Abbey Church in Nykøbing on the Danish island of Falster.

== Description ==
Queen Sophie's genealogical table was the work of Antonius Clement from Odense. It was donated by the queen to Nykøbing's Abbey Church. Evert Decker, Clement's closest pupil, began the work in 1622, receiving a partial fee of 500 courant daler in 1624. The table, however, was not completed until 1626 when Frantz Kraeg received payment for the upper sections, one of which bears the date of fitting, 1627.

The table consists of boards of oak (top sections in pine) which are arranged into two halves. Its surface, covering 33 m^{2} (360 sq ft) is painted with oils on a chalk base. It shows Queen Sophie (in the centre below the two halves) with five generations of her ancestors, 63 in all, with half-length portraits, coats-of-arms and name plates. Each row covers a generation with the queen's paternal relatives on the right and the maternal ancestors on the left.

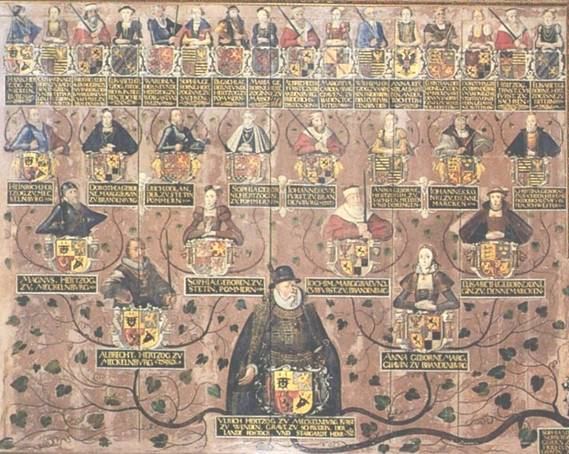
Antonius Clement: Mecklenburg ancestral table, detail of paternal ancestors

The value of the images as portraits is however limited to the closest family members, especially those of the queen dowager herself and her parents, which are considered reliable portrayals. By contrast, those of the older generations are imaginative works, often wearing equally imaginative clothing. Inscriptions are in gilded capitals on a dark background. The frame is in the Auricular style with putti and angels. On the cornice below, there are small female figures representing the virtues. Both the upper sections are crowned with angels, one blowing a bassoon, the other waving a palm branch. The German inscription at the top states (in summary):

Sophie, Queen of Denmark, Frederik II's widow, has had this table drawn up and installed in the year 1627 in honour of her parents and for the memory of her descendants, after giving birth with the same lordly highness to seven children, Christian IV, King of Denmark, Ulrich and Johan, Dukes of Schleswig Holstein, and Elisabeth, Duchess of Braunschweig and Lüneburg, Anne, Queen of Great Britain, Augusta, Duchess of Schleswig Holstein and Hedvig, Electress of Saxony.

The table has been restored on several occasions, most recently in 1943 by N. H. Termansen. Cracks were repaired and the original base tone was revealed after being completely covered over during an earlier restoration, probably that of 1874. The table hangs on the church's north wall, on a U-shaped iron support.
