= Ingeborg Tolderlund =

Danish women's rights activist and suffragist

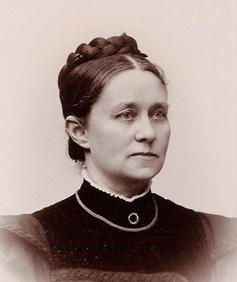
Ingeborg Tolderlund

Anna Ingeborg Caroline Tolderlund née Møller (1848–1935) was a Danish women's rights activist and suffragist. On behalf of the Danish Women's Society, in 1906 she established a local chapter in her native Thisted in the north of Jutland which she chaired until 1927. She is also remembered for her support of Thisted's music association (Thisted Musikforening) which she headed for almost 20 years.

== Early life and family ==
Born on 21 January 1848 in Nykøbing Falster, Anna Ingeborg Caroline Møller was the daughter of Lorents Conrad Møller (1807–66) and Johanne Marie Elisabeth Schrader (born 1812). When she was four, she moved with her parents and elder sister to Copenhagen where she was raised in a well-to-do environment rich in cultural and political contacts. In 1874, she married her cousin Lorentz Conrad Møller, a physician, and moved with him to Thisted. After his early death, she married another physician, Julius Christopher Tolderlund.

== Professional life ==
Rather than raising children, she devoted her energy to cultural and political activities, inviting leading figures to her home where she organized concerts and meetings. She took a special interest in women's emancipation, lecturing on famous Danish women such as Leonora Christina. In 1901, she helped found the local music association which she chaired from 1907 for almost 20 years. An able pianist herself, she did her utmost to invite outstanding performers, sometimes acting as an accompanist.

Her interest in the women's movement began before the turn of the century. In 1906, she established a local branch of the Danish Women's Society in Thisted, prioritizing women's voting rights and eligibility. From 1909, she was a board member of the Women's Society itself, helping to establish additional branches in the north of Jutland. When Danish women were given the vote in 1915, she planted the so-called Women's Oak at Sjørring Vold to the west of the city. She was an active member of the Conservative electoral association and was a candidate in the 1918 elections but was not successful.

Ingeborg Tolderlund died in Thisted on 17 January 1935. She is buried in Thisted's Søndre Kirkegaard.
