= Abbey Church, Nykøbing Falster =

Coordinates: 54°45′56″N 11°52′10″E

Abbey Church
- Nykøbing Church
- Klosterkirken
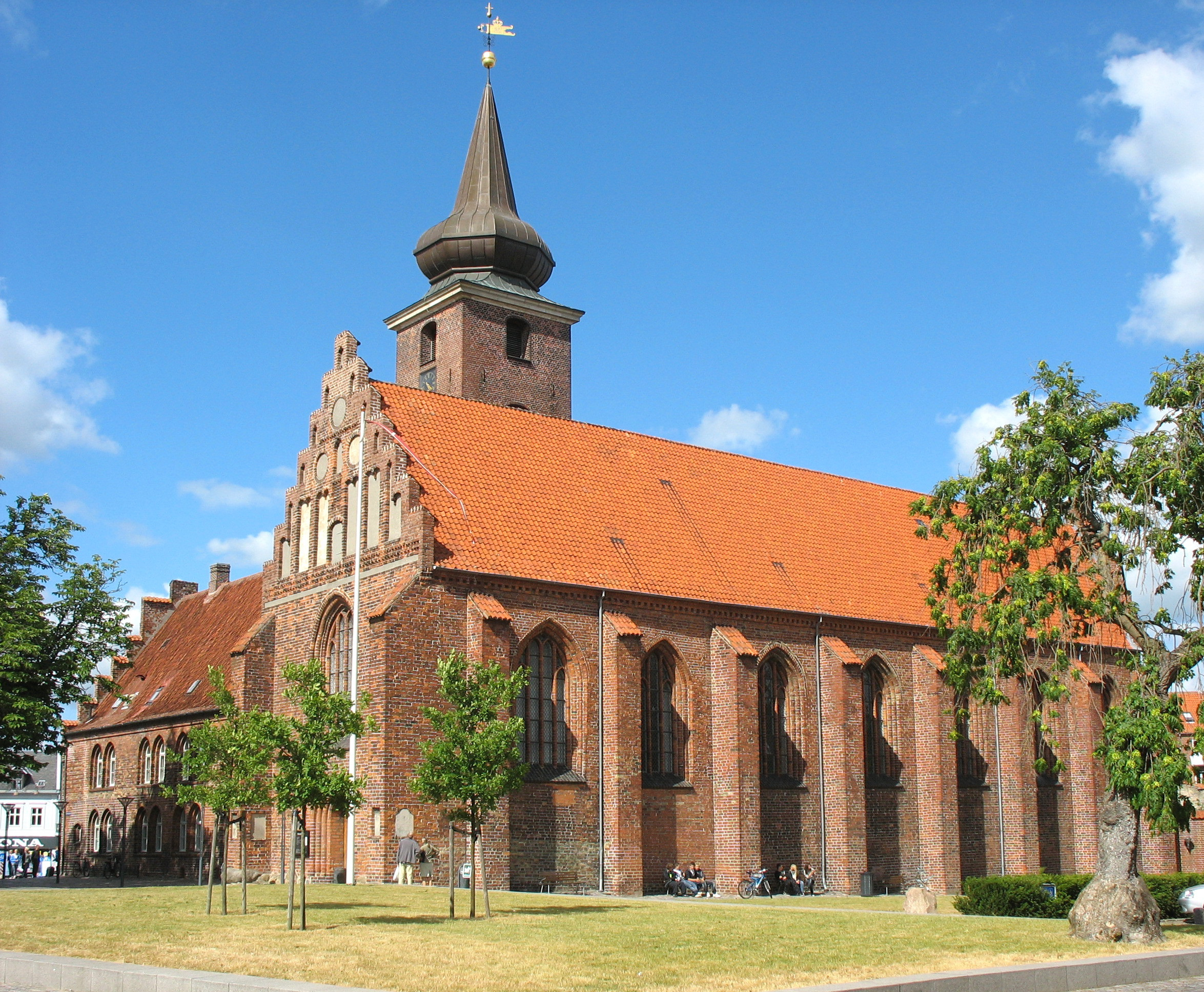
- Abbey Church
- Location: Nykøbing, Falster
- Denomination: Church of Denmark

Architecture
- Architectural type: Gothic architecture
- Completed: 1419

Administration
- Diocese: Diocese of Lolland–Falster
- Deanery: Falster Provsti
- Parish: Nykøbing F Sogn

The Abbey Church (Danish: Klosterkirken), also known as Nykøbing Church, in Nykøbing on the Danish island of Falster is a church in the Gothic style from the 15th century. Its origins go back to 1419 when Eric of Pomerania, king of the Nordic Kalmar Union, established a Franciscan monastery. One of its treasures is the Mecklenburg Ancestral Table (1627) presenting the ancestors of the dowager Queen Sophie.

== History ==
The first historical reference is to St Nicholas Chapel where Eric of Pomerania founded a Greyfriars monastery in honour of Our Lady, St Michael and St Francis. The church must have been completed by 1482 when the annual Franciscan chapter meeting was held in Nykøbing to celebrate the 300th anniversary of the birth of Francis of Assisi with representatives of Franciscan communities in the Nordic countries. In 1532, when the monks had left the abbey, the church was transferred to the citizens of Nykøbing as the parish church. In the 16th and 17th centuries, the church had close connections with Nykøbing Castle (now demolished) which became the residence of Denmark's dowager queens.

== Geography ==
The church lies close to the southern limit of the town as, in the Middle Ages, it was on relatively high ground. It formed the south wing of the Franciscan abbey's four wings of which, in addition to the church, only the significantly reworked west wing remains. Private houses grew up around the church until they were cleared after a workshop fire around 1900.

== Architecture and fittings ==
The church consists of a nave with a three-sided east gable, a tower on the north side and a cloister (now part of an aisle inside the church), along the south side, all built in red brick in the Late Gothic style. Apart from the church, only the west wing and a small part of the north wing of the abbey have been preserved. The west wing was built over several periods. The part next to the church is the oldest, possibly the first part of the abbey to be built, and certainly older than the church. This explains why the adjacent church windows are of different sizes and more profiled than those in the rest of the church. The church's long eastern section was constructed over two periods. From its style, which is similar to that of the east gable, it can be seen that the west gable was constructed at a later stage. The tower was built over three periods, the cloister over four periods. The style of architecture indicates all the basic construction work was completed by about 1500. The tower was heightened in 1766 and topped with today's onion spire. There are three bells in the tower. The oldest bell was cast in 1477? by Johannes Nicolai. The next one was cast in 1493 by Anonym. The newest bell was cast in 1634 by Michel Westphal. There are a bell from the 14th century cast by Magister Gherard in a niche in the north gable of the west wing. The carillon of 26 bells from 1969 comes from Petit & Fritsen in the Netherlands.

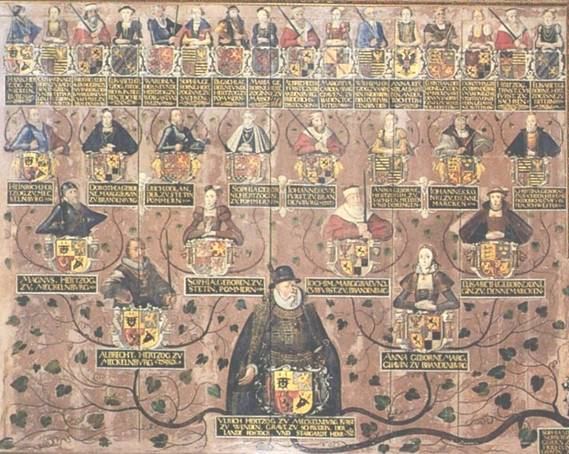
Part of the Mecklenburg ancestral table (1627)

=== Interior ===
The lower level of today's aisle was connected to the church by a doorway but later three round arches were completed. They were perfected during the restoration work in 1874 when the gallery was given its pointed twin openings. In 1966, the pulpit was moved closer to the chancel.

The elaborate altarpiece from 1616 is in the Renaissance style with paintings from Antonius Clement's workshop in Odense depicting the Crucifixion in the central panel flanked by Isaac's Sacrifice and the Snake in the Desert. The pulpit (1640) in the Auricular style is the work of Jørgen Ringnis who crafted several carved pulpits for Falster churches. Features include Moses with the Tablets of Law, and shell-framed niches with the four Evangelists. The artistic Mecklenburg Ancestral Table on which Antonius Clement started to work in 1622, completing it in 1627, shows 63 of Queen Sophie's ancestors from five generations with small paintings of each. The octagonal bronze font (1648) is designed by Antony Wisse from Lübeck. The crucifix on the north wall is from 1646.

== Grounds ==
Christopher Herfordt of Copenhagen received permission in 1665 to erect a burial compound on the south side of the church. Later known as Herfordt's Chapel, the brick structure is reported to have been covered with a half-roof and enclosed with wrought-iron railings. The sacristy, first mentioned in 1720, was a small half-timbered building but was removed in 1874 during restoration work. In 1847, after a newly designed cemetery was opened elsewhere, the churchyard simply became an annex. It was later transformed into the area called Rosenhaven (The Rose Garden) consisting of a flower garden and a car park. At its southern end there is a tombstone commemorating the statesman and bishop Ditlev Gothard Monrad (1811–1877) and his wife. It came from another cemetery which was closed in favour of a railway bridge. In 1967, the iron gate which stood at the western end of the churchyard was moved to the south entrance near the church's eastern wall. Crafted by the ironsmith T. C. Christoffersen in 1901, the gate was designed by the architect Henrik Christopher Glahn.

== Gallery ==
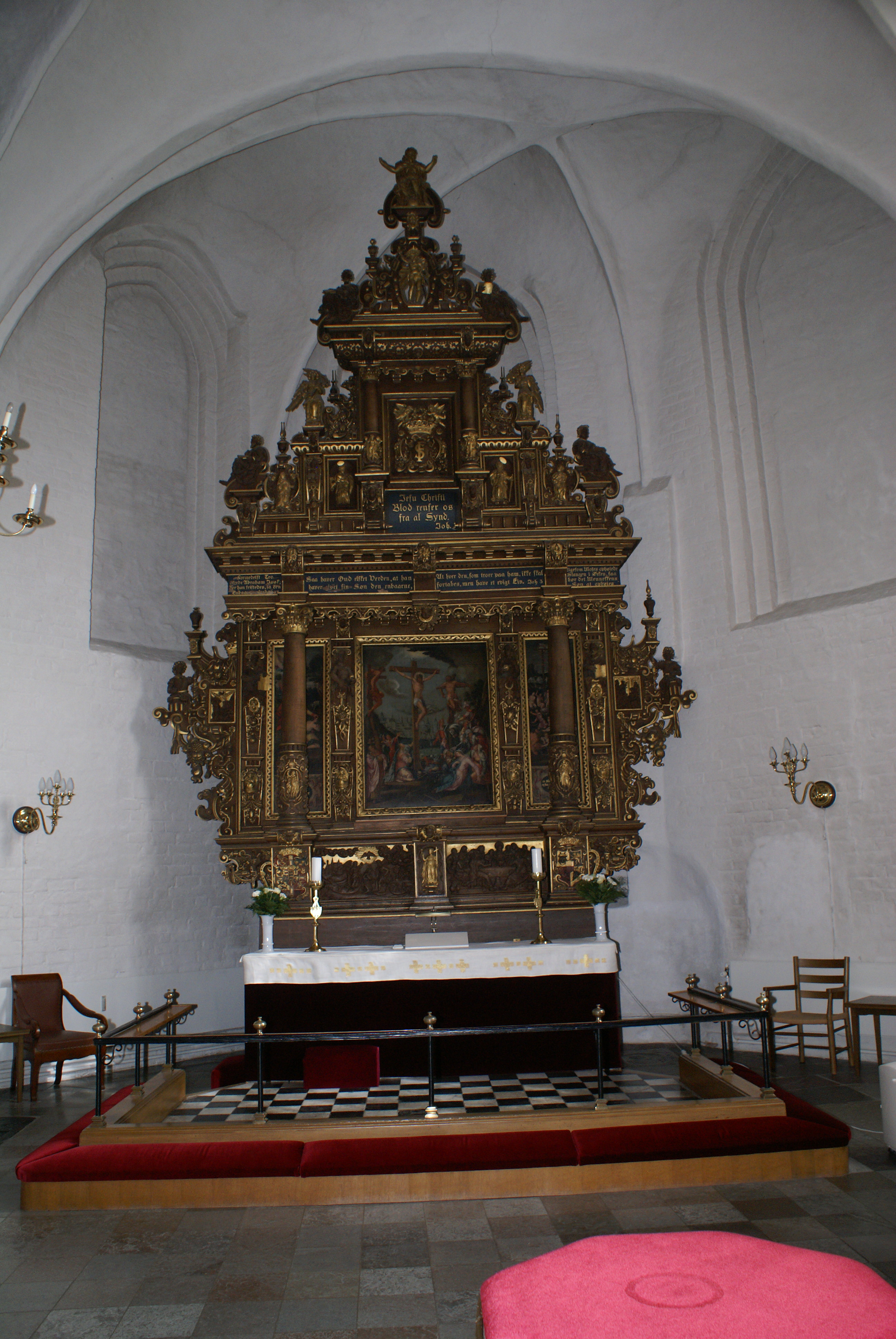
The altarpiece (1616)

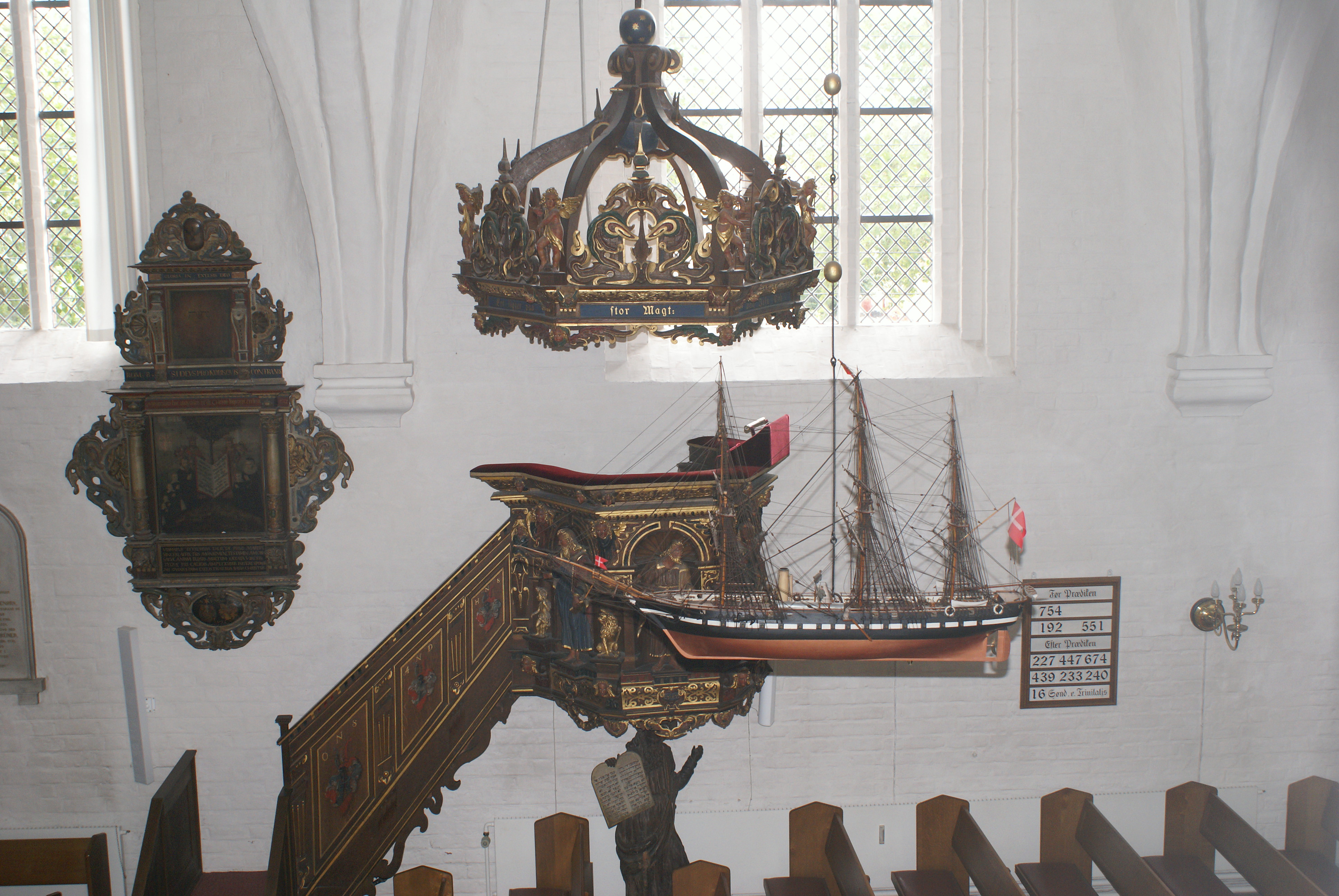
The pulpit (1640)

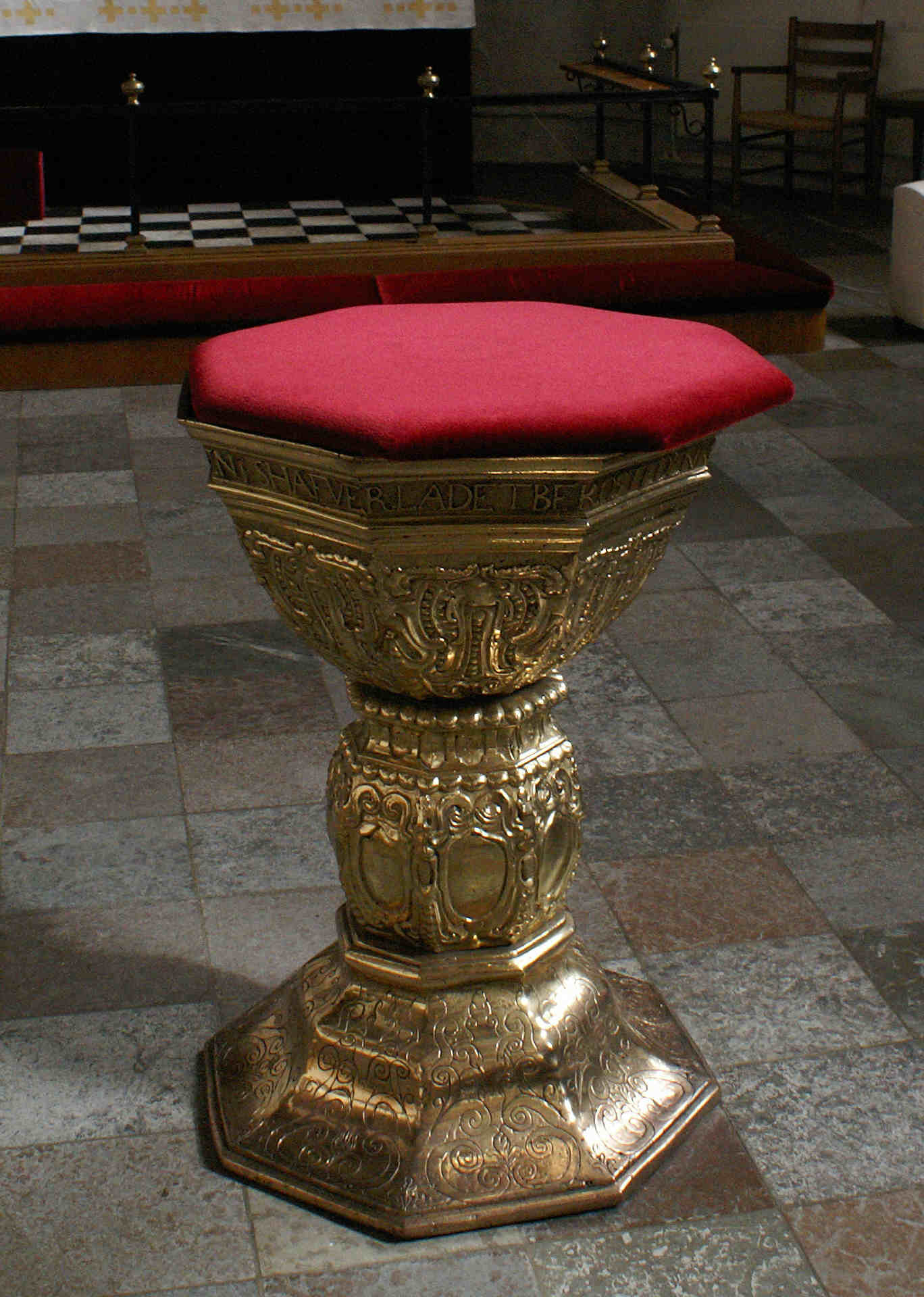
Bronze font (1648)
