= Falsters Minder =

City museum of Nykøbing on the Danish island of Falster

Coordinates: 54°46′05″N 11°52′01″E

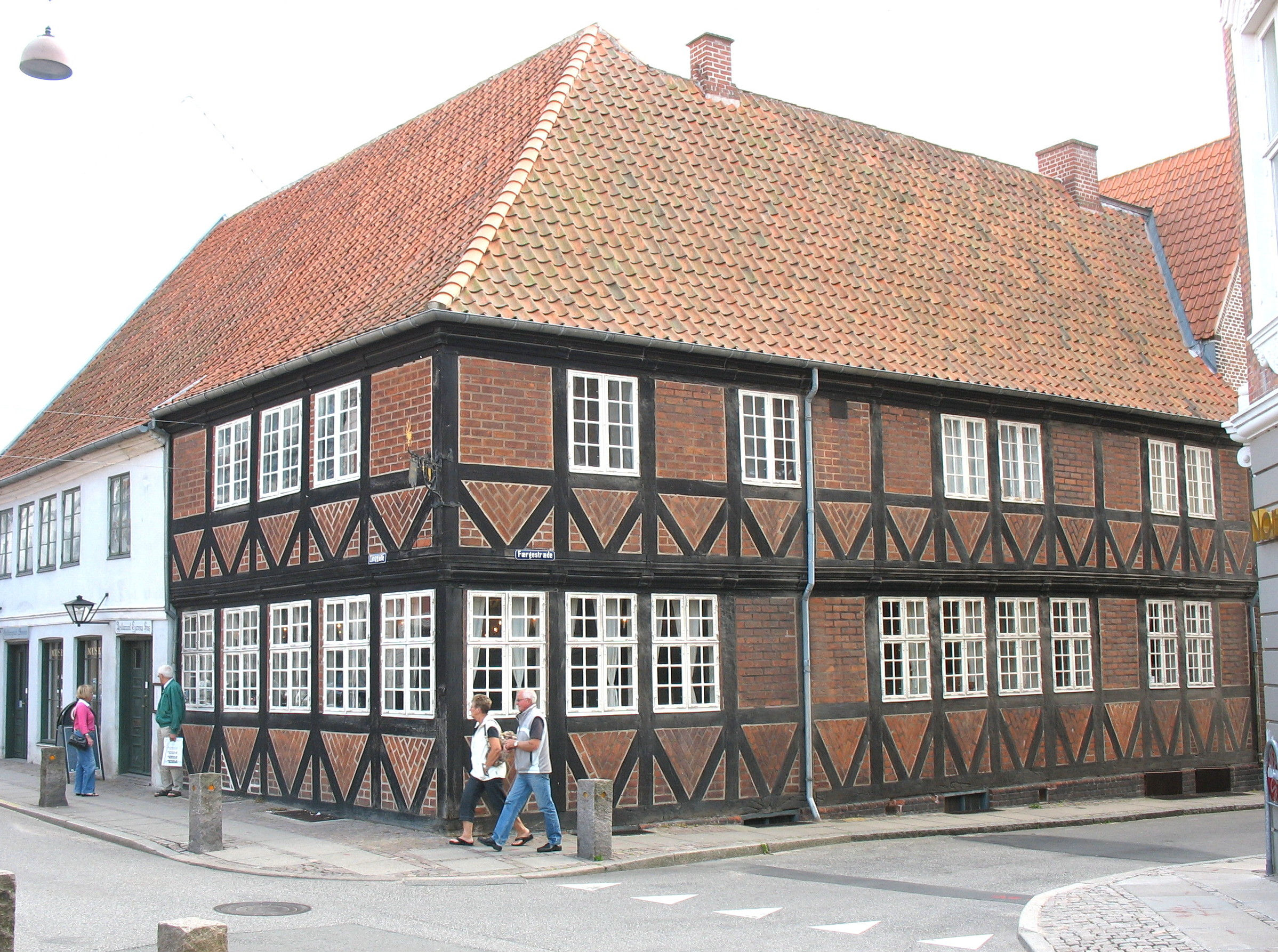
Czarens Hus, Nykøbing Falster

Falsters Minder (literally Falster's Memories) is the city museum of Nykøbing on the Danish island of Falster. It is housed in the 17th century half-timbered building known as Czarens Hus (the Czar's House).

== History ==
Czarens Hus is one of Nykøbing's oldest buildings, dating from the 1690s. The main entrance, now the museum entrance, used to be through the even older half-timbered Kragsnaps Hus. Archeological investigations and old maps show that the corner of Langgade and Færgestræde has been inhabited since the 13th century. It served area farmers and merchants both as a supplies store and a guest house.

The earliest known owner of the building was Ivar Rosenfeldt, a postmaster, who operated an inn from 1697. During the Great Northern War at the beginning of the 18th century, Frederik IV allied himself with Peter the Great, Czar of Russia, who made his fleet available for Frederik's intended landing in Scania. It was while the fleet was anchored in Copenhagen that the czar visited Nykøbing in July 1716. Known for his rather unorthodox ways, Peter the Great chose to dine in Rosenfeldt's inn (one source states he lived in Czarens Hus), rather than with the court at Nykøbing Castle. Ever since, the building has been known as Czarens Hus. Today it still operates as a restaurant in authentic surroundings.

Henrik Christoffer Glahn (1850–1931) restored Czarens Hus in 1899. It was also Glahn who in 1883 designed the goldsmith's shop at 19, Langgade which in 1963 became one of the shop exhibits in the museum. Lunch and dinner are still served in Czarens Hus, its restaurant decor featuring chandeliers, green walls, and golden trimmings.

== Museum ==
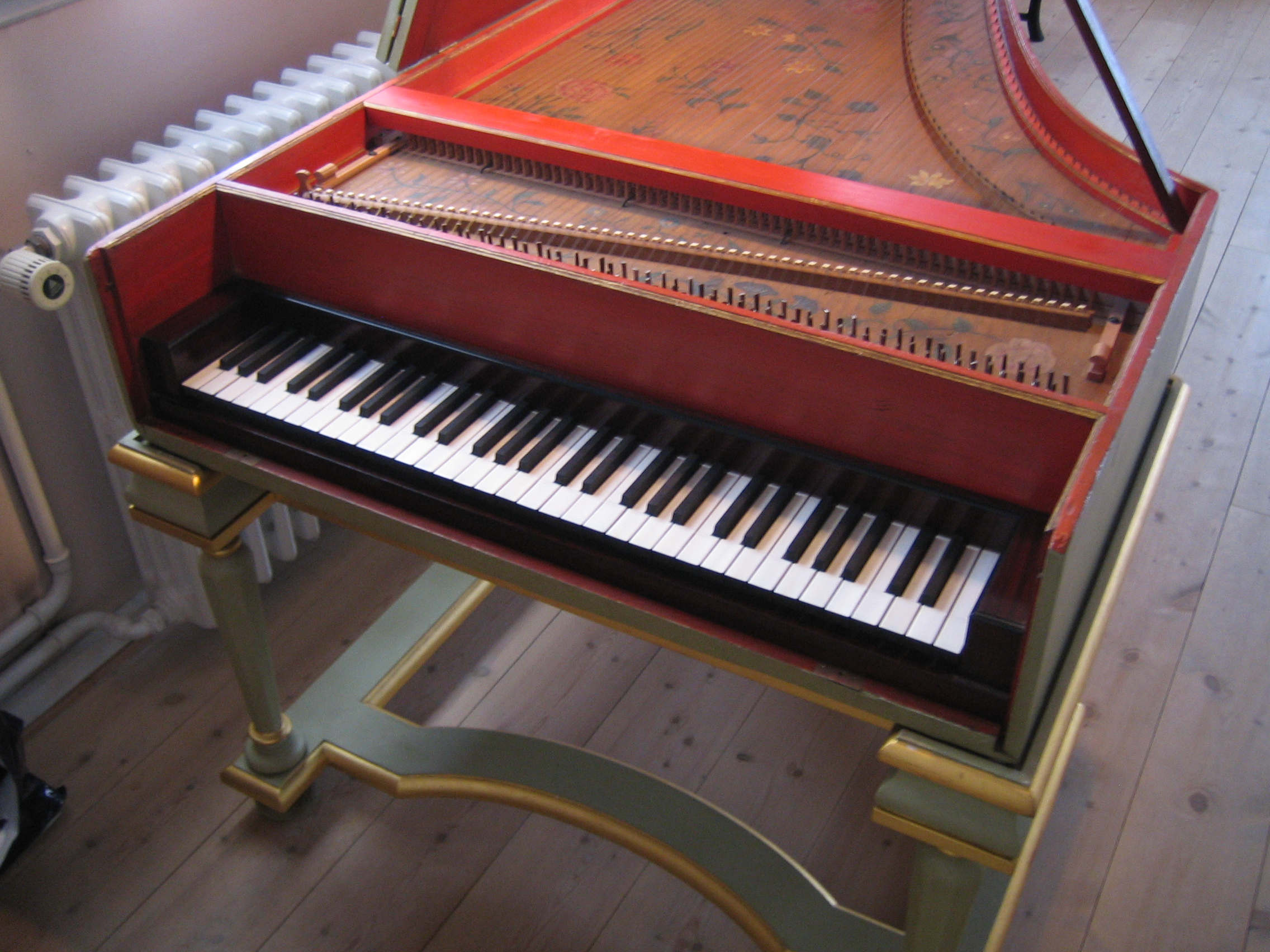
The 1770 harpsichord of Moritz Georg Moshack.

Inaugurated in 1923 on the corner of Færgetrædet and Langgade, the museum was extended to Kragsnapshuset in the 1980s. Its collection covers the history of Nykøbing from the very beginnings (some 14,000 years ago) to the present day with an emphasis on artefacts from the 19th and 20th centuries. A 1770 harpsichord built by Moritz Georg Moshack, one of the most notable Danish harpsichord producers, is included, as are toys, china, glass, and a Viking torc. There is a recent exhibit showing Falster's position in the Middle Ages. The features of Nykøbing Castle (now demolished) can be seen from a well crafted model. Costumes from both town and country can be seen as well as a variety of rooms, including a fully furnished bedroom from around the year 1900, a farmhouse interior and a goldsmith's shop and workshop. The museum's shop is designed to represent a local grocery store from the first half of the 20th century.

The archaeologist Peter Vemming Hansen has been a researcher with the museum, while curators have included F. Nabe-Nielsen and the archaeologist Anna-Elisabeth Jensen.
