= Isaac Salmonsen =

Danish bookseller and publisher

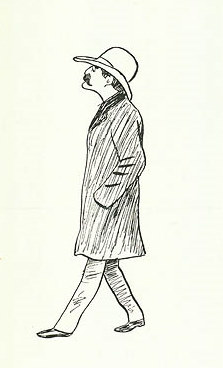
- Born: 1846
- Died: 1910 (aged 63–64)
- Occupations: Bookseller and publisher
- Known for: Salmonsens Konversationsleksikon

Isaac Salmonsen (1846 – 1910) was a Danish bookseller and publisher.

He established the publishing house Brødrene Salmonsen in 1871, along with his brother. He is particularly known for publishing the Danish encyclopedia, Salmonsens Store Illustrerede Konversationsleksikon. The first edition of the encyclopedia came in nineteen volumes between 1893 and 1911. The second edition of the encyclopedia came in twenty-six volumes between 1915 and 1930.
