= Salmonsens Konversationsleksikon =

Danish encyclopedic dictionary

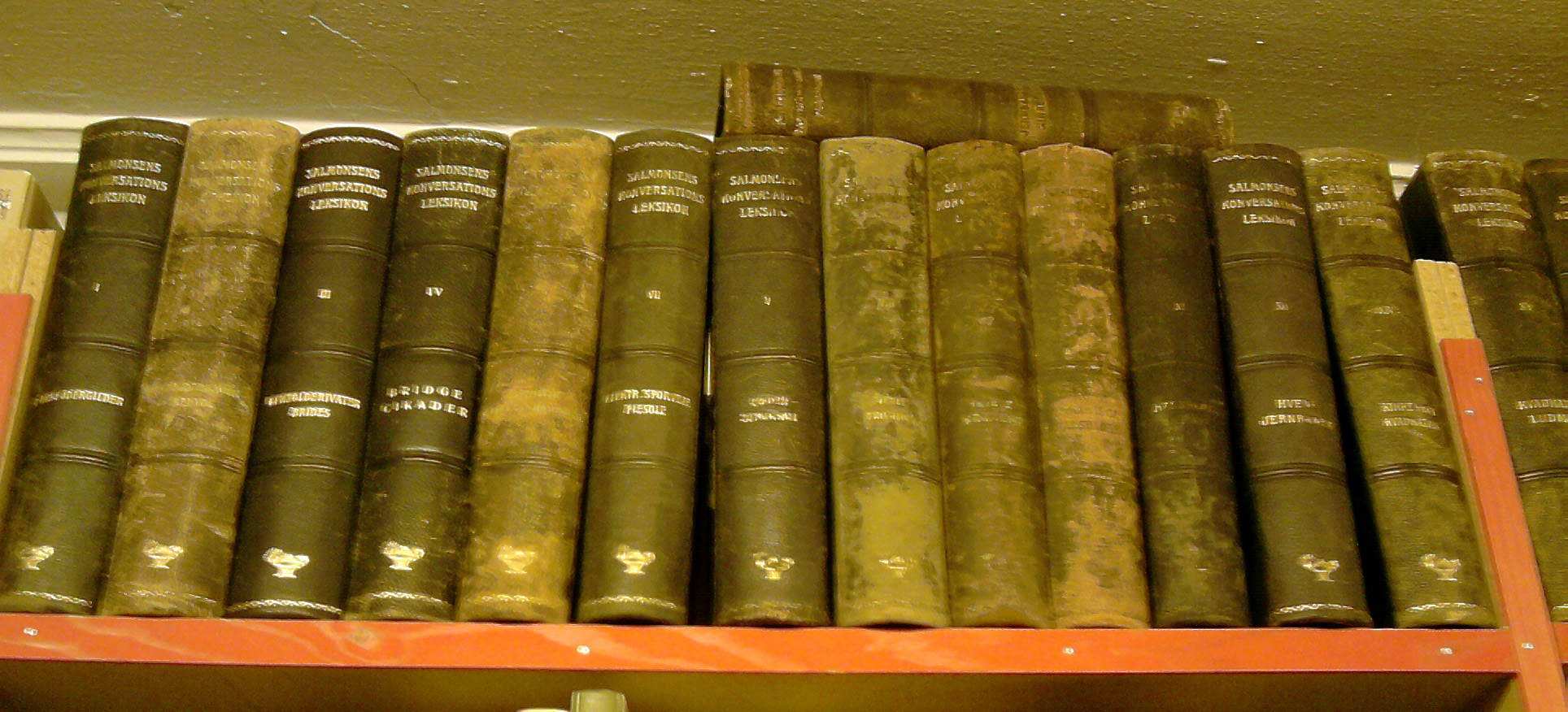
Volumes from the second edition of Salmonsens Konversationsleksikon (1915–1930). Volumes of the second edition often display an uneven appearance due to an inferior quality of leather used during World War I.

Salmonsens Konversationsleksikon is a Danish encyclopedia that has been published in several editions.

The first edition, Salmonsens Store Illustrerede Konversationsleksikon was published in nineteen volumes 1893–1911 by Brødrene Salmonsens Forlag, and named after the publisher Isaac Salmonsen. The second edition, Salmonsens Konversationsleksikon, was published in 26 volumes 1915–1930, under the editorship of Christian Blangstrup (volume 1–21), and Johannes Brøndum-Nielsen and Palle Raunkjær (volume 22–26), issued by J. H. Schultz Forlagsboghandel.

== Editions ==
- Salmonsens Store Illustrerede Konversationsleksikon, 19 volumes, Copenhagen: Brødrene Salmonsen, 1893–1911
- Salmonsens Konversationsleksikon, 2nd edition, editors: Christian Blangstrup (I–XXI), Johannes Brøndum-Nielsen and Palle Raunkjær (XXII–XXVI), 26 volumes, Copenhagen: J. H. Schultz Forlagsboghandel, 1915–1930.
- Den Lille Salmonsen, 3rd edition, 12 volumes, Copenhagen, 1937–1940.
- Salmonsen Leksikon-Tidsskrift (SLT), Copenhagen, 1941–1955. A series of booklets issued monthly.
- Den nye Salmonsen, 1 volume, Copenhagen, 1949.

== See also ==
- List of Danish online encyclopedic resources
