= Christian Blangstrup =

Danish encyclopedist

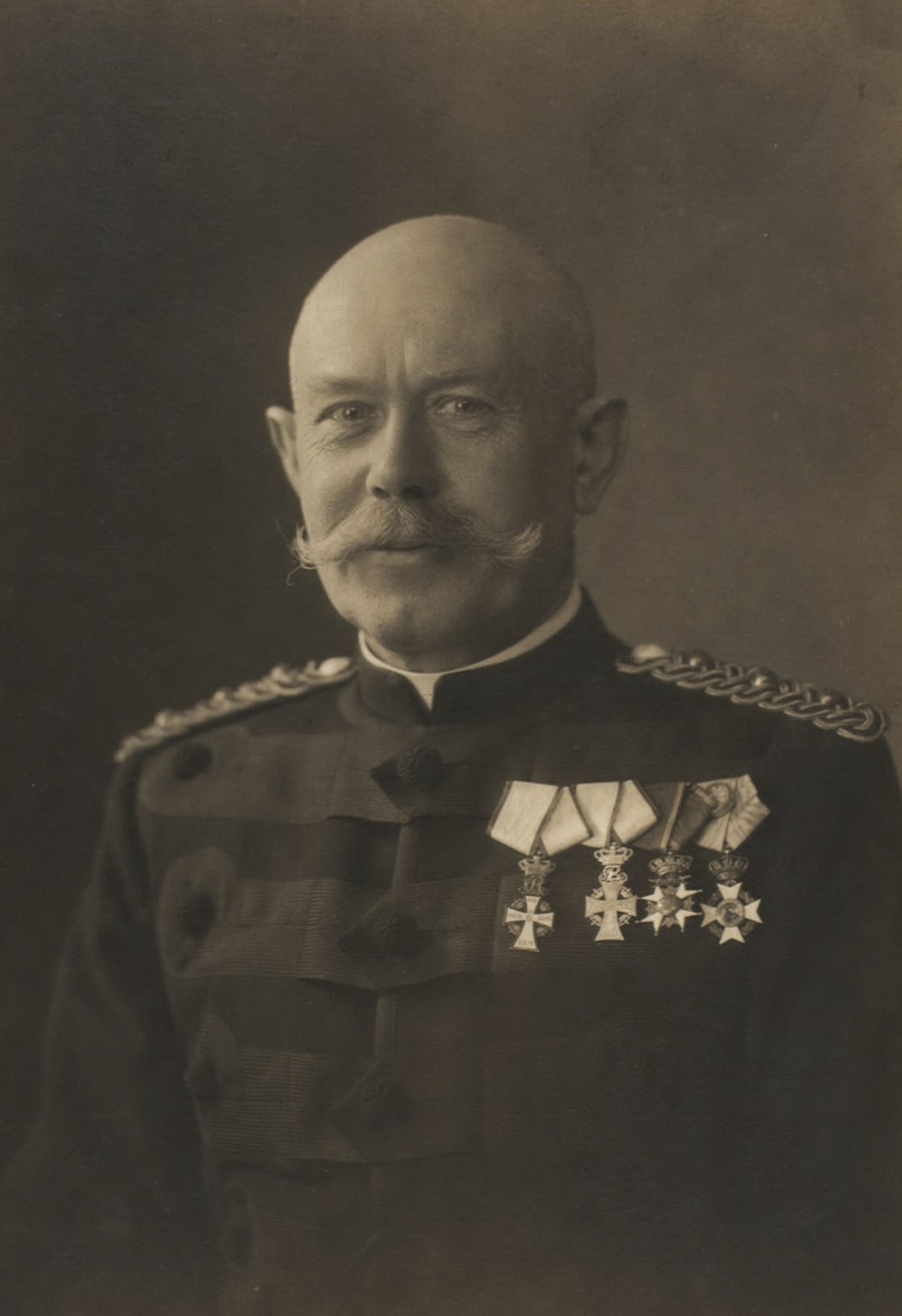
Christian Blangstrup

Christian Blangstrup (29 October 1857, Nykøbing Falster – 1926) was a Danish encyclopedist. Born in Nykjobing, he was editor-in-chief of the Danish newspaper Berlingske Tidende from 1902 to 1912. He later edited the volumes 1–21 of the second edition of the Danish encyclopedia Salmonsens Konversationsleksikon.
