= Ejegod Windmill =

Smock mill on the Danish island of Falster

Coordinates: 54°46′49″N 11°51′55″E

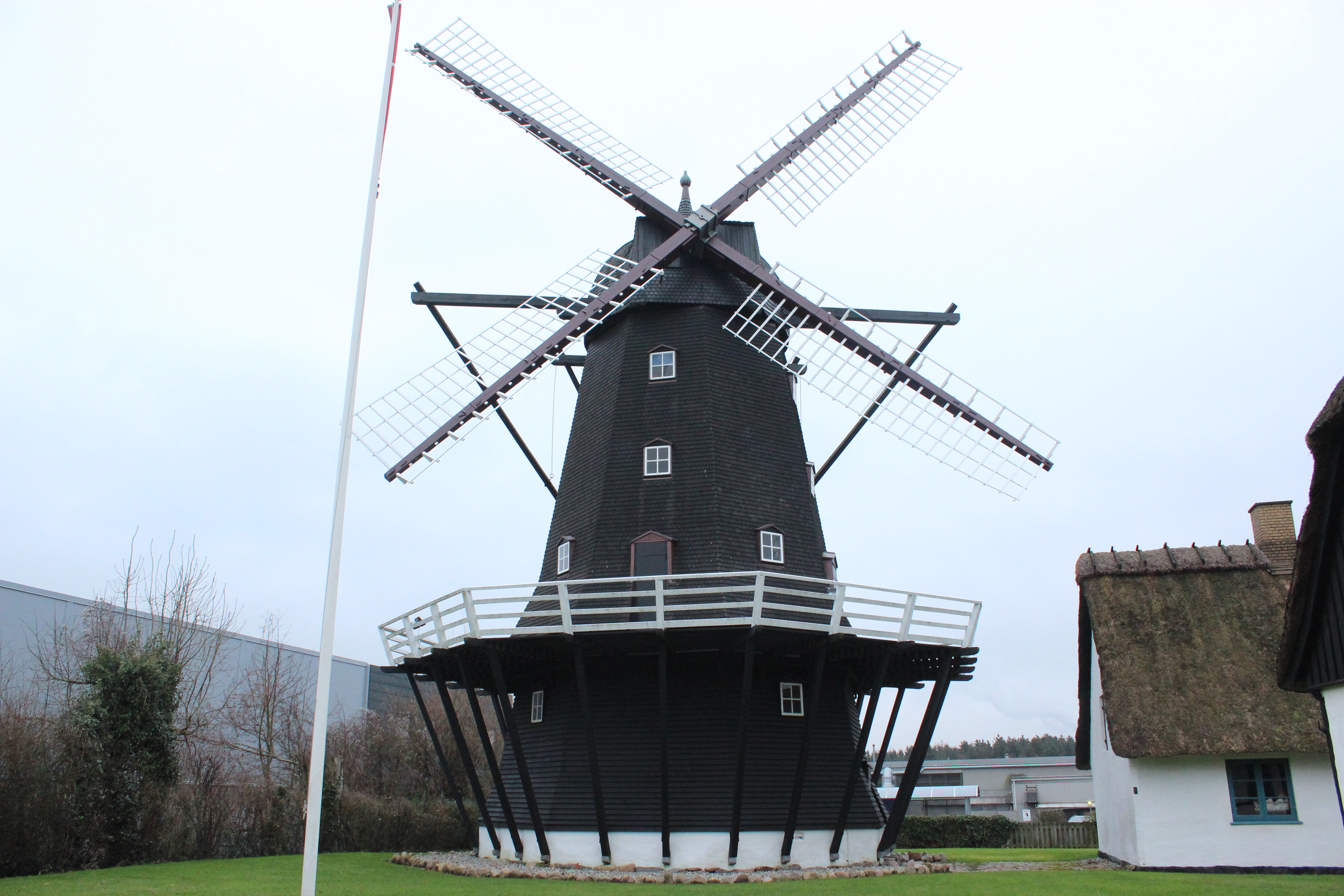
Ejegod Mølle

Ejegod Windmill (Danish: Ejegod Mølle) is a smock mill located in the north of Nykøbing on the Danish island of Falster. The exterior was fully restored in 2002–2010. A toy museum was established within the old mill house in 2009s.

== Description ==
The octagonal tower with a gallery stands on a foundation of masonry and fieldstone. The brick-built section below the gallery is faced with planks while the upper section is clad in shingles like the ogee cap. It has automatic sails with a manual yaw.

== History ==
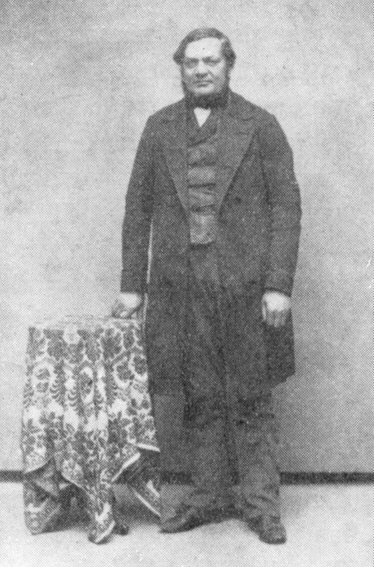
Jens Nicolai Jappe, a miller at Ejegod

The mill was built in 1816 for the farm Ejegod (now demolished) by the diplomat Michael Classen, a cousin of Johan Frederik Classen of nearby Corselitze. The following year, the mill and the neighbouring miller's house were insured against fire. The thatched warehouse immediately south of the mill is first mentioned in 1830.

The mill was operated by copyholders, among whom was Jens Nicolai Jappe who came from a family of millers. The mill started to run into hard times in the 1850s, possibly as a result of the stream-driven mill in Nykøbing. After operations had completely ceased, the mill was acquired by Nyborg Municipality in 1939 in view of its place in the local heritage. However, it continued to fall further into disrepair until a citizens' initiative led to restoration work in the 1960s and 1970s. Thereafter, it once again deteriorated until it came into the hands of the guild Ejegod Møllelaug in 2002. Extensive external restoration work, which began in 2002, was completed in 2010 with a new gallery and new shingles on the roof. The guild is now trying to raise funds for restoration of the mill's interior.

The mill, together with the miller's house and an outhouse, became a listed building in 1964. A toy museum was established within the old mill house in 2009, and is supported by the mill guild.
