= Nykøbing Falster =

- Town
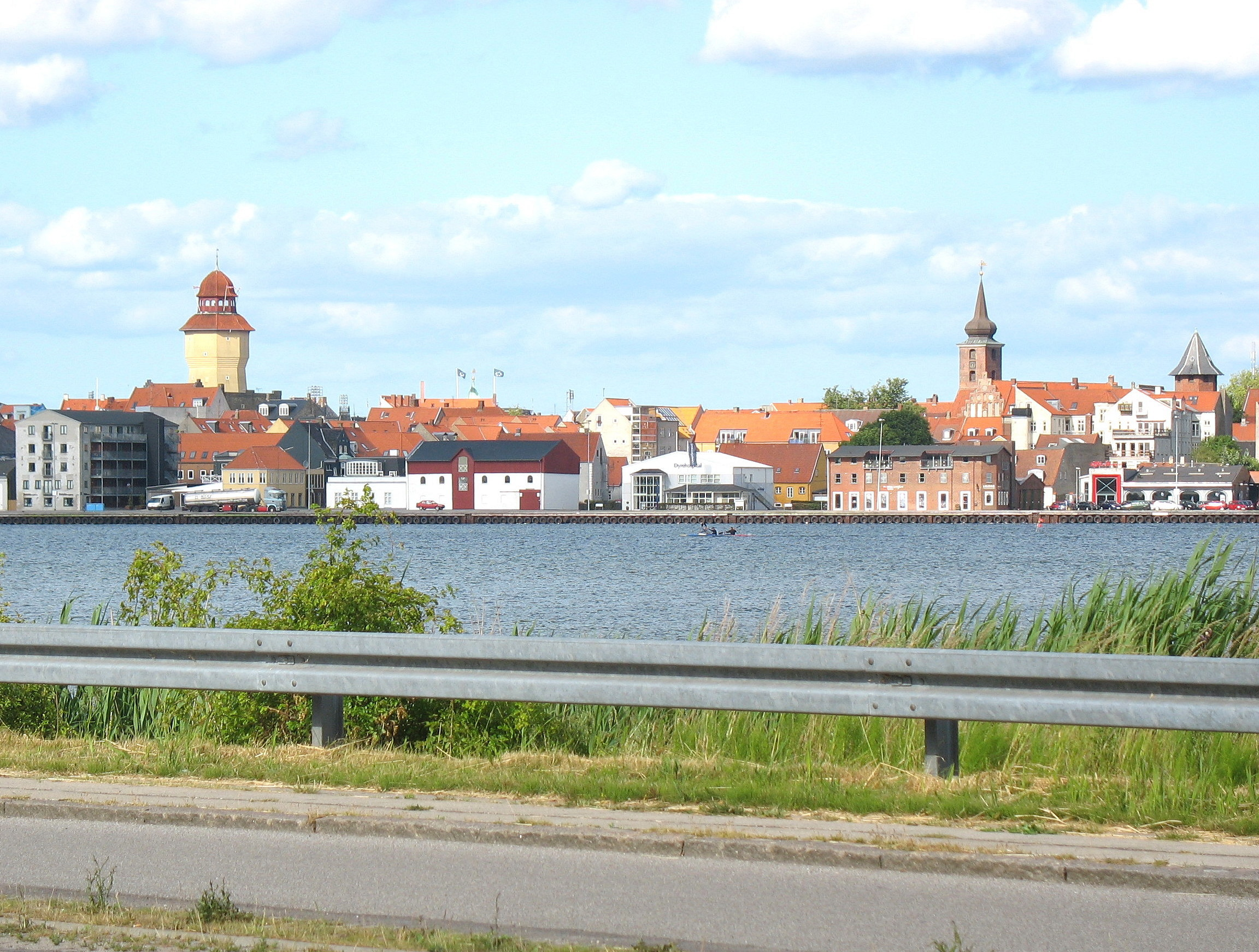
- Nykøbing Falster waterfront

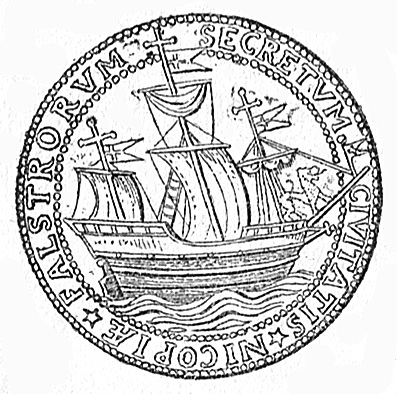
- Seal Coat of arms

- Location in Denmark Nykøbing Falster (Denmark) Nykøbing Falster (European Union)
- Coordinates: 54.76542°N 11.87549°E
- Country: Denmark
- Region: Zealand (Sjælland)
- Municipality: Guldborgsund

Government
  - Mayor: Simon Hansen

Area
  - Urban: 8 km^{2} (3.1 sq mi)

Population (2026)
  - Urban: 16,656
  - Urban density: 2,100/km^{2} (5,400/sq mi)
  - total: 19,892 (incl. Sundby)
- Time zone: UTC+1 (Central Europe Time)
  - Summer (DST): UTC+2
- Postal code: 4800
- Website: visitlolland-falster.com

Nykøbing Falster (IPA: [ˈnyˌkʰøˀpe̝ŋ ˈfælˀstɐ]; originally named Nykøbing) is a town on the island of Falster in southern Denmark. It has a population of 16,656 (1 January 2026). Including the satellite town Sundby on the Lolland side, with a population of 3,236, the total population is 19,892.

Nykøbing Falster is the seat of the Guldborgsund kommune in Region Sjælland. The city lies on Falster, and is connected by the 295-metre-long (323 yd) Frederick IX Bridge over the Guldborgsund (Guldborg Strait) waterway to the island of Lolland.

== Overview ==
Nykøbing Falster is the largest city on the islands of Lolland and Falster, and is often called "Nykøbing F." to distinguish it from at least two other cities in Denmark with the name of Nykøbing. Nykøbing Falster is the seat of state and regional authorities. Additionally, a city in Sweden is called Nyköping, which means exactly the same thing ("new market") in the closely related language.

There is a 0.5-kilometre (0.31 mi) long commercial district, walking street (gågade) on the Falster side of the city with a wide selection of shops. At the end of the street is a large plaza where special events are arranged. These include popular late-night events, which are held several times a year. It has a large central library in the center of town.

The town receives many visitors during the summer, especially from Germany.

== History ==
=== Early history ===
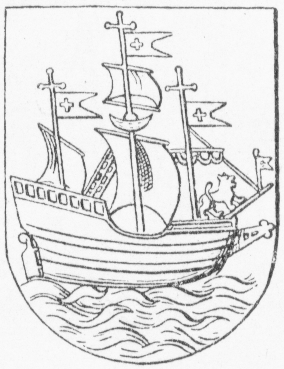
Coat of arms in 1655

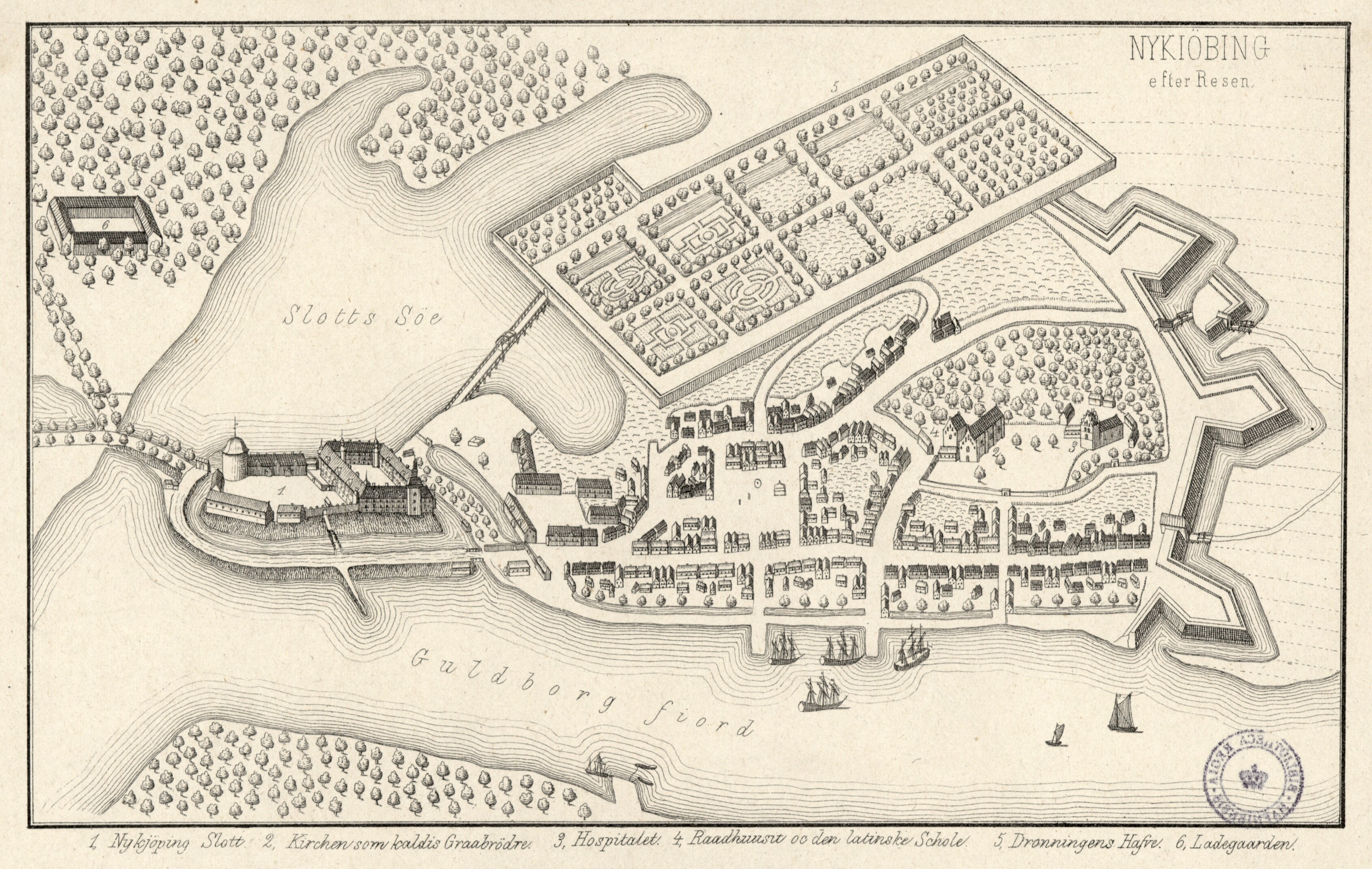
Map from 1675.

Nykøbing Falster was founded around a 12th-century medieval castle. At the end of the 12th century, fortifications were set up on a peninsula on Guldborgsund for protection against the Wends, and these were later converted into Nykøbing Castle. The town of Nykøbing Falster grew up around these fortifications. After the Reformation, the castle was the residence of widowed Danish queens. As several queens of German descent resided here, many Germans came to the town.

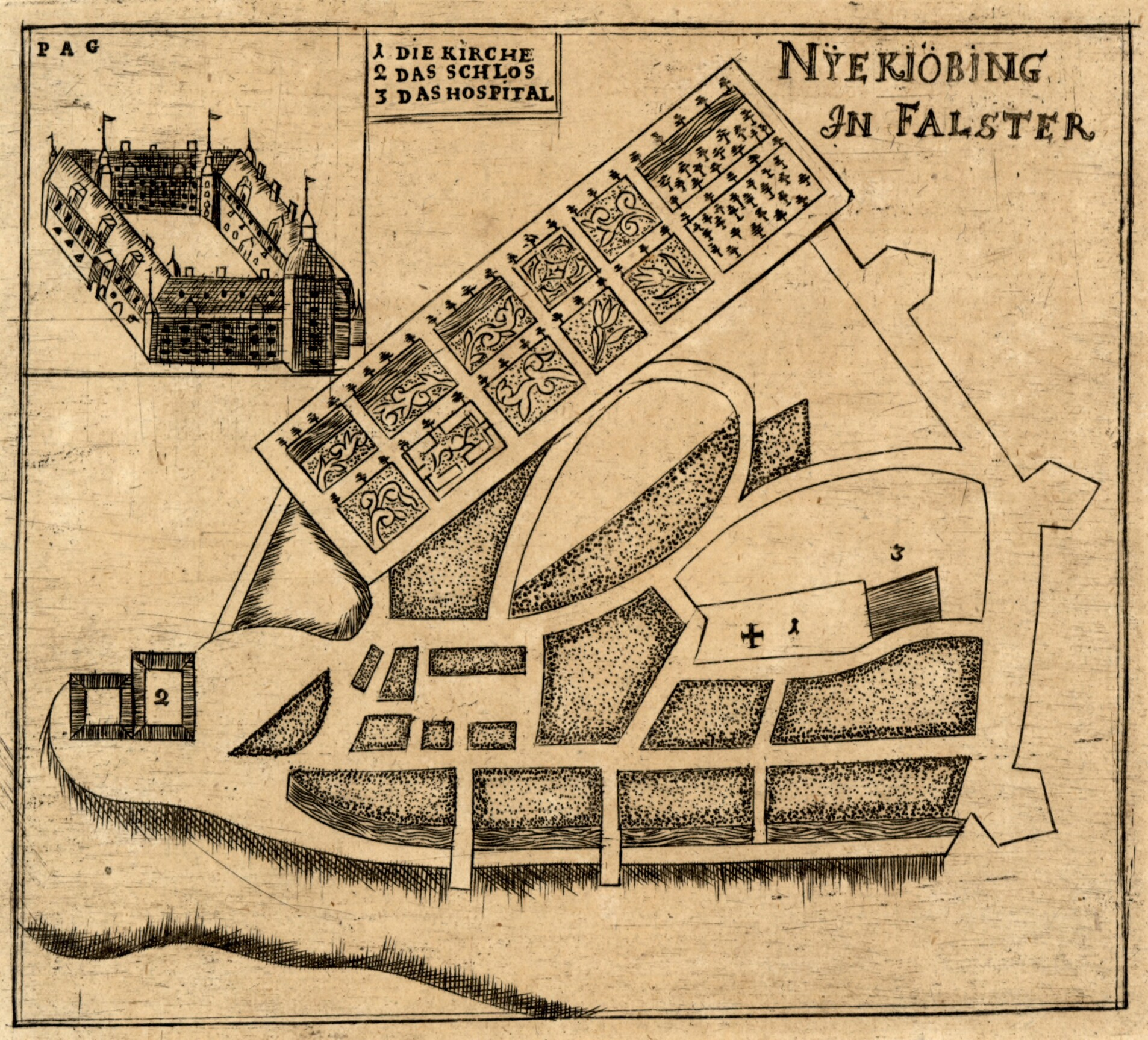
Nykøbing in 1740.

Situated on a headland, the castle was protected from all sides. In its early days, the castle belonged to the royal house. Medieval documents issued in this region reveal that the royal court regularly visited the castle. This is the castle where Christopher II died (1332) and where Christian V was married (1667). Christian, Prince Elect of Denmark resided here. The castle was chartered in 1539. REF

The castle and the entire crown land on Falster were put up for sale in 1763 to help improve the poor state of government finances. The castle was sold for demolition, and only the modest ruin of one of the towers, Fars Hat (Father’s Hat in Danish) is in existence today.

=== Recent history ===
From 1970 to 2006, Nykøbing was the administrative seat of the former county of Storstrøm as well as the Nykøbing Falster municipality.

On 1 January 2007, the former Nykøbing Falster municipality merged with Nysted, Nørre Alslev, Sakskøbing, Stubbekøbing, and Sydfalster municipalities to form Guldborgsund municipality. This municipal reform, Kommunalreformen, created a municipality with an area of 907 square kilometres (350 sq mi) and a total population of 63,533 (2005) and will belong to the new Region Sjælland ("Zealand Region"). The former Nykøbing Falster municipality covered an area of 134 square kilometres (52 sq mi) with a total population of 25,483 (2005).

== Geography ==
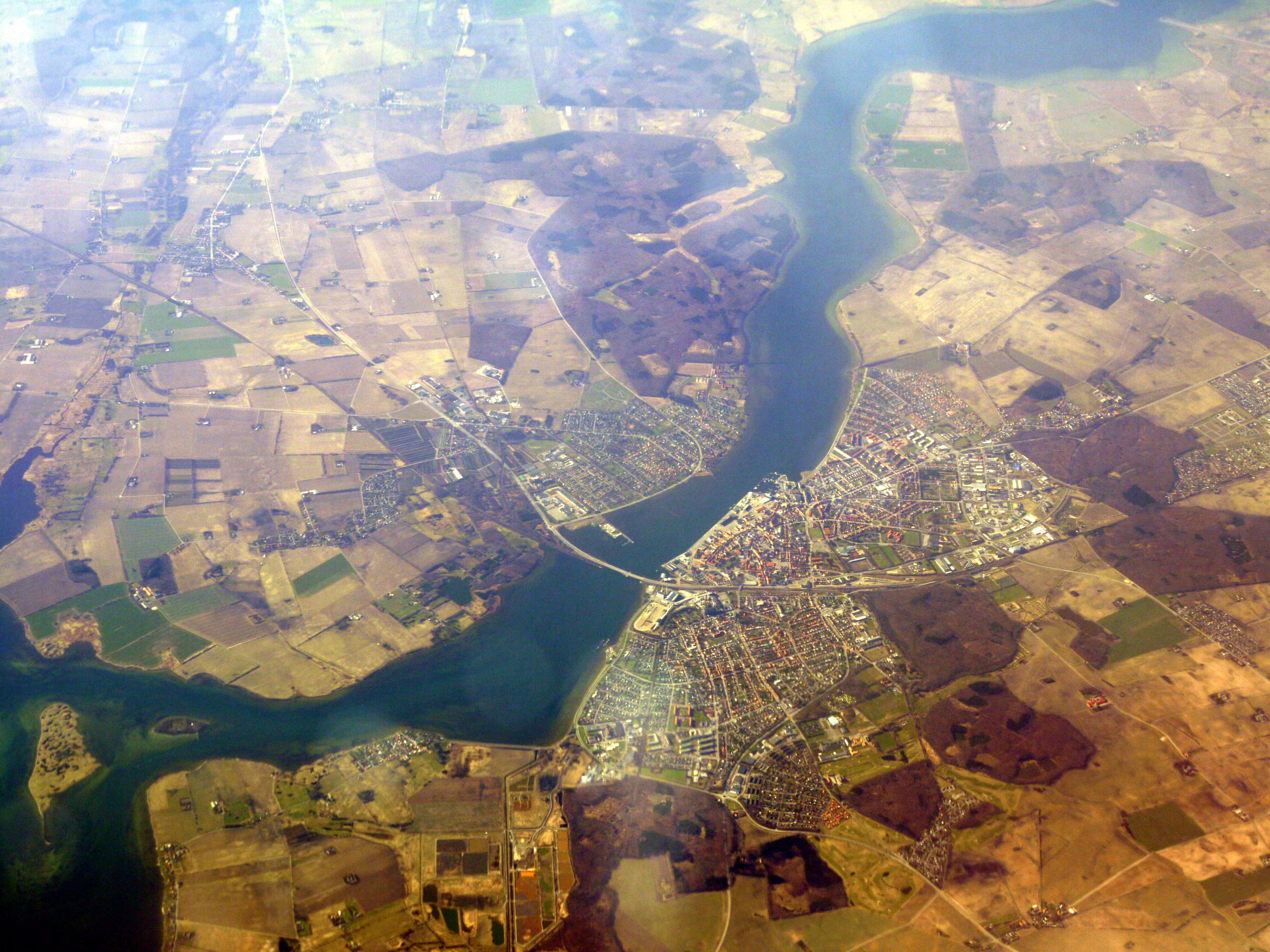
Aerial view of Nykøbing Falster (April 2010)

Nykøbing Falster is a harbor town which is located roughly in the middle of the western coast of the island of Falster. It is located where the Tingsted Stream (Danish: Tingsted Å) empties into the Guldborgsund strait which divides the islands of Falster and Lolland.

== Main sights ==
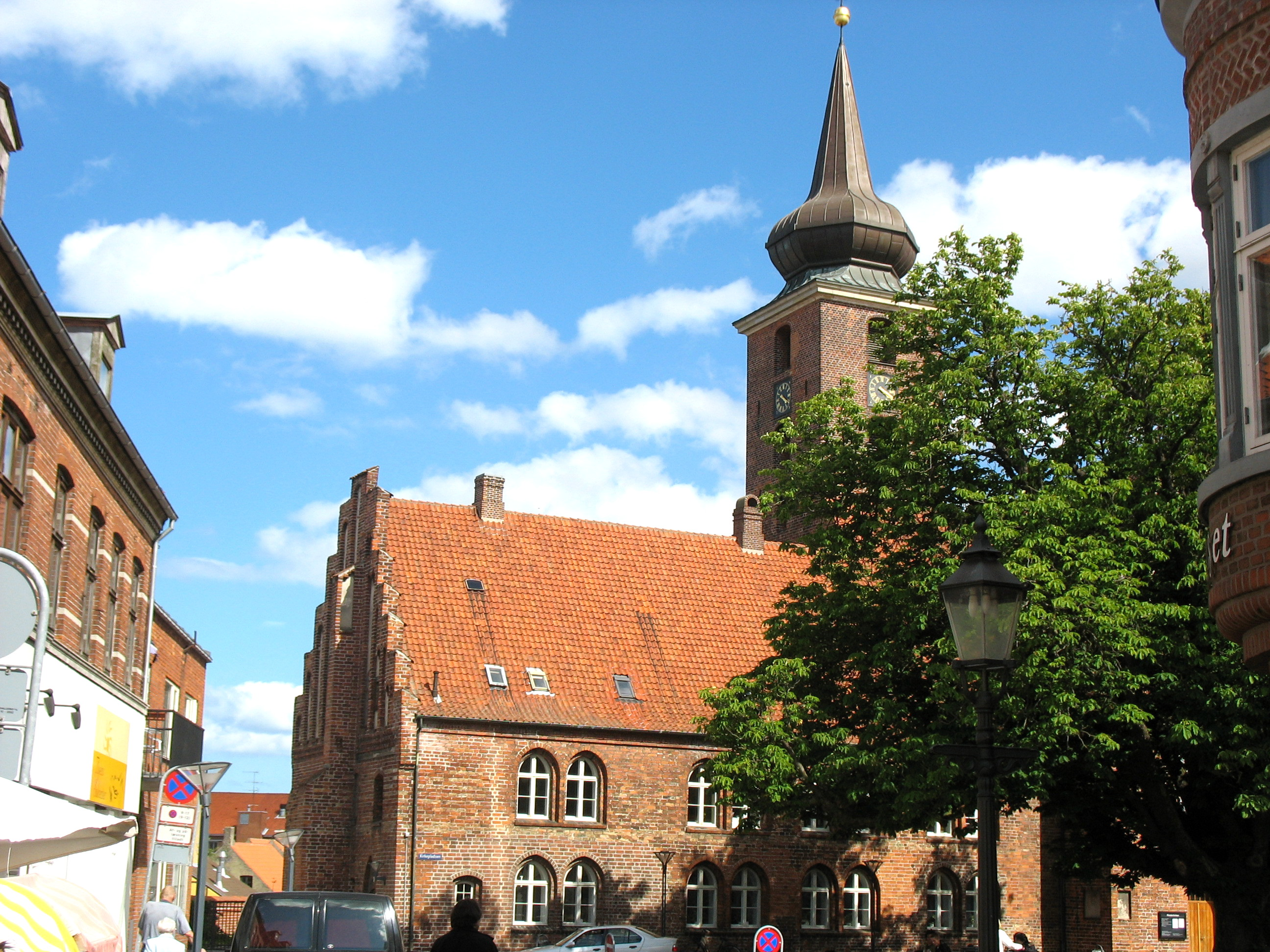
The old abbey church (Klosterkirken)

The city has a few noteworthy buildings, including a wooden house from 1580 and Czarens Hus ("The Tsar's House"), named in memory of Tsar Peter the Great of Russia, who stayed there in 1716. The most noteworthy attraction is the city's old water tower, Nykøbing Vandtårn, which was built in 1909 and remains an icon of the city and the surrounding areas. Today, the water tower houses a small cultural center holding art exhibitions and cultural events.

Other attractions include:

- the City Museum (Bymuseet)
- the Middle Ages Center (Middelaldercentret), located in Sundby
- Ejegod Windmill with its toy museum
- The abbey church founded in 1419.
- Guldborgsund Zoo. (formerly "The People's Park")
- The fire fighting museum (Brandmuseet)

== Transportation ==
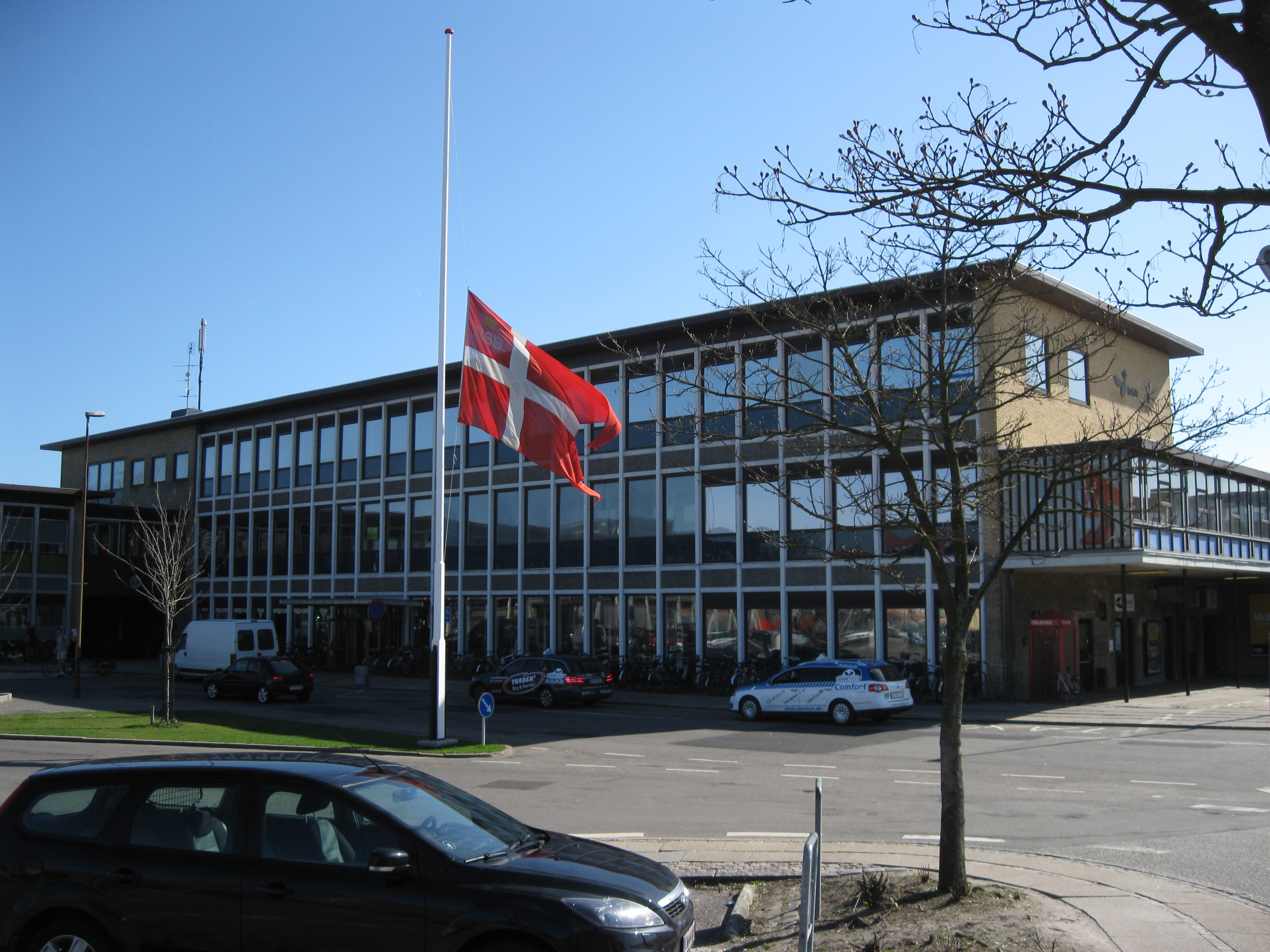
Nykøbing Falster railway station.

Nykøbing Falster has a railway station operated by Danish State Railways. It is the terminus for regular local passenger-train services from Copenhagen via Ringsted and Køge. International trains operating between Copenhagen and Hamburg called at the station until 2019, and are now re-routed via Flensburg. The Lollandsbanen also operates a rail service to Nakskov.

== International relations ==
=== Twin towns – sister cities ===
Nykøbing Falster is twinned with:

- Lublin, Poland

== Sport ==
The local handball team Nykøbing Falster HK won the Danish Women's Championship in 2017.

In football, the local team Nykøbing FC competes in the 4th tier of Danish football.

== Notable residents ==
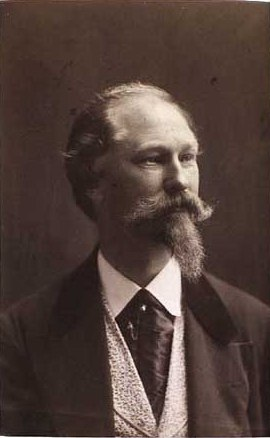
Ludvig Grundtvig

- Sophie of Mecklenburg-Güstrow (1557–1631 in Nykøbing Falster), Queen of Denmark and Norway by marriage to Frederick II of Denmark, mother of King Christian IV of Denmark
- Anne Palles (1619–executed for sorcery in 1693), an alleged witch, hired in Nykøbing Falster by a woman to drug and murder her abusive and violent husband
- Ludvig Grundtvig (1836–1901), a Danish photographer and portrait painter
- Ingeborg Tolderlund (1848–1935), a Danish women's rights activist and suffragist
- Christian Blangstrup (1857–1926), a Danish encyclopedist
- Peter Freuchen (1886–1957), a Danish Arctic explorer, author, journalist and anthropologist
- Vagn J. Brøndegaard (1919–2014), a Danish ethnobotanist
- Gert Petersen (1927–2009), a journalist and politician who helped found the Socialist People's Party
- Claus Meyer (born 1963), a culinary entrepreneur, food activist, cookbook author and TV host
- Martin Geertsen (born 1970), Venstre party politician
- Pilgrimz (1998–2013), a local rock band

=== Sport ===
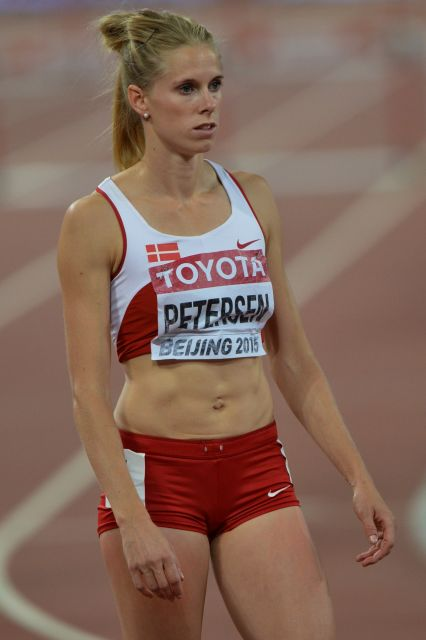
Sara Petersen, 2015

- Carl Andersen (1879–1967), a gymnast at the 1908 Summer Olympics and later an architect
- Henrik Danielsen (born 1966), a Danish-Icelandic chess grandmaster and Icelandic Chess Champion in 2009
- Jørgen Nielsen (born 1971), a Danish former football goalkeeper, 340 club caps
- Michael Hansen (born 1971), a Danish former professional football player, over 460 club caps
- Claus Jensen (born 1977), a former footballer, 310 club caps and 47 for Denmark
- Esben Hansen (born 1981), a Danish former football midfielder, 230 club caps
- Anders Due (born 1982), a Danish footballer, 270 club caps
- Johanna Rasmussen (born 1983), a Danish professional footballer, 152 caps for Denmark
- Sara Petersen (born 1987), a Danish hurdler, silver medallist at the 2016 Summer Olympics
- Mikkel Rygaard Jensen (born 1990), a Danish footballer with over 300 club caps
- Mikkel Mac (born 1992), a Danish racing driver
- Mikkel Michelsen (born 1994), a Danish speedway rider
- Rikke Sevecke (born 1996), a Danish women's football defender

== See also ==
- Guldborgsund
- Gedser
- Guldborg
- Marielyst
- Nagelsti
- Nykøbing Falster Håndboldklub
- Nørre Alslev
- Nysted
- Øster Toreby
- Sakskøbing
- Stubbekøbing
- Sundby
- Toreby
