= Yaw =

Yaw or yaws may refer to:

== Measurement and technology ==
=== Movement about the vertical axis ===
- Yaw angle (or yaw rotation), one of the angular degrees of freedom of any stiff body (for example a vehicle), describing rotation about the vertical axis
  - Yaw (aviation), one of the aircraft principal axes of rotation, describing motion about the vertical axis of an aircraft (nose-left or nose-right angle measured from vertical axis)
  - Yaw (ship motion), one of the ship motions' principal axes of rotation, describing motion about the vertical axis of a ship (bow-left or bow-right angle measured from vertical axis)
- Yaw rate (or yaw velocity), the angular speed of yaw rotation, measured with a yaw rate sensor
- Yawing moment, the angular momentum of a yaw rotation, important for adverse yaw in aircraft dynamics

=== Wind turbines ===
- Yaw system, a yaw angle control system in wind turbines responsible for the orientation of the rotor towards the wind
  - Yaw bearing, the most crucial and cost intensive component of modern horizontal axis wind turbine yaw systems
  - Yaw drive, an important component of modern horizontal axis wind turbine yaw systems

=== Other technology ===
- Yaws (web server)

== People and religion ==
- Yaw (ethnic group), a Burmese ethnic group
- Yaw (name), a Ghanaian given name for a boy born on Thursday
- Ellen Beach Yaw (1869–1947), a concert singer
- Eugene Yaw (born 1943), a Republican member of the Pennsylvania State Senate
- Shane Dawson (born Shane Lee Yaw in 1987)
- Yaw (god), a Levantine god

== Other ==
- Yaw-Yan, a Filipino martial art
- Yaws, a tropical disease
- CFB Shearwater (ICAO: CYAW), Shearwater, Nova Scotia Canada

== See also ==
- Yours (disambiguation), various meanings, most prominently as a pronoun
- Yew (disambiguation)
