= Kouassi =

Kouassi is a surname. Notable people with the surname include:

- Blaise Kouassi (footballer, born 1974), former Côte d'Ivoire football defender
- Blaise Kouassi (footballer, born 1983), Ivorian footballer
- Desmond N'Ze Kouassi (or Desmond N'Ze) (born 1989), Ghanaian footballer
- Euphrasie Kouassi Yao (born 1964), Ivorian politician
- Gervais Lombe Yao Kouassi known as Gervinho (born 1987), Ivorian footballer
- Jean Evrard Kouassi (born 1994), Ivorian footballer
- Marcus N'Ze Kouassi known as Marcus N'Ze (born 1987), Ghanaian footballer
- Martial Yao Kouassi (or Martial Yao) (born 1989), Ivorian footballer
- Venceslas Kouassi (born 1981), Ivorian-born Burkinabé footballer
- Victor Kouassi (born 1971), Ivorian rugby union player
- Xavier Kouassi (born 1989), Ivorian-Swiss footballer
- Owen Kouassi (born 2003), Ivorian footballer
- Arsène Kouassi (born 2004), Ivorian-Burkinabé footballer
