= Torkilstrup Windmill =

Post mill on the Danish island of Falster

Coordinates: 54°52′07″N 11°55′47″E

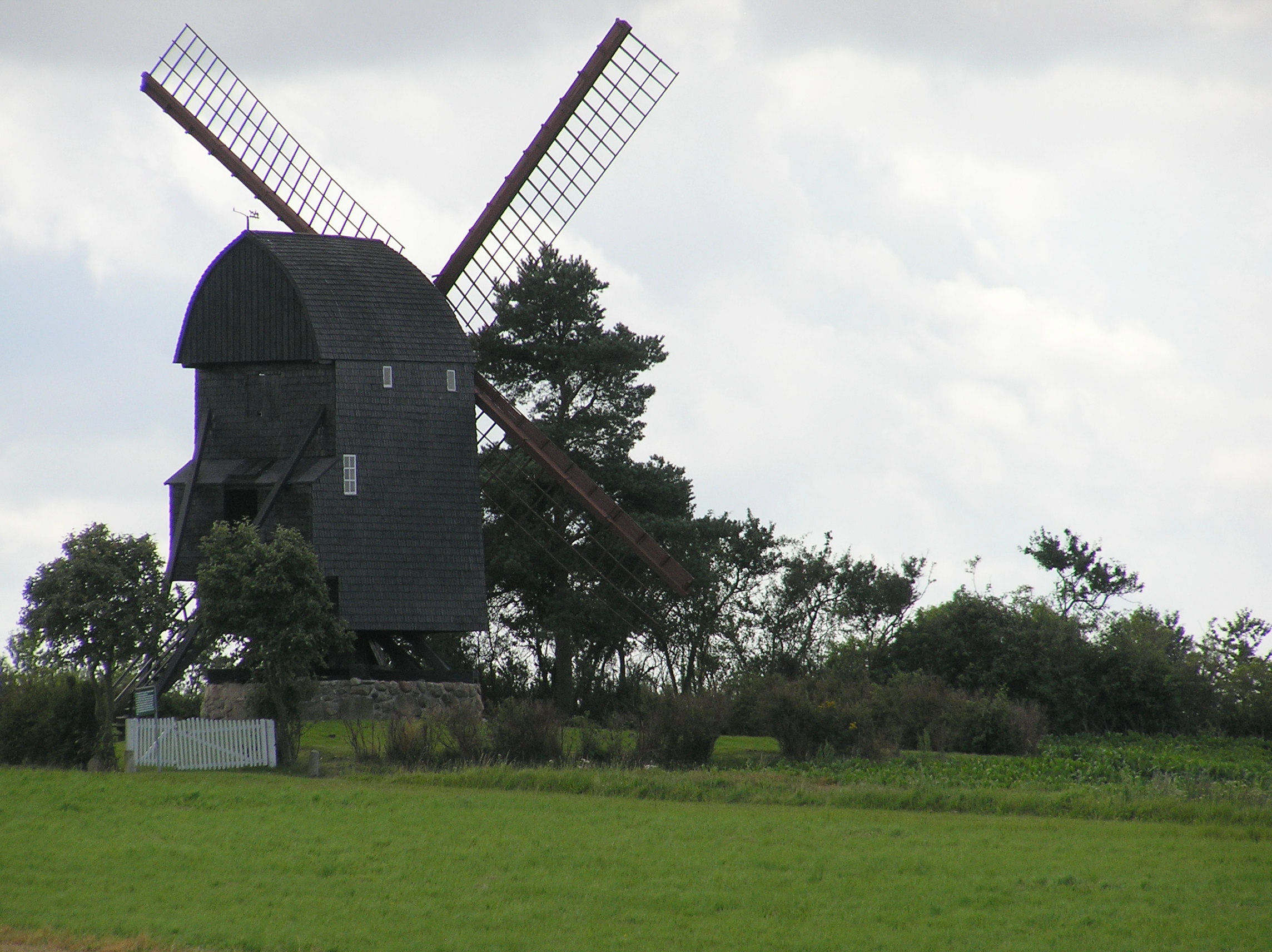
Torkilstrup Windmill

Torkilstrup Windmill (Danish: Torkilstrup Mølle) is a post mill south of the village of Torkilstrup on the Danish island of Falster. Dating from 1743, it is one of the country's few post mills which still stand on their original site. It was listed in the Danish registry of protected buildings and places in 1959.

== History ==
Standing on a hill to the south of the village, the grain mill dates back to c. 1650. Hans Mortensen acquired it in 1726, operating it for the next 44 years. In 1743, he rebuilt the mill, recording the date on an interior beam around a heart containing his initials (HMSM) together with those of his wife (AMPD) Anna Margrethe Pedersdatter. Mortensen must have been a thrifty individual. On his death at the age of 65, in addition to a chiming clock, an iron stove, a four-poster bed, a Bible and a German prayerbook, he left an amount of over 793 rigsdaler, an exceptionally high amount of money for a farmer of his day. The mill remained in operation until 1945.

The mill was listed in the Danish registry of protected buildings and places in 1959. It was restored in 1993 in connection with its 250th anniversary. Since 2003, the mill has been under the ownership of Guldborgsund municipality, the authority charged with its preservation.

== Design ==
The rectangular mill stands on a fieldstone foundation. The wooden body of the mill is faced with shingles. The boat-shaped roof is also covered with shingles. It has latticed vanes with a span of 60 feet (18 m), designed to be covered with sailcloth. The mill can be rotated by means of a manually operated yaw. For a period, a bakery was attached to the mill. The workings of the mill have been preserved and include grinders, an oat roller, a drum sieve, a cap wheel, a crown drive and a vane shaft.

== Access ==
Equipped with tables and benches for picnics, the area around the mill can be freely accessed. The mill itself is open to visitors on Ascension Day from 10 am to noon, on the third Sunday in June (Danish mill day) from 10 am to 2 pm, and on the day the harvest festival is celebrated in Torkilstrup Church. It can also be visited by appointment.
