= Yao =

Yao or YAO may refer to:

== People ==
- Yao (surname), the transliteration of Chinese family names 姚, 銚, and 么
- Emperor Yao, a mythical Chinese ruler and emperor
- Yao Ming (born 1980), Chinese basketball all-star who played for the Houston Rockets
- Euphrasie Kouassi Yao (born 1964), Ivorian politician
- Andrew Yao (born 1946), Chinese computational theorist

=== Ethnic groups and languages ===
- a tribe by the shores of Lake Malawi
- Yao people (Asia), ethnic minority group of southern China and Vietnam
- Yao languages spoken by the Yao
- Yao people (East Africa), people of south-central Africa
- Yao language, a Bantu language spoken by the Yao people in Africa
- Yao language (Trinidad), an extinct Cariban language formerly spoken on Trinidad

== Places ==
- Yao, Chad, a town in Chad
- Yao, Osaka, a city in Japan
- Mount Xiao, or Mount Yao, in Henan, China
- Mount Yao (Lushan County), in Henan, China
- Yaoundé Airport, IATA code YAO
- Yau Oi stop, MTR station code YAO
- Yunnan Astronomical Observatory, in east suburb of Kunming, Yunnan, China

== Media ==
- Yao (film), 2018 French film by Philippe Godeau
- Yao, a character in Mulan (1998 film)
- Medicine (short story), 1922 Chinese short story by Lu Xun
- Yao Wang, also known as China from the 2009 anime Hetalia

== Other uses ==
- Yao may be short for yaodong, a type of Chinese cave dwelling
- Yao (Gnosticism), the name of an archon in Gnostic scripture
- Yao (爻), the term for the marks used in the preparation of trigrams and hexagrams in I Ching that is also the basis for Kangxi radical 89
- Yao graph, a subgraph that guarantees connectivity

== See also ==
- Yau (disambiguation)
- Yaw (disambiguation)
