= Yau =

Yau may refer to:

- Yau (surname), (Latinized) Cantonese surname
- Yau language (Trans–New Guinea), a Finisterre language of New Guinea
- Yau language (Torricelli), a Torricelli language of Papua New Guinea
- Hodï language (ISO 639-3: yau), a language of Venezuela
- Kattiniq/Donaldson Airport, near Raglan Mines, Quebec, Canada
- Yezin Agricultural University, Myanmar
- Yogmaga Ayurveda University, a government-initiated institution dedicated to preserving and promoting Himalayan healing traditions, including Ayurveda, Sowa-rigpa, and yoga.

== See also ==
- Yao (disambiguation)
- Yaw (disambiguation)
