= Torkilstrup Rectory =

- Torkilstrup Præstegård
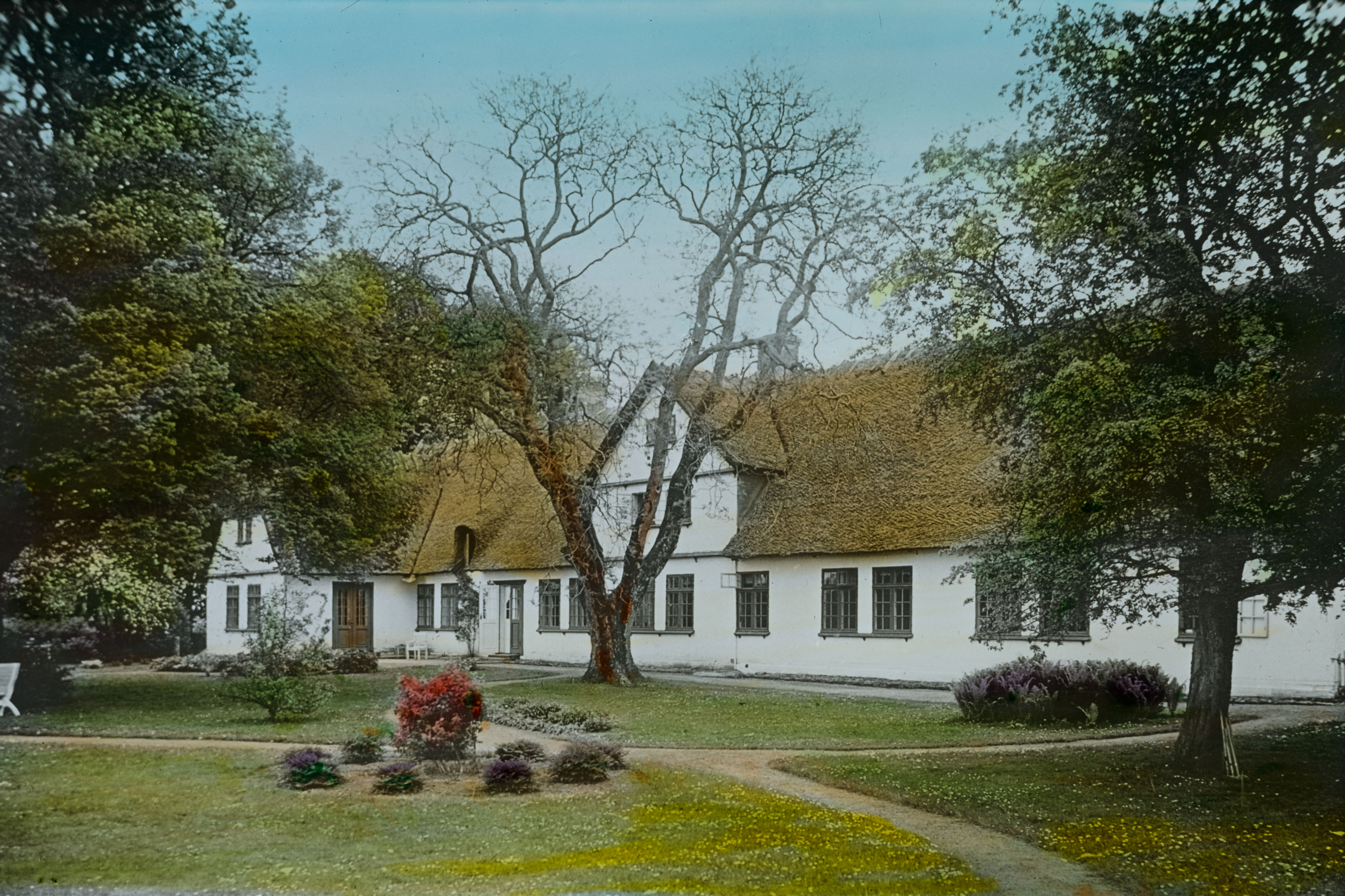
- Interactive map of the Torkilstrup Rectory area

General information
- Location: Torkilstrupvej 14, 4863 Eskilstrup, Denmark
- Coordinates: 54°52′17.4″N 11°55′56.2″E
- Completed: 1761

Torkilstrup Rectory (Danish: Torkilstrup Præstegård) is located just east of Torkilstrup Church in the village of Torkilstrup, some 7 km (4 mi) southeast of Nørre Alslev, on the Danish island of Falster. A stone outside the rectory commemorates that Bernhard Severin Ingemann was born in the building. The rectory was listed in the Danish registry of protected buildings and places in 1950.

== History ==
The rectory was built in 1761. The writer Bernhard Severin Ingemann's father Søren Sørensen Ingemann was vicar at Torkilstrup from 1774. As of 1782, he also served as provost of Falster Nørre Herred. Ingemann was born in the rectory as the youngest of nine children in 1789 and lived there until his father's death ten years later. The family then moved to Slagelse where Ingemann was awarded a scholarship to attend the local Slagelse Latin School. He has described his early childhood memories from the rectory in Denne Aldersopfattelse af hint Barndomsli.

N. F. S. Grundtvig's brother Otto (1772-1843) succeeded Ingemann's father as rector of Torkilstrup. He resided in the rectory until 1823 when he was transferred to Gladsaxe. The poet Christian Winther spent his honeymoon in Torkilstrup Rectory.

The building was refurbished in 1909. It was listed in the Danish registry of protected buildings and places in 1950. In 2007, it was subject to a comprehensive renovation undertaken by Berings Tegnestue.

== Architecture ==
The rectory has white-plastered walls, a thatched roof and stands on a black-painted foundation of field stones. The original two-winged building is located on the north and west side of a yard. The residential north wing from 1763 is mostly built with timber framing but with smaller sections of masonry. The large, through-going gabled wall dormer dates from the 1840s. The west wing was originally used as stables and storage space. It is constructed in brick and has cast iron windows. A short, third "garden wing" projects northwards from the eastern end of the residential wing. It was built as downer house for Ingemann's mother. Floors, windows, windows and other details are painted in a bluish-green colour.

== See also ==
- Store Tåstrup Rectory
