= Torkilstrup =

- Town
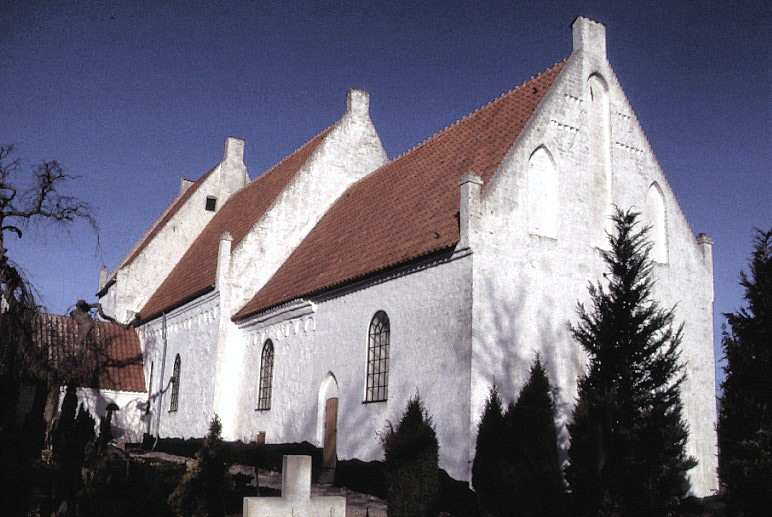
- Torkilstrup Church, Falster

- Location on Falster
- Coordinates: 54°52′15″N 11°55′50″E
- Country: Denmark
- Region: Zealand (Sjælland)
- Municipality: Guldborgsund
- Time zone: UTC+1 (CET)
  - Summer (DST): UTC+2 (CEST)

Torkilstrup, also Torkildstrup, is a little village some 7 kilometres (4.3 mi) southeast of Nørre Alslev on the Danish island of Falster. It is best known for Torkilstrup Church, one of the island's oldest churches, built before 1160. The adjacent Torkilstrup Rectory and Torkilstrup Windmill are both on the Danish registry of protected buildings and places.

== History ==
Torkilstrup is one of several villages, or torper, which were established between 1000 and 1250 to accommodate populations from neighbouring villages. There are 15 such villages in the region that originally had names ending in -torp, which over time evolved to -rup or trup.

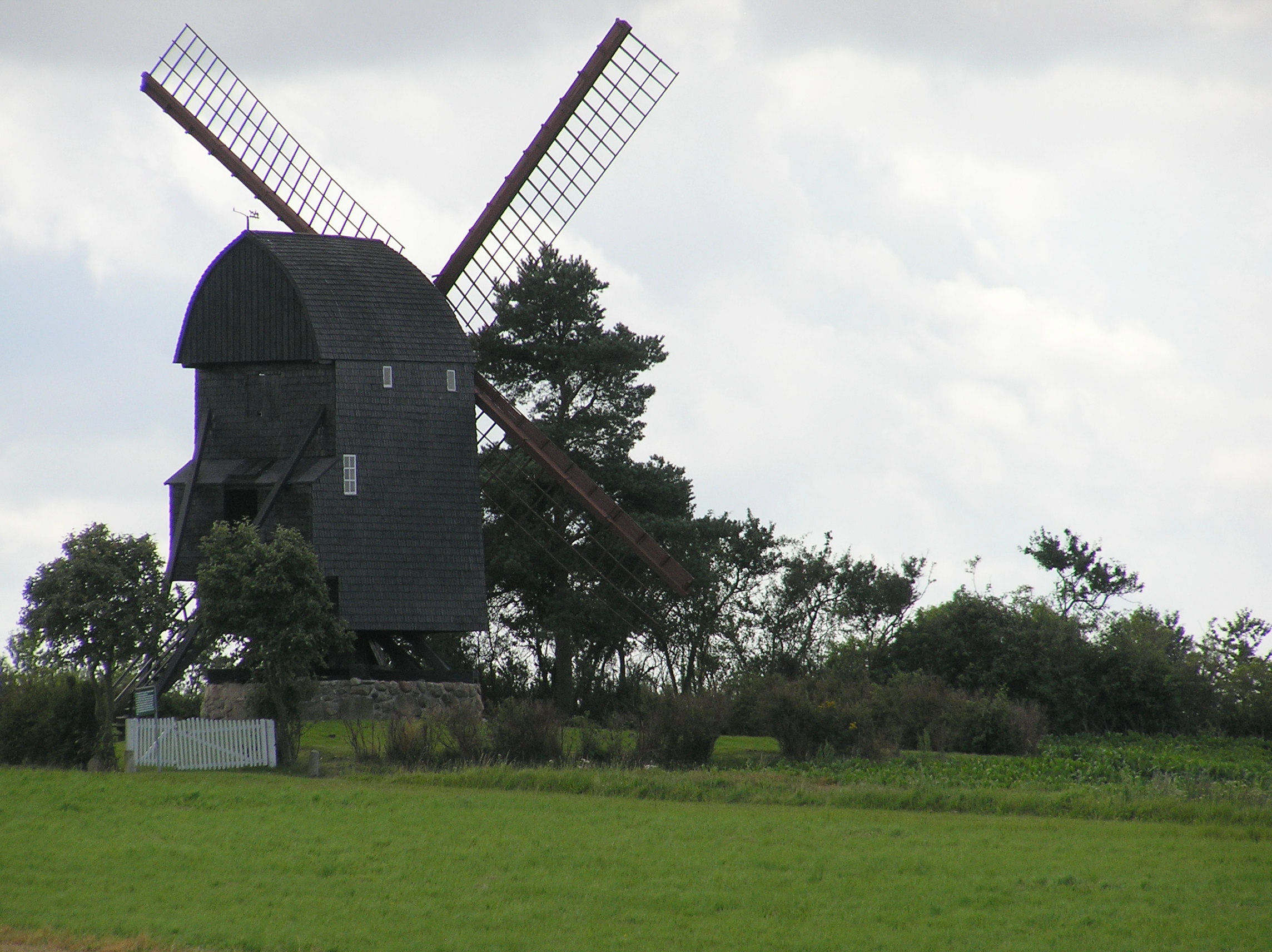
Torkilstrup Windmill

With sections dating from the second half of the 12th century, Torkilstrup Church is well furnished. It is built of limestone and boulders, and is surrounded by a churchyard. It is located close to Gundslevmagle from where Torkilstrup's inhabitants first came. In the mid-13th century, more than half of Torkilstrup belonged to one man, probably already living in Torkilstrupgård, which was first documented in 1452. It burnt down in 1662 although sections of its moat can still be seen. From 1662, the Crown owned all the farms in the village. After they were sold into private ownership in 1766, Torkilstrup came under Skørringe.

Torkilstrup is a good example of an irregular roadside community, whereas Gundslevmagle is an excellent example of a fully regular roadside village. The village has three important 18th-century buildings: the riding school (1722), the rectory (1763) and the post mill (first documented 1655, rebuilt 1743), the last two being listed. The riding school was built during the time of Frederick IV on the crown's equestrian grounds.

== The village today ==
Three of the old farmhouses with their outhouses can still be seen on Torkilstrupvej. Most of the other buildings date from the end of the 19th century. The windmill is one of only ten post mills in Denmark which still stand in their original setting. Constructed in the mid 17th century, the post mill windmill was rebuilt in 1743, and was in service until 1945; it now serves as a windmill museum. The old bakery and the food store have now both closed. The village still has a community centre (forsamlingshus) from 1903.

== Notable people ==
- Hans Munch (1654 in Torkilstrup - 1712) a Danish-Norwegian theologian and priest.
- Bernhard Severin Ingemann (1789 in Torkilstrup – 1862), novelist and poet.
