= Yaw bearing =

Component of wind turbines

Schematic representation of the main wind turbine components. The yaw system is located between the wind turbine nacelle and tower.

The yaw bearing is a component of a yaw system found on modern horizontal axis wind turbines. The yaw bearing must cope with enormous static and dynamic loads and moments during the wind turbine operation, and provide smooth rotation characteristics for the orientation of the nacelle under all weather conditions. It has also to be corrosion and wear resistant and extremely long lasting. It should last for the service life of the wind turbine) while being cost effective.

== History ==
Windmills of the 18th century began implementing rotatable nacelles to capture wind coming from different directions. The yaw systems of these "primitive" windmills were surprisingly similar to the ones on modern wind turbines. The nacelles rotated by means of wind driven yaw drives known as fantails, or by animal power, and were mounted on the windmill towers by means of an axial gliding bearing.

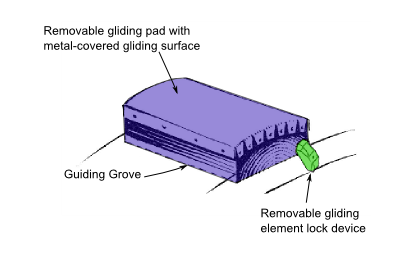
Schematic representation of a historical gliding pad and lock configuration next to...

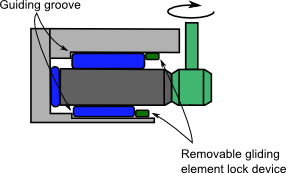
a schematic of a similar configuration found on a modern wind turbine.

These gliding bearings consisted of multiple gliding blocks fixed on the windmill tower structure. These blocks maintained sliding contact with a gliding ring on the nacelle. The gliding blocks were wooden cube-like pieces with convex gliding surface covered with animal fat, or even lined with copper (or brass) sheet as a friction reduction means. These wooden blocks were fixed in wooden slots, carved in the wooden bearing substructure, by means of nails or wedges and were carefully leveled to create a flat surface where the nacelle gliding ring could glide. The gliding blocks, despite the lubrication would wear quite often and would have to be exchanged. This operation was relatively simple due to the wedge-based connection between substructure and gliding blocks. The gliding blocks were further locked via movable locking devices which, in a different form, remain as a technical solution in modern gliding yaw bearings.

The gliding ring of the windmill nacelle was made from multiple wooden parts and, despite the old construction techniques, was usually quite level, allowing the nacelle to rotate smoothly around the tower axis.

The hybrid yaw bearing system combines the solutions old windmills used. This system comprises multiple removable radial gliding pads in combination with an axial roller bearing.

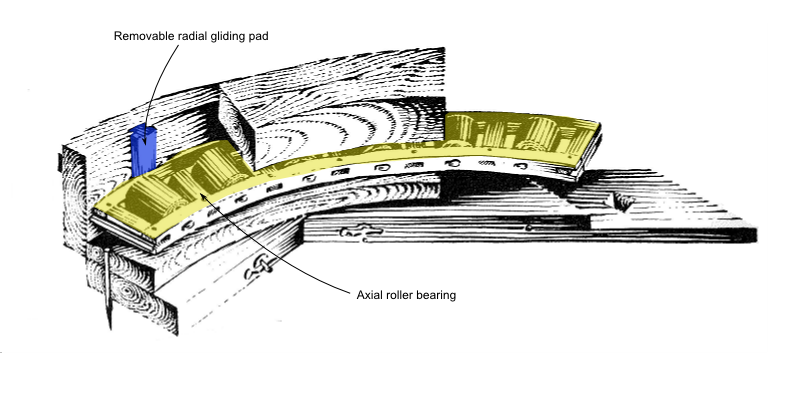
Schematic representation of a historical hybrid yaw bearing with axial rollers and radial gliding pads.

== Types ==
The main categories of yaw bearings are:

- Roller Yaw Bearing: Large diameter bearing (usually four-point bearing)
- Gliding Yaw Bearing: Dry or lubricated gliding bearing with plurality of axial and radial gliding pads being in friction contact with a large diameter steel disk, usually combined with the gear-rim as a single element

== Roller yaw bearing ==
Schematic representation of a typical roller yaw bearing configuration of a modern wind turbine.

The roller yaw bearing is a common technical yaw bearing solution followed by many wind turbine manufacturers as it offers low turning friction and smooth rotation of the nacelle. The low turning friction permits the implementation of slightly smaller yaw drives (compared to the gliding bearing solution), but on the other hand requires a yaw braking system.

Some manufacturers use a plurality of smaller yaw drives (usually six) to facilitate easy replacement. Such a configuration with a plurality of yaw drives often offers the possibility of active yaw braking using differential torque from the yaw drives. In this case half of the yaw drives apply a small amount of torque for clockwise rotation and the other half apply torque in the opposite direction and then activate the internal magnetic brakes of the electric motor. In this way the pinion-gear rim backlash is eliminated and the nacelle is fixed in place.

== Gliding yaw bearing ==
Schematic representation of the components of a modern gliding yaw bearing.

Schematic representation of a typical gliding yaw bearing configuration of a modern wind turbine.

The gliding yaw bearing is a combined axial and radial bearing, which serves as a rotatable connection of the wind turbine nacelle and the tower. Contrary to the old windmill concept, the modern yaw bearings support the nacelle also from the top thus restraining the nacelle from being rotated by the Y-axis due to the moments induced by the upper half of the rotor sweep disk and the X-axis due to the torque of the drive train (i.e. rotor, shaft, generator, etc. ).

Principally, the simplest way to accomplish the yaw bearing tasks with gliding elements is with two gliding planes for the axial loads (top and bottom) and a radial gliding surface for the radial loads. Consequently, the gliding yaw bearing comprises three general surfaces covered with multiple gliding pads. These gliding pads come in sliding contact with a steel disk, which is usually equipped with gear teeth to form a gliding-disk/gear-rim. The teeth may be located at the inner or the outer cylindrical face of the disk, while the arrangement of the gliding pads and their exact number and location vary strongly among the existing designs. To assemble the gliding yaw bearings, their cages split in several segments that are assembled together during wind turbine installation or manufacturing.

In its simplest form, the gliding yaw bearing uses pads (usually made out of polymers) distributed around the three contact surfaces to provide a proper guiding system for the radial and axial movement with relatively low friction coefficient. Such systems are economical and very robust but do not allow individual adjustment of the axial and radial gliding elements. This function importantly minimizes the axial and radial "play" of the gliding bearing due to manufacturing tolerances as well as due to wear of the gliding pads during operation.

To solve this problem, yaw systems incorporate pre-tensioned gliding bearings. These bearings have gliding pads that are pressed via pressure elements against the gliding disk to stabilize the nacelle against undesirable movement. The pressure elements can be simple steel springs, pneumatic, or hydraulic pre-tension elements, etc. The use of pneumatic or hydraulic pre-tension elements allows active control of the yaw bearing pre-tension, which provides yaw brake function.

== Wear and lubrication ==
In all gliding bearings wear is an issue of concern, as well as lubrication. Conventional gliding yaw bearings incorporate gliding elements manufactured out of polymer plastics such as polyoxymethylene plastic (POM) or polyamide (PA). To reduce friction, wear, and avoid stick-slip effects (often present in such high friction slow moving systems), lubrication is often introduced. This solution generally solves the gliding issues, but introduces more components to the systems and increases the general complication (e.g., difficult maintenance procedures for removal of used lubricant). Some wind turbine manufacturers now use self lubricating gliding elements instead of a central lubrication system. These gliding elements are manufactured from low friction materials or composites (e.t.g polytetrafluoroethylene (Teflon)) that allow reliable operation of dry (non-lubricated) gliding yaw systems.

== Maintenance and repair ==
Despite the fact that the gliding yaw bearings and their components are designed and constructed to last the service life of the wind turbine, it should be possible to replace worn out yaw bearing gliding elements or other components of the yaw system. To allow for replace-ability of worn out components, the yaw systems are designed in segments. Usually one or more gliding planes comprise several sub-elements that contain a number of gliding elements (radial or axial or a combination). These sub-elements can be individually removed and repaired, re-fit or replaced. In this way the yaw bearing can be serviced without the need of dis-assembly of the whole gliding yaw bearing (e.g., in case of a roller yaw bearing, dis-assembly of the whole wind turbine). This rep-arability offered by the segmented design of the gliding yaw bearing is one of the most important advantages of this system against the roller yaw bearing solution.

The only remaining issue is the replacement of the gliding elements of the gliding yaw bearing surface, which is not segmented. This is usually the top axial surface of the gliding bearing, which constantly supports the weight of the whole nacelle-rotor assembly. For the gliding elements of this gliding surface to be replaced, the nacelle-rotor assembly must be lifted by an external crane. An alternative solution to this problem is the use of mechanical or hydraulic jacks able to partially or fully lift the nacelle-rotor assembly while the gliding yaw bearing is still in place. In this way and by providing a small clearance between the gliding elements and the gliding disk, it is possible to exchange the sliding elements without dismantling the gliding yaw bearing.

== Bearing Adjustment ==
Detailed view of a typical pre-tension system for an azimuth (yaw) gliding bearing of a modern wind turbine.

When the wind turbine nacelle is positioned on the tower and the yaw bearing assembly is completed it is necessary to adjust the pressure on the individual gliding pads of the bearing. This is necessary in order to avoid un-even wear of the gliding pads and excessive loading on some sectors of the yaw bearing. In order to achieve that, an adjustment mechanism is necessary, which enables the technicians to adjust the contact pressure of each individual gliding element in a controllable and secure way. The most common solution is the utilization of bottom bearing plates equipped with large opening, which accommodate the adjustable gliding bearing systems. These adjustable gliding bearings comprise a gliding unit (i.e. gliding pad) and an adjustable pressure distribution plate. In between the gliding pad and the pressure plate several spring (pre-tension) elements are located. The vertical position of the pressure plates is usually controlled by an adjustment screw. This adjustment screw presses against the pressure plate while being retained by a counter-pressure support plate, fixed on the bearing assembly with strong bolts. In this way it is possible to apply various levels of contact pressure among the different gliding pads and therefore to ensure that each gliding component of the yaw bearing arrangement is performing as anticipated.

== See also ==
- Wind power
- Wind turbine design
