= Venceslas Kouassi =

Ivorian-born Burkinabé footballer

Personal information
- Full name: Joël Venceslas Kouassi
- Date of birth: 25 October 1981 (age 44)
- Place of birth: Abidjan, Ivory Coast
- Height: 1.82 m (6 ft 0 in)
- Position: Defender

Youth career
- 1998–2000: Nantes

Senior career*
Years	Team	Apps	(Gls)
2000–2002	Nantes	0	(0)
2002–2009	Libourne Saint-Seurin	111	(0)

International career
2006–2009	Burkina Faso	26	(0)
- * Club domestic league appearances and goals

Joël Venceslas Kouassi (born 25 October 1981) is a retired Ivorian-born Burkinabé footballer who played as a defender.

== Career ==
Kouassi played club football for FC Libourne, captaining the club through its first season in Ligue 2.
