= Torkilstrup Church =

Coordinates: 54°52′16″N 11°55′51″E

- Torkilstrup Kirke
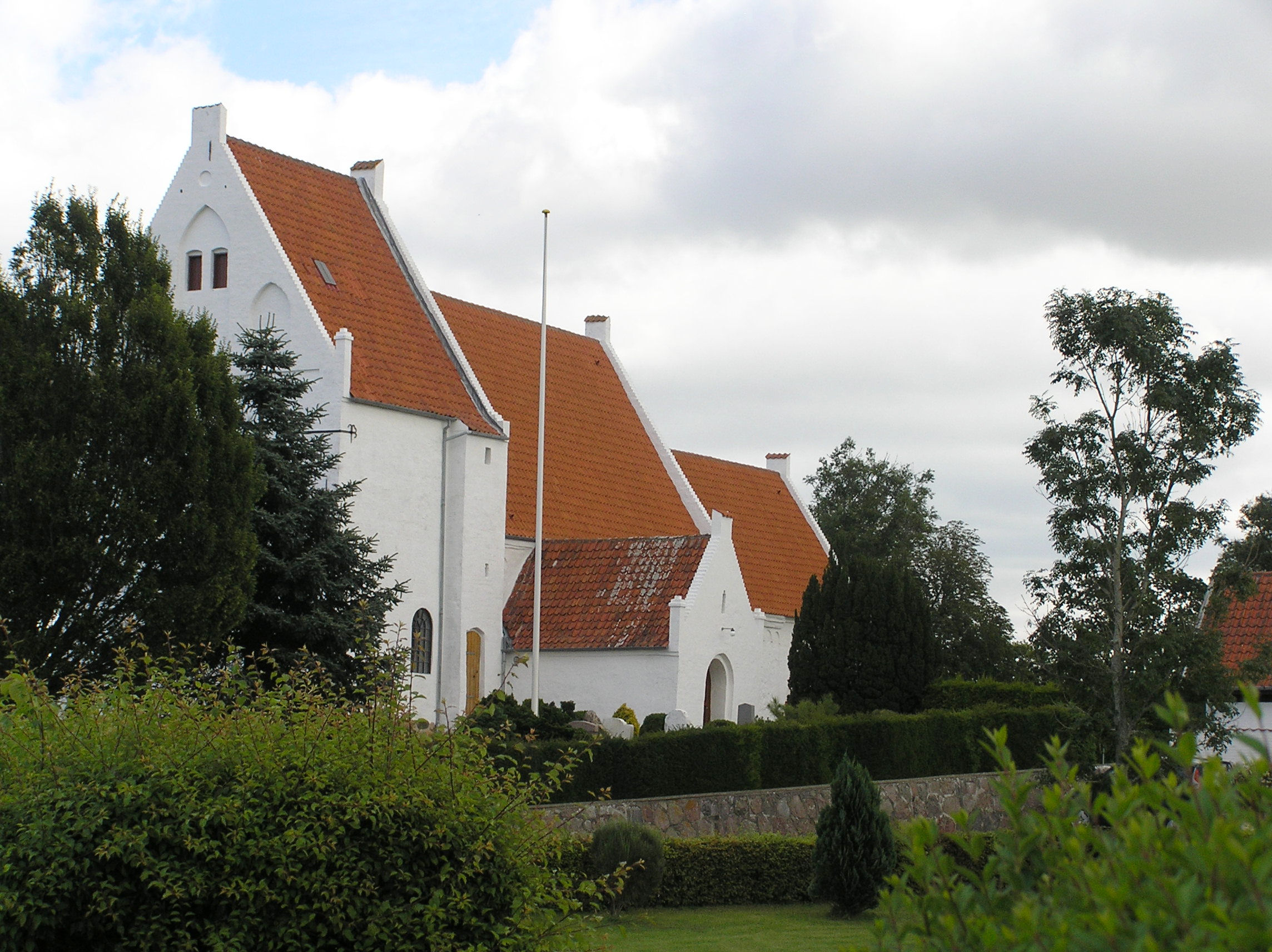
- Torkilstrup Church
- Location: Torkilstrup, Falster
- Country: Denmark
- Denomination: Church of Denmark

Architecture
- Architectural type: Romanesque architecture, Gothic architecture
- Completed: ca. 1160

Administration
- Diocese: Diocese of Lolland–Falster
- Deanery: Falster Provsti
- Parish: Torkilstrup Sogn

Torkilstrup Church (Danish: Torkilstrup Kirke) is located in the village of Torkilstrup some 7 km (4 mi) southeast of Nørre Alslev, on the Danish island of Falster. It is built of hewn fieldstone rather than brick, indicating it is one of the oldest churches on the island from before 1160.

== Architecture ==
The west part of the chancel and the nave from the Romanesque period are built of hewn fieldstone with a few limestone trimmings. Rounded-arch friezes, sometimes with ornamental lilies, decorate the north and south walls of the nave, indicating an early design. The round-arched south door is still in use while the north door is bricked up. In addition to the Romanesque window in the chancel, there are traces of Romanesque windows in the nave's north wall. The extension of chancel possibly occurred as early as the 14th century but could have been during the Late Gothic period when the tower and porch were added. One of the bells in the tower is dated 1491.

== Interior ==
The low Romanesque chancel arch was probably adapted when cross-vaulting was added to the nave in the Gothic period. Traces of frescos from the second half of the 15th century have been found in the vaults. The altarpiece (1650) is the work of Jørgen Ringnis, as is the pulpit (1640). The altar painting (1840) is by Lucie Marie Ingemann, depicting the Bible story Suffer the little children to come unto me. An Early Gothic crucifix from c. 1300 hangs in the church. B. S. Ingemann's father, Søren Ingemann, is buried under the floor in the west section of the nave. The almost barrel-shaped Romanesque font of sculpted granite has a rope-shaped rim.

== Gallery ==
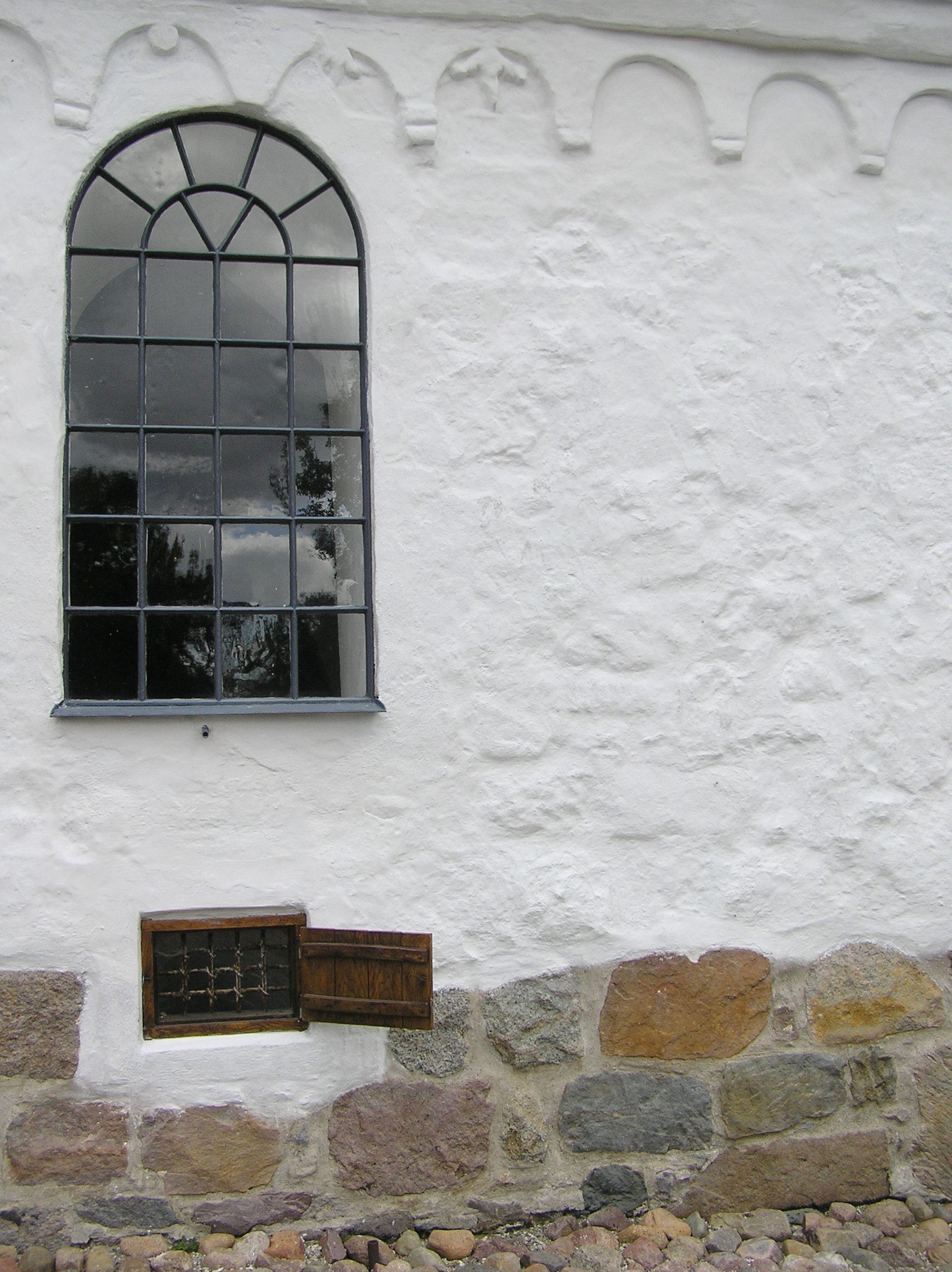
Romanesque frieze

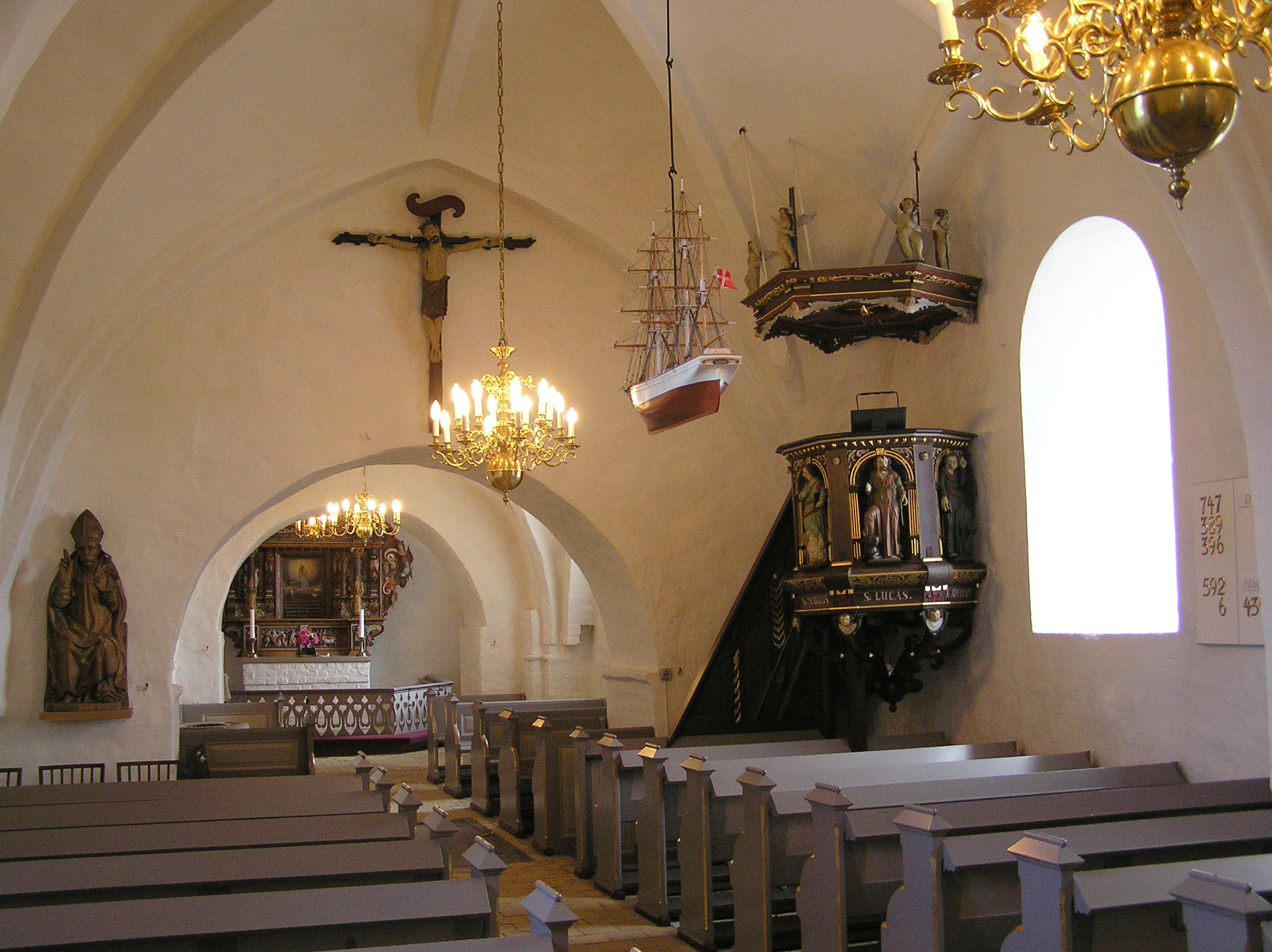
Nave and pulpit (1640)

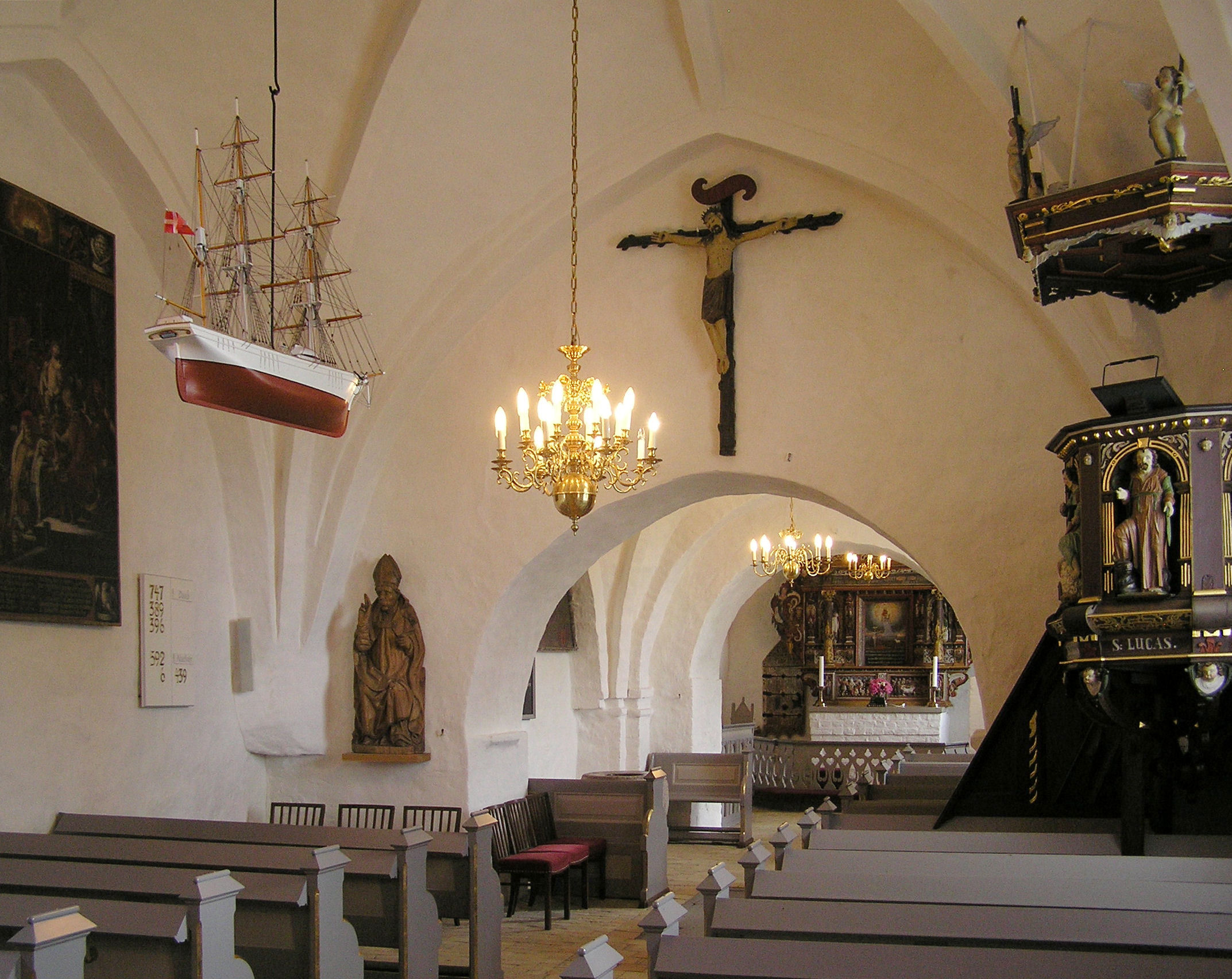
Nave and oold crucifix

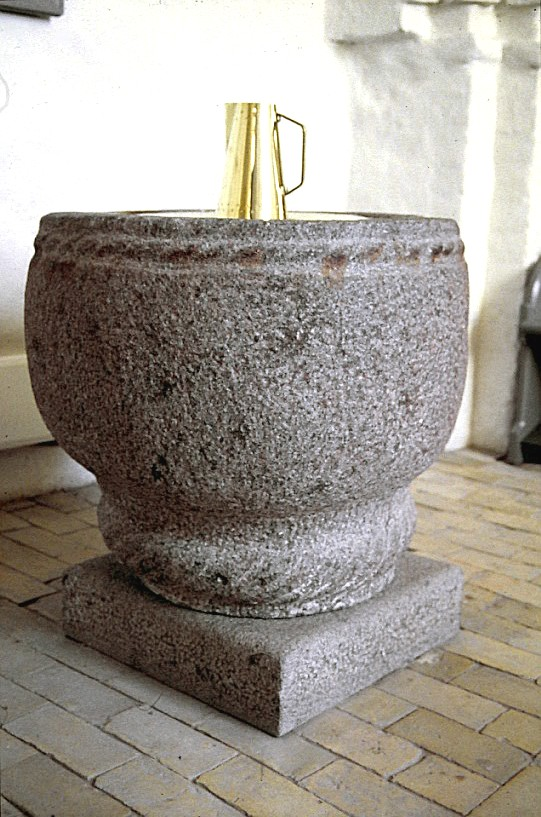
Romanesque font

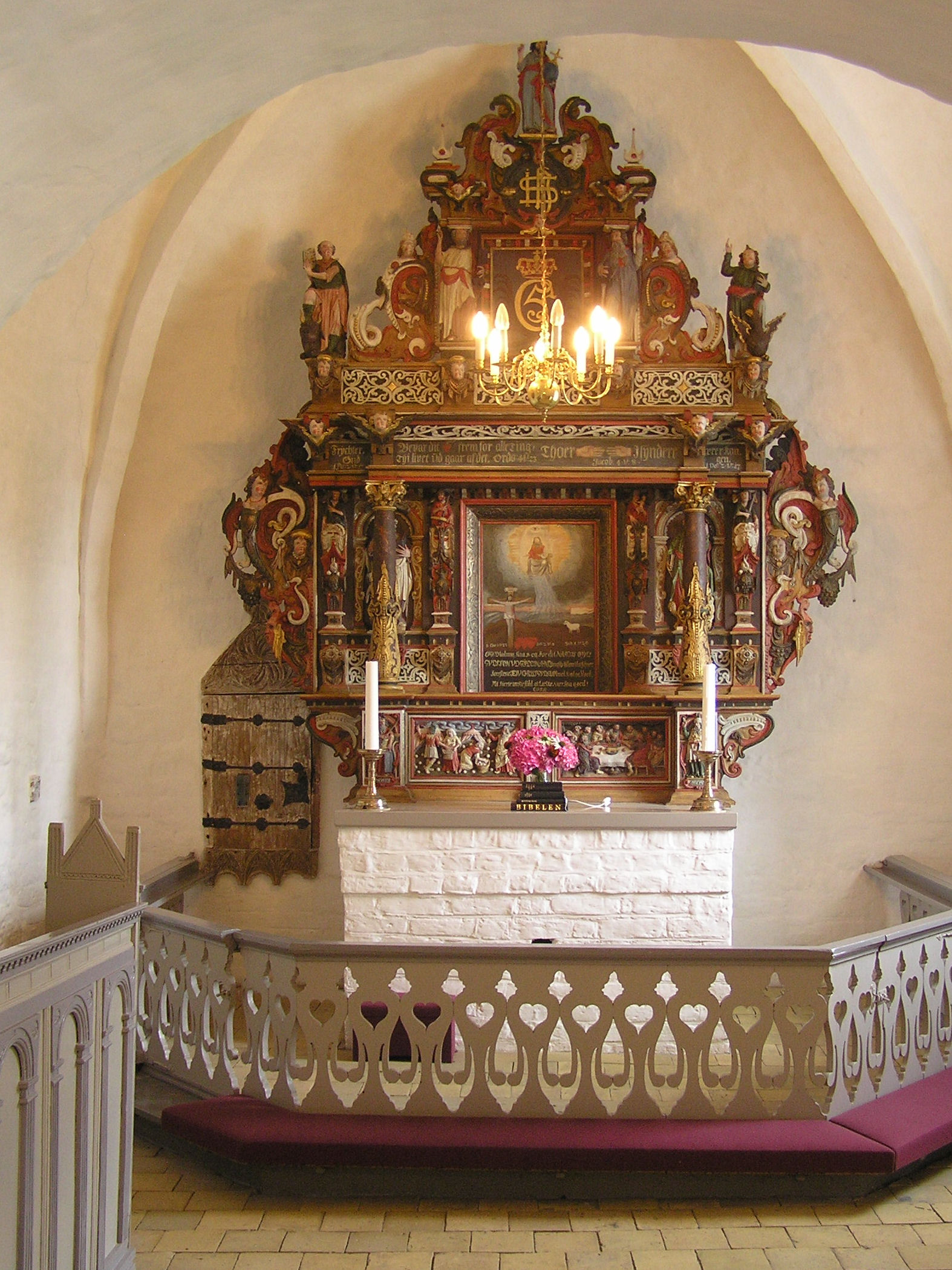
Altarpiece (1650)
