= Euphrasie Kouassi Yao =

Ivorian Minister of Women's Rights, Family, and Infants

Special advisor to the president in charge of gender
- Incumbent
- Assumed office March 2017
- President: Alassane Ouattara
- Prime Minister: Amadou Gon Coulibaly

Minister for the Promotion of Women, Family and Child Protection
- In office January 2016 – January 2017
- President: Alassane Ouattara
- Prime Minister: Daniel Kablan Duncan

Personal details
- Born: 18 April 1964 (age 61)

Euphrasie Kouassi Yao (also Yao Kouassi, born 18 April 1964) is an Ivorian politician, who is the current special advisor to president Alassane Ouattara in charge of gender. She has also served as the Minister for the Promotion of Women, Family and Child Protection, and as a UNESCO chair on their committee on Water, Women and Decision-making.

== Personal life ==
Kouassi Yao has a master's degree in Gender and Development from the Université de l'Atlantique d'Abidjan in Cote D'Ivoire. Her brother Jean Claude Kouassi has also been a minister in the Ivorian government.

== Career ==
In January 2016, Kouassi Yao was appointed the minister for the Promotion de la Femme, de la Famille et de la Protection de l’Enfant (Promotion of Women, Family and Child Protection) by then Prime Minister Daniel Kablan Duncan. Whilst in the role, she encouraged women to register to vote in the 2016 Ivorian parliamentary election. She was removed from the role in January 2017. In March 2017, she became a special advisor to president Alassane Ouattara, in charge of gender. She has focused on promoting peace after the Second Ivorian Civil War, in particular commemorating women who provided food for their families during the conflict. She promotes the organisation Amour, Solidarité et Audace (Love, Solidarity and Boldness) which has brought together 15,000 Ivorian women of different ethnic backgrounds and religions. In 2018, she spoke on French television channel TV5Monde about women's development in Africa. She has supported the government in its attempts to prosecute those who participate in female genital mutilation.

In the Ivory Coast, Kouassi Yao has also worked as the National Director of Equality and Promotion of Gender, Technical Advisor to the Minister of Women, Member of the board of directors of the National Office of Drinking Water, National Coordinator of the Compendium of Female Skills, and as co-ordinator of the Compendium of Women's Competences of Côte d'Ivoire. She has also worked for UNESCO as a chair on their committee on Water, Women and Decision-making.

For 2019 International Women's Day, Kouassi Yao was one of 20 Ivorian women honoured by the Global Platform for Enterprising Women. She was described as an "influential and inspiring woman". In December 2021, she released a book Le secret d'une aventure (The secret of an adventure) . The book detailed her roles in the government between 2004 and 2011.
