= Yaw-rate sensor =

Device that measures a vehicle's angular velocity

A yaw-rate sensor is a gyroscopic device that measures a vehicle's yaw rate, its angular velocity around its vertical axis. The angle between the vehicle's heading and velocity is called its slip angle, which is related to the yaw rate.

== Types ==
There are two types of yaw-rate sensors: piezoelectric and micromechanical.

In the piezoelectric type, the sensor is a tuning fork-shaped structure with four piezoelectric elements, two on top and two below. When the slip angle is zero (no slip), the upper elements produce no voltage as no Coriolis force acts on them. But when cornering, the rotational movement causes the upper part of the tuning fork to leave the oscillatory plane, creating an alternating voltage (and thus an alternating current) proportional to the yaw rate and oscillatory speed. The output signal's sign depends on the direction of rotation.

In the micromechanical type, the Coriolis acceleration is measured by a micromechanical capacitive acceleration sensor placed on an oscillating element. This acceleration is proportional to the product of the yaw rate and oscillatory velocity, the latter of which is maintained electronically at a constant value.

== Applications ==
Yaw rate sensors are used in aircraft and electronic stability control systems in cars.

== See also ==
- Attitude dynamics and control
- Ship motions
- Aircraft principal axes
