= List of islands of Denmark =

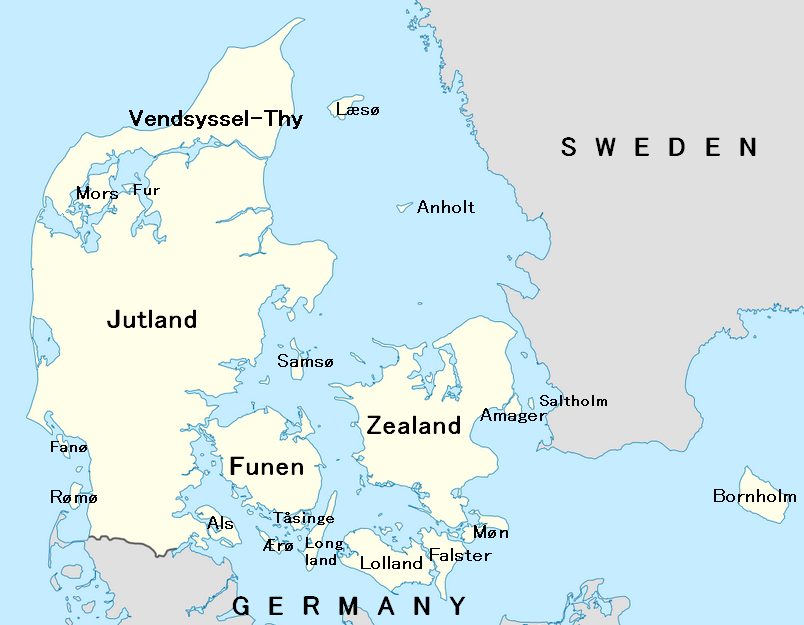
A map showing the Jutland Peninsula and most notable larger islands of Denmark.

This is a list of islands of Denmark, specifically those forming the Danish archipelago just off the European continent.

== Overview ==
There are around 1,400 islands in Denmark, 409 of which are named, not including the Faroe Islands or Greenland. 70 of these islands are inhabited. Some islands became depopulated only in recent decades, either for economic reasons, as lighthouses and other publicly-run facilities became automated, or because their population relocated to larger islands or to the Jutland peninsula. Others became uninhabited as living costs outpaced income for the often fewer than 10 locals.

=== Definition ===
Different lists of Danish islands vary, depending on how the word "island" is defined. According to the official Danish Government definition, an "island" needs to be surrounded by water at least one-half metre deep, and also to have land vegetation.

Another common criterion is that an "island" needs to be surrounded by free-flowing, natural water and not just an artificial, narrow canal. According to this criterion, places such as Christianshavn and Holmen in Copenhagen, although sometimes referred to as artificial islands, are actually parts of the island of Amager.

=== Dynamic number ===
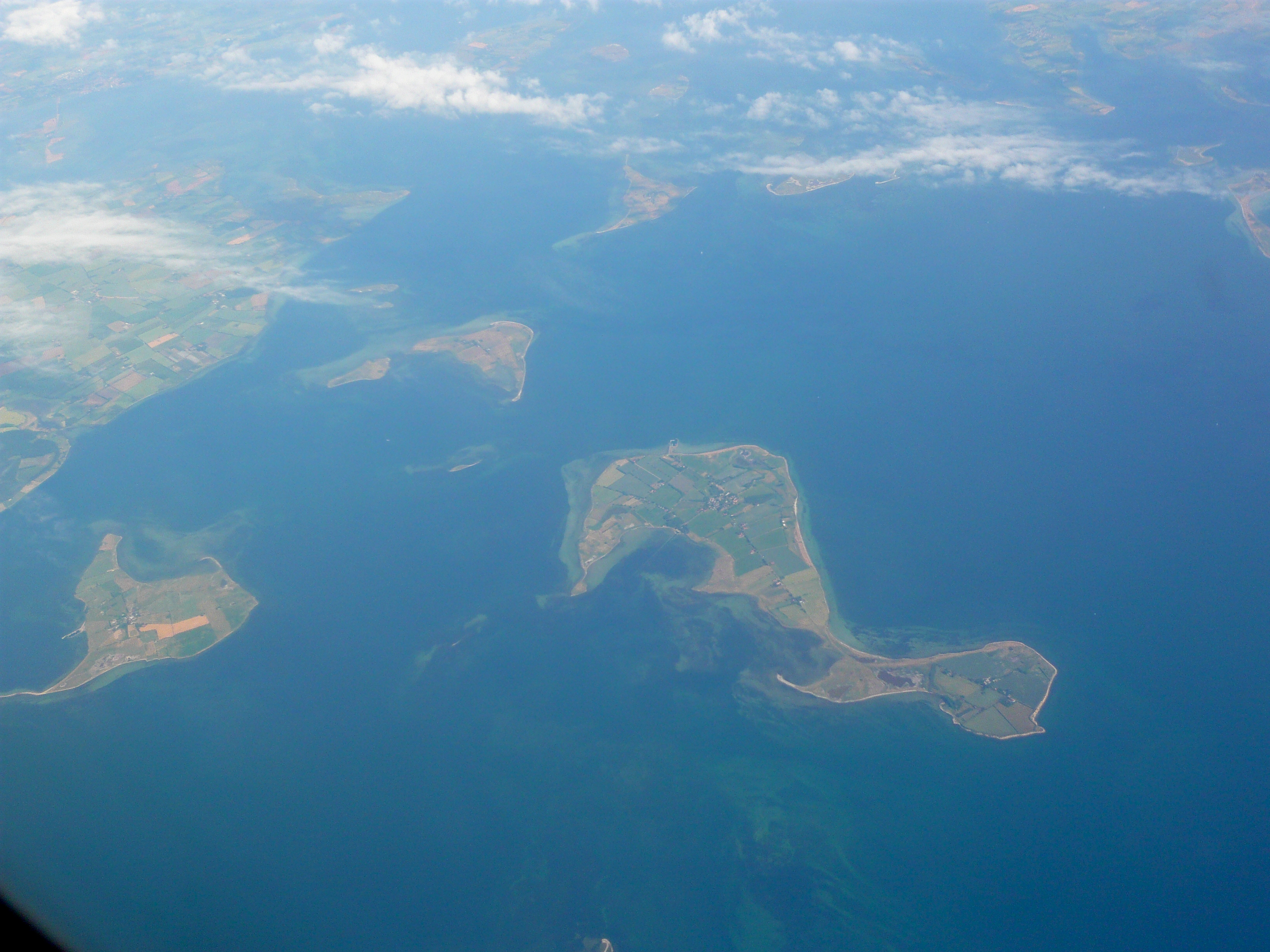
Drejø, Hjortø and Skarø seen from above

The number of islands in Denmark changes from time to time. New islands are occasionally formed by sedimentation. Several examples of these new islands are found in the waters around Æbelø, north of Funen, including Drætlingen which formed in the late 1990s, and a still unnamed islet that was registered in 2008. These new islands are generally less stable than larger, morainic islands, and may later disappear again. Other islands are created artificially. Peberholm, formed in the process of construction of the Øresund Bridge, is a notable example. Other artificial Danish islands include a number of marine fortresses off Copenhagen, such as Middelgrundsfortet, Trekroner Fort and Flakfortet.

Islands may also disappear. An example of this is Jordsand, one of the Danish Wadden Sea Islands. According to records from 1231, the island then had an area of about 2,000 hectares (8 square miles). After a series of severe storms during that century, its area decreased to around 41 hectares, and by 1763 to around 18 hectares. By December 1999, the European windstorm Cyclone Anatol had destroyed the last piece of the island and Jordsand had ceased to exist.

In other cases, islands are absorbed by larger neighbouring masses of dry land, as a result of either natural sedimentation or artificial land reclamation in the channels separating them. Sometimes this means that an island becomes a cape or headland, or a peninsula as is the case of the former island of Reersø.

Denmark's second largest island, the North Jutlandic Island, was not always an island. A storm on 3 February 1825 penetrated the narrow land mass, Agger Tange, and thus separated Northern Jutland from the rest of Jutland. The area had earlier been an island, when a strait at Vust had been open prior to the 12th century.

== List of 100 largest Danish islands ==
This is a list of the 100 largest islands of Denmark (press the symbol after the headings in the table to rearrange the list according to population size, location or alphabetically):

| Rank | Island's name | Area | | Population (1 January 2013) | Location |
| Rank | Island's name | km^{2} | sq mi | Population (1 January 2013) | Location |
|---|---|---|---|---|---|
| 1 | Zealand | 7,031 | 2,715 | 2,208,348 | Baltic Sea / Kattegat / Øresund / Great Belt |
| 2 | North Jutlandic Island (Vendsyssel-Thy) | 4,685 | 1,809 | 297 886 | North Sea / Kattegat / Skagerrak / Limfjord |
| 3 | Funen | 2,985 | 1,153 | 456,128 | Great Belt / Little Belt / Kattegat / South Funen Archipelago |
| 4 | Lolland | 1,243 | 480 | 62,578 | Baltic Sea / Smålandsfarvandet / Storstrømmen |
| 5 | Bornholm | 588 | 227 | 40,715 | Baltic Sea |
| 6 | Falster | 514 | 198 | 42,544 | Baltic Sea / Storstrømmen |
| 7 | Mors | 368 | 142 | 21,163 | Limfjord |
| 8 | Als | 321 | 124 | 50,682 | Little Belt |
| 9 | Langeland | 284 | 110 | 12,644 | Great Belt |
| 10 | Møn | 218 | 84 | 9,580 | Baltic Sea |
| 11 | Rømø | 129 | 50 | 618 | Wadden Sea, North Sea |
| 12 | Samsø | 112 | 43 | 3,806 | Kattegat |
| 13 | Læsø | 101 | 39 | 1,839 | Kattegat |
| 14 | Amager | 95.3 | 36.8 | 180,657 | Øresund |
| 15 | Ærø | 88 | 34 | 6,516 | South Funen Archipelago |
| 16 | Tåsinge | 70 | 27 | 6,174 | South Funen Archipelago |
| 17 | Fanø | 56 | 22 | 3,237 | Wadden Sea, North Sea |
| 18 | Fur | 22 | 8.5 | 826 | Limfjorden |
| 19 | Anholt | 22 | 8.5 | 169 | Kattegat |
| 20 | Fejø | 16 | 6.2 | 464 | Smålandsfarvandet |
| 21 | Saltholm | 16.0 | 6.2 | 1 | Øresund |
| 22 | Orø | 15 | 5.8 | 846 | Isefjorden |
| 23 | Endelave | 13.1 | 5.1 | 176 | Kattegat |
| 24 | Bogø | 13.0 | 5.0 | 1,108 | Storstrømmen |
| 25 | Sejerø | 12.4 | 4.8 | 348 | Kattegat |
| 26 | Femø | 11.0 | 4.2 | 123 | Smålandsfarvandet |
| 27 | Jegindø | 7.9 | 3.1 | 464 | Limfjord |
| 28 | Mandø | 7.6 | 2.9 | 41 | Wadden Sea, North Sea |
| 29 | Thurø | 7.5 | 2.9 | 3,595 | South Funen Archipelago |
| 30 | Alrø | 7.5 | 2.9 | 147 | Horsens Fjord |
| 31 | Agersø | 7.0 | 2.7 | 181 | Great Belt |
| 32 | Venø | 6.5 | 2.5 | 190 | Limfjord |
| 33 | Bågø | 6.2 | 2.4 | 27 | Little Belt |
| 34 | Lyø | 6.0 | 2.3 | 101 | South Funen Archipelago |
| 35 | Egholm | 6 | 2.3 | 48 | Limfjord |
| 36 | Avernakø | 5.9 | 2.3 | 114 | South Funen Archipelago |
| 37 | Årø | 5.7 | 2.2 | 157 | Little Belt |
| 38 | Glænø | 5.6 | 2.2 | 51 | Smålandsfarvandet |
| 39 | Gavnø | 5.5 | 2.1 | 31 | Great Belt |
| 40 | Strynø | 4.9 | 1.9 | 202 | South Funen Archipelago |
| 41 | Nyord | 4.8 | 1.9 | 41 | Baltic Sea |
| 42 | Omø | 4.5 | 1.7 | 154 | Great Belt |
| 43 | Drejø | 4.3 | 1.7 | 64 | South Funen Archipelago |
| 44 | Fænø | 3.9 | 1.5 | 2 | Little Belt |
| 45 | Agerø | 3.8 | 1.5 | 26 | Limfjord |
| 46 | Tunø | 3.5 | 1.4 | 109 | Kattegat |
| 47 | Enø | 3.4 | 1.3 | 332 | Smålandsfarvandet |
| 48 | Livø | 3.3 | 1.3 | 9 | Limfjord |
| 49 | Hjarnø | 3.2 | 1.2 | 104 | Kattegat |
| 50 | Askø | 2.82 | 1.09 | 37 | Smålandsfarvandet |
| 51 | Æbelø | 2.50 | 0.97 | - | Kattegat |
| 52 | Barsø | 2.50 | 0.97 | 22 | Little Belt |
| 53 | Nekselø | 2.20 | 0.85 | 18 | Kattegat (Sejerøbugten) |
| 54 | Brandsø | 2.00 | 0.77 | - | Little Belt |
| 55 | Skarø | 1.97 | 0.76 | 33 | South Funen Archipelago |
| 56 | Tærø | 1.73 | 0.67 | 1 | Storstrømmen |
| 57 | Masnedø | 1.68 | 0.65 | 129 | Storstrømmen |
| 58 | Vejrø | 1.57 | 0.61 | 5 | Storstrømmen |
| 59 | Bjørnø | 1.50 | 0.58 | 32 | South Funen Archipelago |
| 60 | Sprogø | 1.50 | 0.58 | - | Great Belt |
| 61 | Eskilsø | 1.39 | 0.54 | 6 | Roskilde Fjord |
| 62 | Dybsø | 1.34 | 0.52 | - | Smålandsfarvandet |
| 63 | Vigelsø | 1.32 | 0.51 | - | Odense Fjord |
| 64 | Siø | 1.31 | 0.51 | 15 | South Funen Archipelago |
| 65 | Langø | 1.30 | 0.50 | 2 | Storstrømmen |
| 66 | Peberholm | 1.3 | 0.50 | - | Øresund |
| 67 | Romsø | 1.09 | 0.42 | - | Great Belt |
| 68 | Skalø | 1.06 | 0.41 | - | Smålandsfarvandet |
| 69 | Enehøje | 1.04 | 0.40 | - | Nakskov Fjord |
| 70 | Langli | 1.00 | 0.39 | - | Wadden Sea, North Sea |
| 71 | Hjortø | 0.90 | 0.35 | 8 | South Funen Archipelago |
| 72 | Farø | 0.93 | 0.36 | 5 | Storstrømmen |
| 73 | Birkholm | 0.92 | 0.36 | 11 | South Funen Archipelago |
| 74 | Illumø | 0.90 | 0.35 | - | South Funen Archipelago (Helnæsbugten) |
| 75 | Lilleø | 0.86 | 0.33 | 7 | Storstrømmen |
| 76 | Rågø | 0.80 | 0.31 | - | Smålandsfarvandet |
| 77 | Hesselø | 0.71 | 0.27 | - | Kattegat |
| 78 | Store Egholm | 0.70 | 0.27 | - | South Funen Archipelago |
| 79 | Hjelm | 0.63 | 0.24 | - | Kattegat |
| 80 | Vorsø | 0.6 | 0.23 | 1 | Horsens Fjord |
| 81 | Halmø | 0.50 | 0.19 | - | South Funen Archipelago |
| 82 | Strynø Kalv | 0.50 | 0.19 | - | South Funen Archipelago (Helnæsbugten) |
| 83 | Fjandø | 0.40 | 0.15 | - | Nissum Fjord |
| 84 | Vejlø | 0.37 | 0.14 | - | Nakskov Fjord |
| 85 | Mejlø | 0.34 | 0.13 | - | Kattegat / Great Belt |
| 86 | Draget | 0.28 | 0.11 | - | Kattegat (off Bogense) |
| 87 | Store Svelmø | 0.27 | 0.10 | - | South Funen Archipelago |
| 88 | Christiansø | 0.25 | 0.097 | 92 (Note: Including Frederiksø.) | Baltic Sea |
| 89 | Kalvø, Guldborgsund | 0.22 | 0.085 | - | Baltic Sea (Guldborgsund) |
| 90 | Slotsholmen | 0.21 | 0.081 | 14 | Øresund |
| 91 | Tornø | 0.21 | 0.081 | 4 | Odense Fjord |
| 92 | Græsholm, Hirsholmene | 0.21 | 0.081 | 3 | Kattegat |
| 93 | Vigø | 0.20 | 0.077 | - | South Funen Archipelago (Helnæsbugten) |
| 94 | Slotø | 0.20 | 0.077 | - | Nakskov Fjord |
| 95 | Hjælmshoved | 0.20 | 0.077 | - | South Funen Archipelago |
| 96 | Kalvø, Genner Bugt | 0.17 | 0.066 | 13 | Little Belt |
| 97 | Hirsholm | 0.17 | 0.066 | 3 | Kattegat |
| 98 | Ejlinge | 0.16 | 0.062 | - | Kattegat |
| 99 | Møgelø | 0.14 | 0.054 | - | Julsø |

== Other populated islands ==
- Frederiksø - see Christiansø above
- Lindø
- Klavs Nars Holm

== Areas sometimes referred to as islands ==
- Jordsand, a former island
- Christianshavn, considered part of Amager Island
- Holmen, considered part of Christianshavn/Amager

== Other small unpopulated islands ==
- Lindholm, Stege Bugt (which has a medical research facility)

== See also ==
- Danish Straits
- Faroe Islands
- Greenland
- List of islands in the Atlantic Ocean
- Lists of islands
