= Sydhavsøerne =

Archipelago in Denmark

Danish South Sea Islands
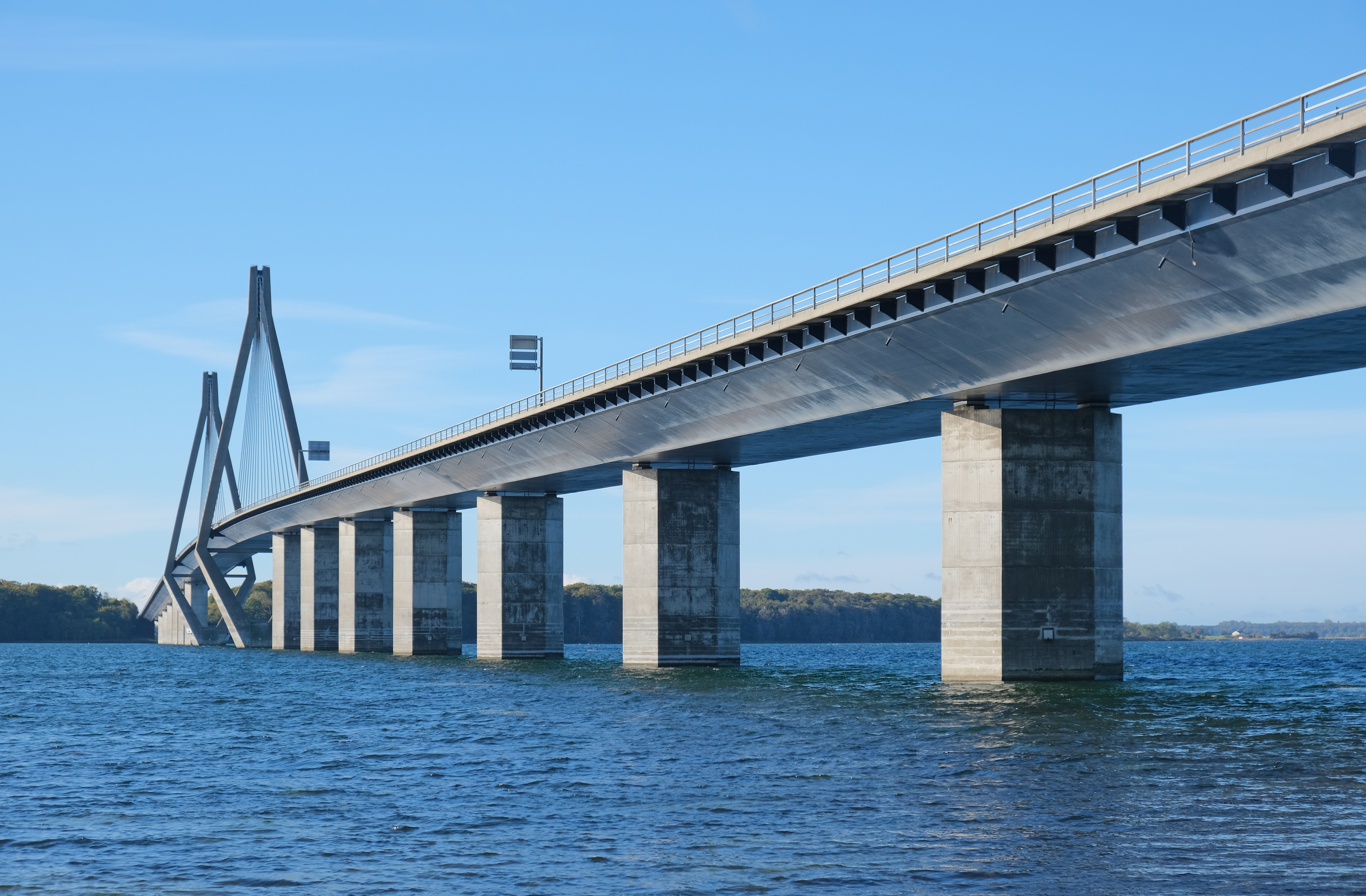
- The southern Farø Bridge between Farø and Falster, an important gateway to the area
- Interactive map of Danish South Sea Islands

Geography
- Location: Baltic Sea
- Coordinates: 54°48′N 11°44′E
- Total islands: +30
- Major islands: Lolland, Falster, Møn

Administration
- Denmark
- Region: Region Zealand
- Municipalities: Guldborgsund Municipality; Lolland Municipality; Vordingborg Municipality; Næstved Municipality

Demographics
- Ethnic groups: Danes

Sydhavsøerne (lit. "The South Sea Islands"), sometimes also referred to simply as Lolland-Falster from the two largest islands, is an informal but common term used in Danish to refer to the archipelago just south of Zealand, Denmark's largest island where its capital Copenhagen is located. Part of the Baltic Sea, the term covers Lolland, Falster and Møn as well as the numerous smaller islands of the surrounding straits, fjords and waters.

The name is a parody on the similar Danish name for the South Pacific Islands of Micronesia, Melanesia and Polynesia.

The name is used by Radio Sydhavsøerne, the local radio station covering the area.

== The area ==
The islands are characterised by a mild climate, making them particularly well suited for fruit growing. This is celebrated every year during Sydhavsøerne's Fruit Festival.

== Islands of the area ==
Apart from the three main islands Lolland, Falster and Møn, the archipelago includes:

In Smålandsfarvandet north of Lolland:

- Fejø
- Femø
- Askø
- Vejrø
- Skalø
- Lilleø
- Rågø (83 ha)
- Rågø Kalv (15 ha)
- Lindholm
- Havneø
- Vigsø
- Dyrefod

In Guldborgsund between Lolland and Falster:

- Kalvø (22 ha)
- Barholme

In Storstrømmen between Zealand and Falster:

- Farø
- Masnedø
- Bogø

In Ulvsund between Zealand and Møn:

- Tærø
- Langø
- Lindholm

In Nakskov Fjord:

- Enehøje (93 ha)
- Vejlø (37 ha)
- Slotø (20 ha)
- Barneholm ( 8.5 ha)
- Dueholm
- Munkeholm
- Kåreholm
- Rommerholm

Other islands:

- Enø (off Zealand)
- Glænø (off Zealand)
- Nyord (off Møn)

== See also ==
- List of islands of Denmark
- South Funen Archipelago
- Danish Wadden Sea Islands
