= Helnæs =

Island on the coast of Denmark

Coordinates: 55°8′22″N 10°0′2″E

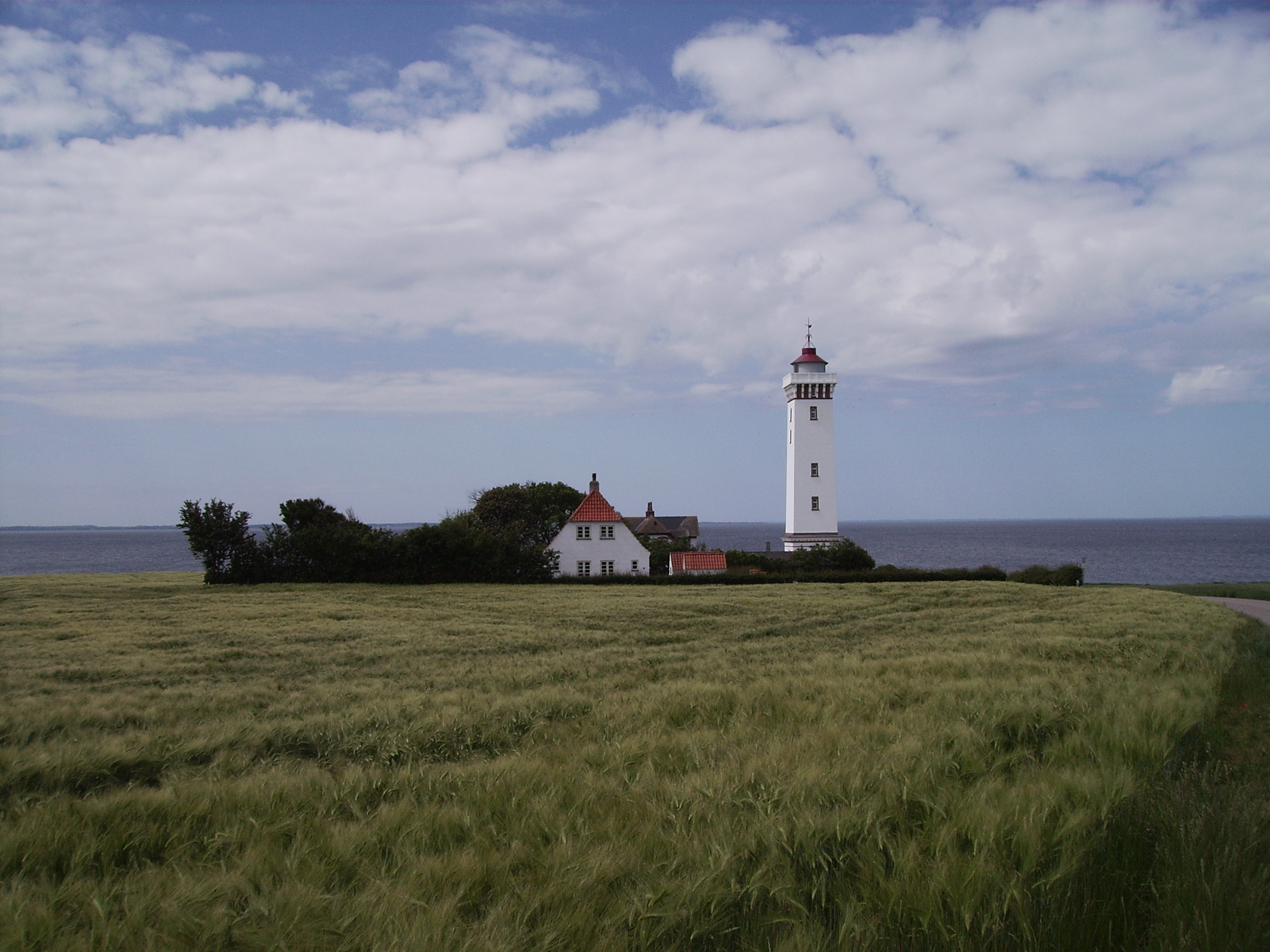
- Helnæs Lighthouse

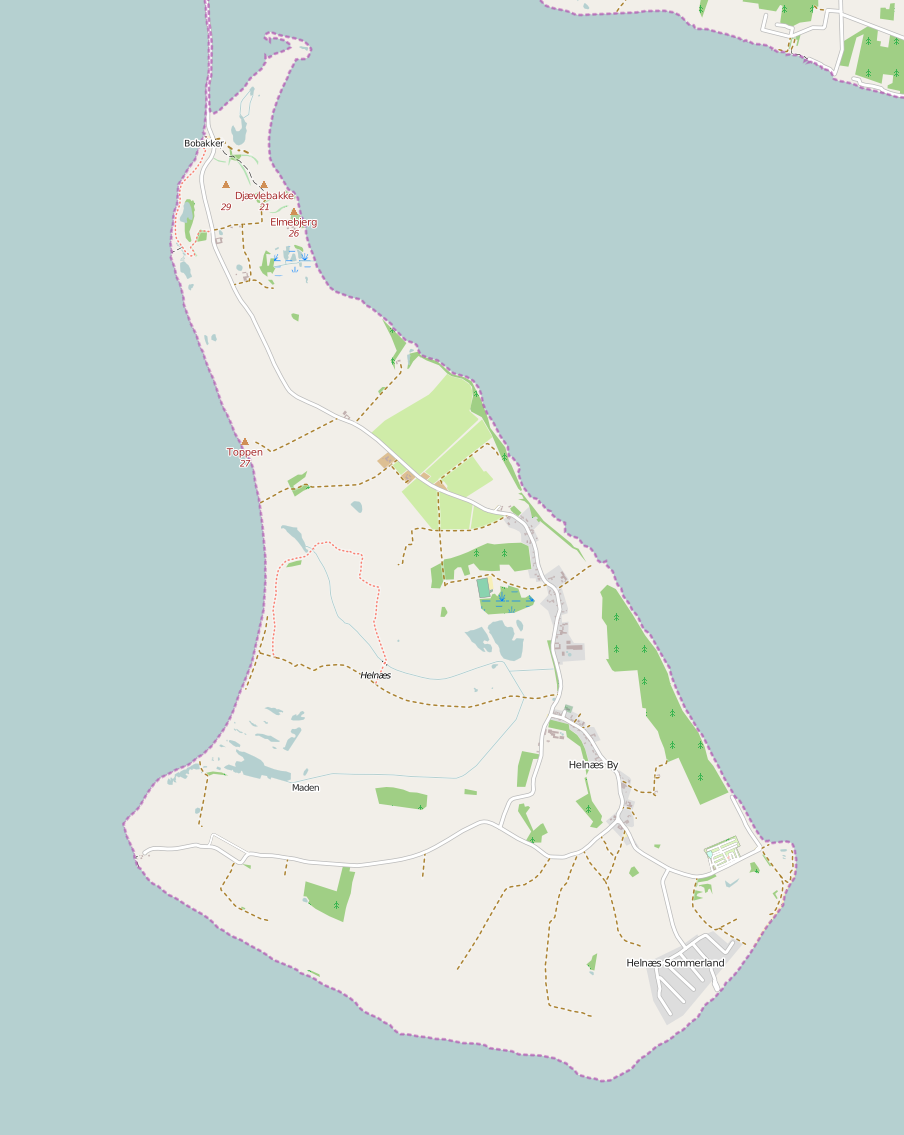

Geography
- Location: Little Belt
- Highest elevation: 8.8 m (28.9 ft)

Administration
- Denmark
- Region: Region of Southern Denmark
- Municipality: Assens Municipality

Helnæs is an island on the southwestern coast of Funen, Denmark, southwest of Haarby and northwest of Faaborg. It belongs administratively to Assens Municipality and is connected to the town of Assens by road to the north.

== Geography ==
Between Helnæs and the main island of Funen is Helnæs Bay, which contains the sprawling islands of Illumø, Horsehoved and Vigø to the southeast. The principal settlement of Helnæs lies on the southeast coast, and contains the camping site Helnæs Camping to the north of it, although the historical village of Helnæs By is further to the north, inland. The highest point of the island is Galgebakke, at 29 feet (8.8 m).

== Landmarks ==
There is a runestone on the island, known as the Helnæs Runestone. The 28 metres (92 ft) high Helnæs Lighthouse was completed in 1901.

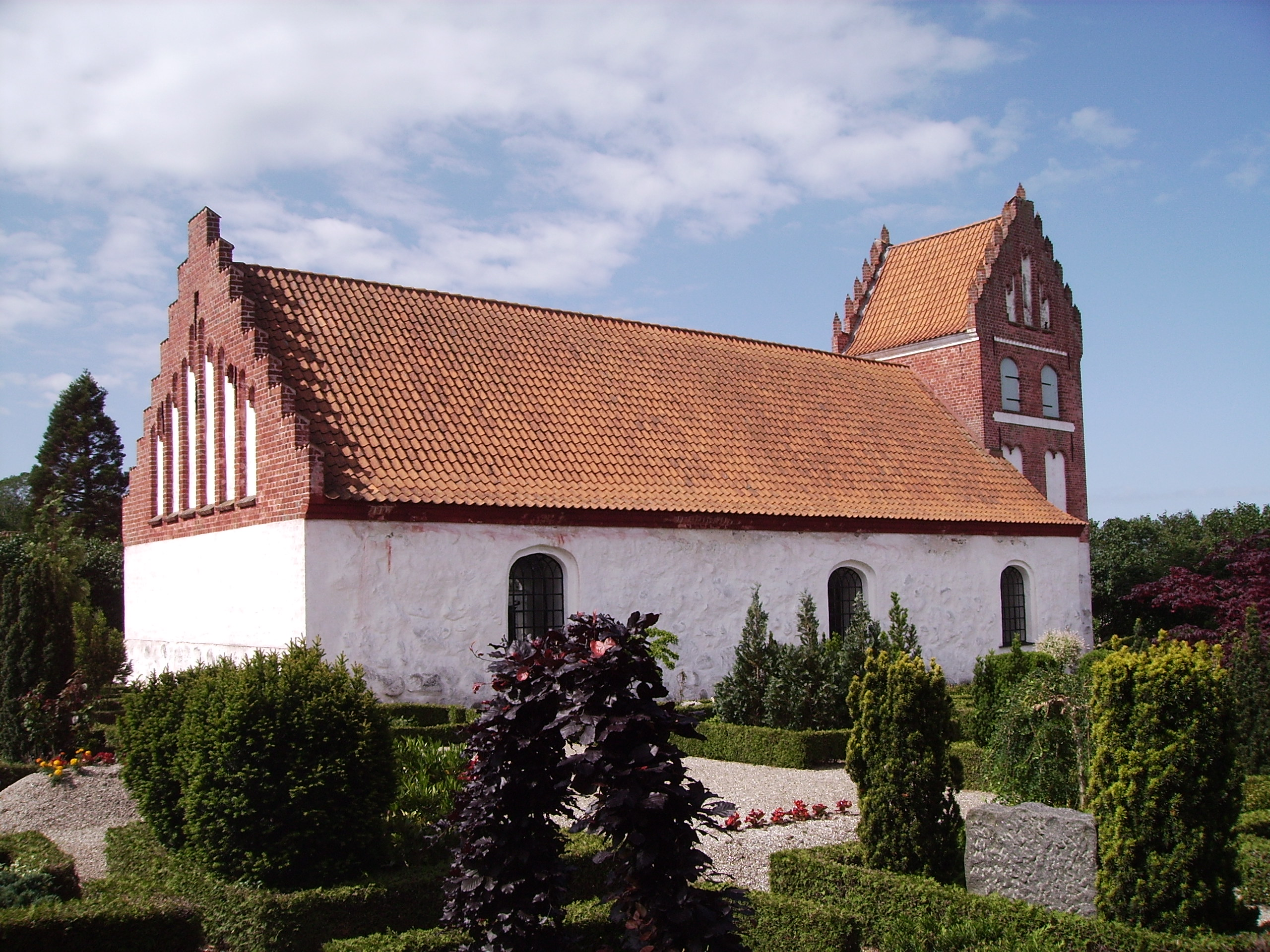
Helnæs Church

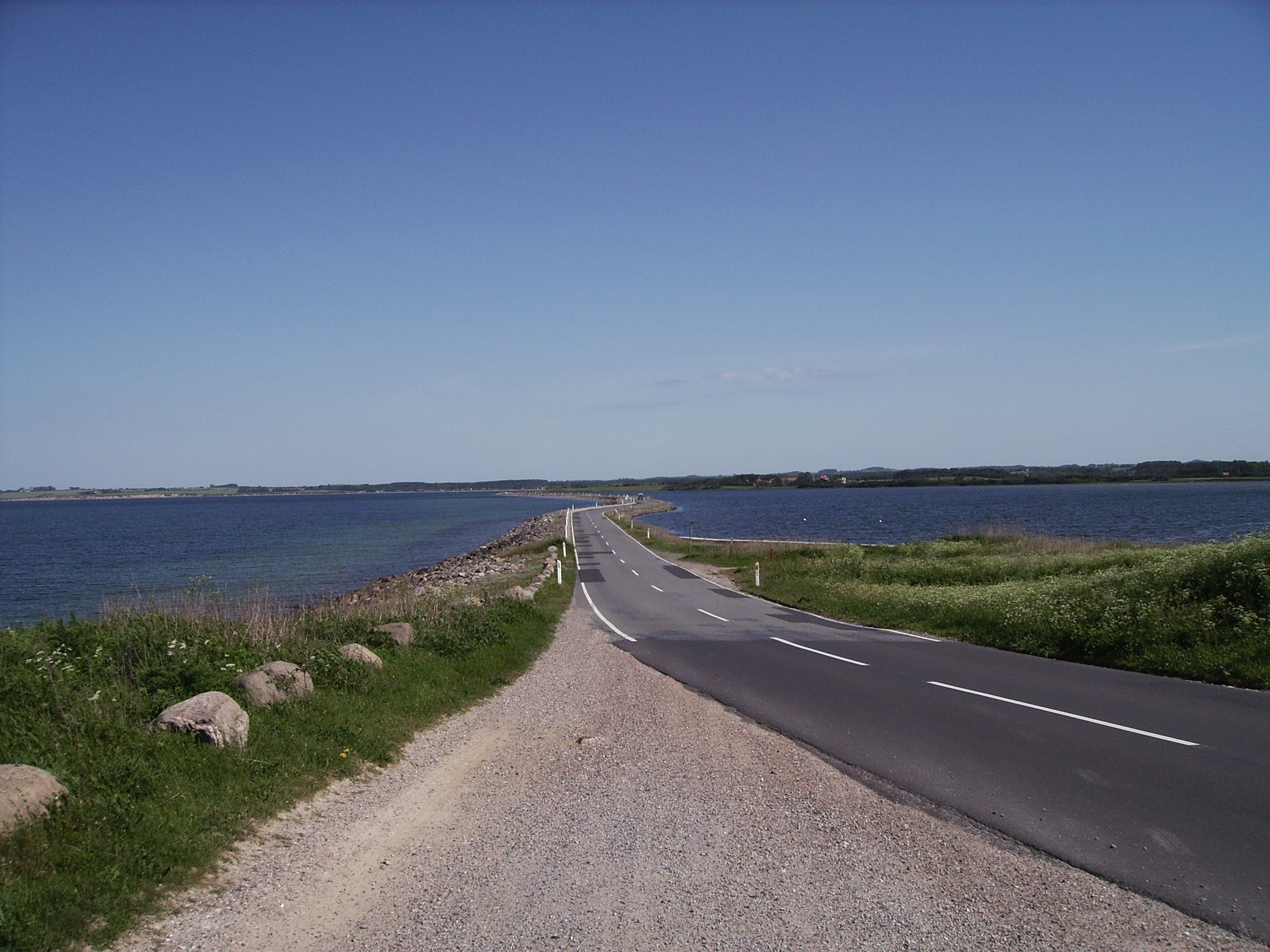
Road from the mainland
