= Bågø =

Island in the Little Belt, Denmark

Coordinates: 55°18′30″N 9°49′0″E

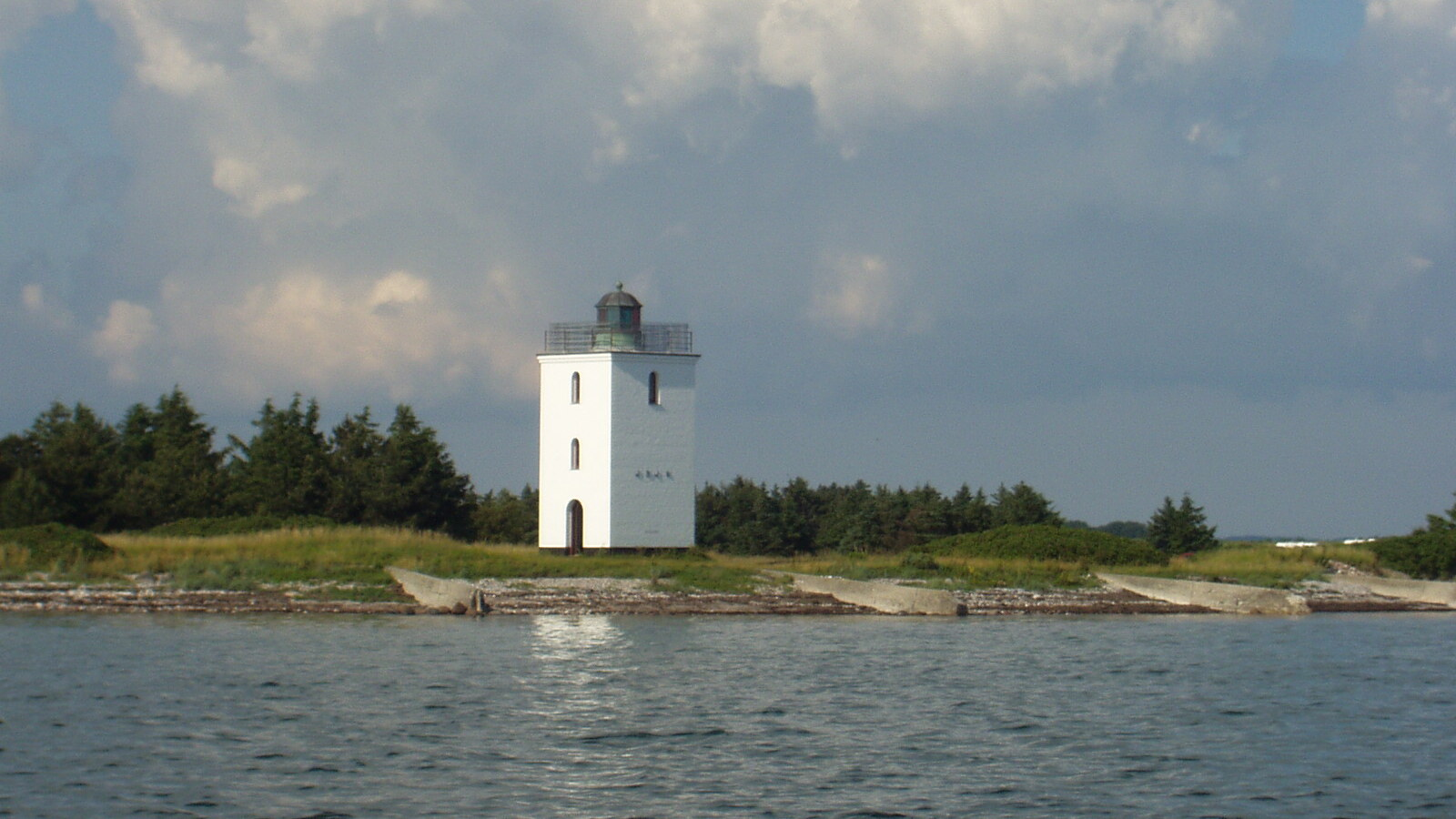
- Bågø Lighthouse

- Location within Denmark

Geography
- Location: Little Belt
- Area: 6.2 km^{2} (2.4 sq mi)

Administration
- Denmark
- Region: South Denmark Region
- Municipality: Assens Municipality

Demographics
- Population: 25 (01.01.2015)
- Pop. density: 5.6/km^{2} (14.5/sq mi)

Bågø is a small Danish island located in the Little Belt 5 km north-west of Assens on the island of Funen belonging to Assens Municipality. With an area of 6.2 km^{2} (2.4 sq mi), as of 1 January 2015 it has a population of 25. The island is divided into three low slopes reaching a maximum height of 8 meters above sea level. Essentially an agricultural community, the island's population has decreased drastically since 1950. The village, Bågø By, with its large farm houses lies at the centre of the island. There is a ferry connection with Assens.

== Location ==
On a clear day, a number of other islands can be seen from Bågø: Als to the south, Årø and Bastholm to the west and Brandsø to the north. Funen lies to the east and Jutland to the west.

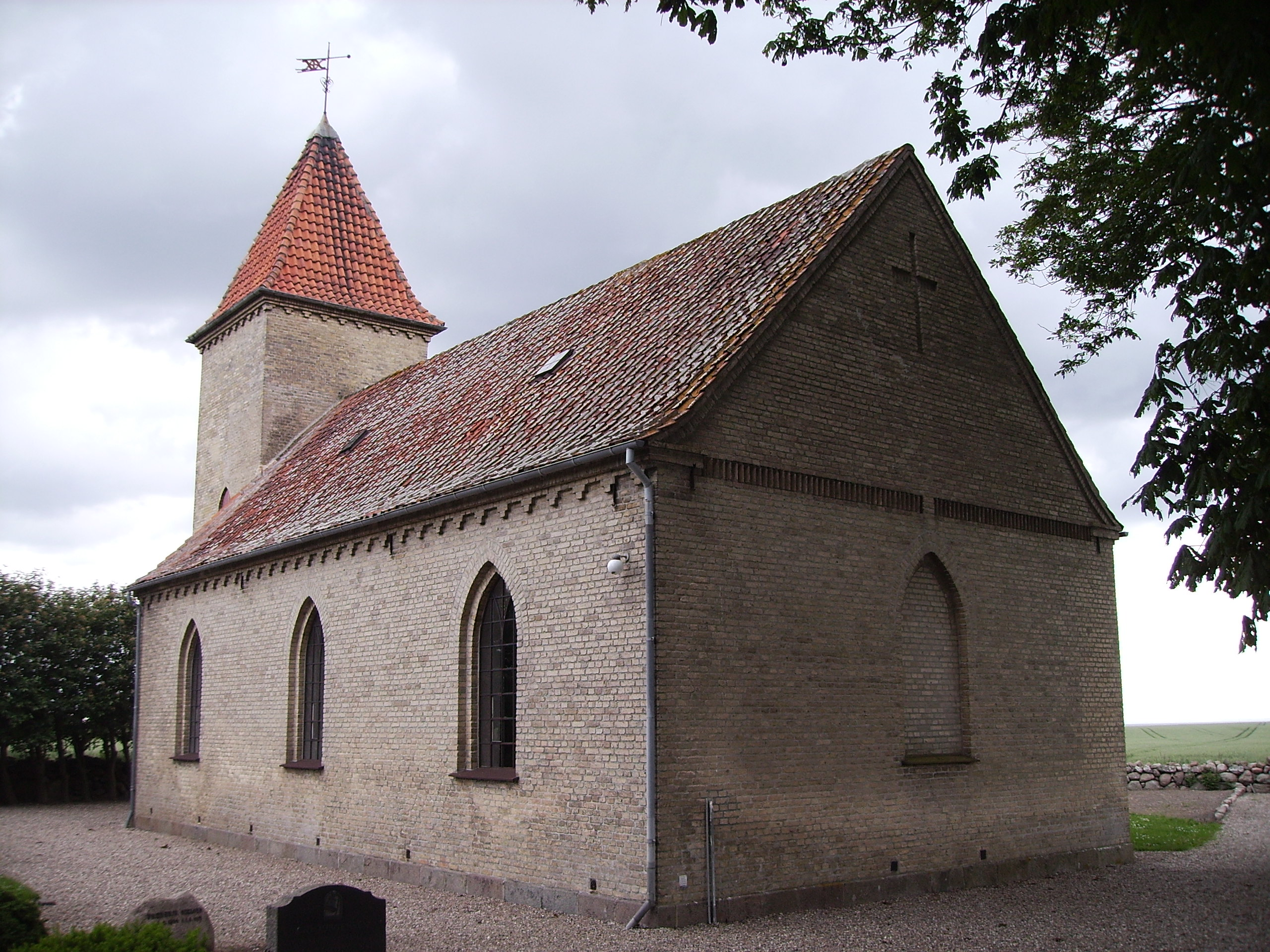
Bågø Church

== History ==
The island appears to have been inhabited since the Stone Age as flint tools have been found in the fields and there is evidence of a number old burial mounds. Side-by-side with farming, the island also had an active fishing community but this died out in the middle of the 20th century.

The large, well-kept farms in the centre of the island suffered a major disaster in 1880 when three of them were destroyed by lightning. Bågø Church in the northern part of the island was built in 1861 by the Count of Wedellsborg from the nearby Wedellsborg Estate on Funen. The lighthouse on the island's southern tip was built in 1816 and is now a listed building. In 1872, flooding from a storm caused the island to be divided into three smaller sections.

== Bågø today ==
The island has a small church and there is a kiosk at the harbour which is open in the summer. The village at the centre of the island is about 2 km from the harbour. There is no public transport. The harbour itself is a popular venue for pleasure craft, mainly from Denmark and Germany. There is a sandy beach on the south coast. The island is unspoilt and has a rich bird life.

In 2012, the Russian Orthodox nun Amvrosija (Russian: Амвросия), moved to the island. after living at Hesbjerg with Jørgen Laursen Vig, since 2001 and countinued after his death in 2005 until 2012. In the same year she established a Russian Orthodox monastery, called De Hellige Russiske Kongelige Martyrers Kloster at a farm on Prinsehøjsvej. In a house near the monastery, Amvrosija has set up a small retreat with rooms for pilgrims and guests, who come primarily from Russia and other former Soviet states

== In Fiction ==
The island featured in the 1943 film We Dive at Dawn (starring John Mills as Lieutenant Freddie Taylor) under the name of Hågo. It was on this island that, in the film, the British submarine HMS Sea Tiger is refuelled from a tanker that is in the harbour while Able Seaman Hobson (played by Eric Portman) and some of the crew keep the German garrison at bay. The film depicts no resistance put up by the Danish Merchant crew when "fuel and stores" are requested by Sea Tiger's captain, as the Danish captain of the tanker saying, "There will be no argument, the British Navy is always welcome in Denmark."

== See also ==
- List of islands of Denmark
