= Lille Egholm =

Island in Ærø Municipality, Denmark

- Location within Region of Southern Denmark

Geography
- Coordinates: 54°54′N 10°30′E
- Archipelago: South Funen Archipelago
- Area: 0.04 km^{2} (0.015 sq mi)

Administration
- Denmark
- Region: Region of Southern Denmark
- Municipality: Ærø

Lille Egholm is a small privately owned Danish island in the South Funen Archipelago, lying 150 meters southeast of Store Egholm. A part of Ærø Municipality, Lille Egholm covers an area of 0.04 km^{2}.

Due to its rich birdlife, the South Funen Archipelago has been designated as international bird sanctuary under the terms of both The Birds Directive of the European Union as well as the Ramsar Convention.
