= Mejlø =

- Location within Region of Southern Denmark

Geography
- Coordinates: 55°35′24″N 10°36′50″E
- Archipelago: South Funen Archipelago
- Area: 0.4 km^{2} (0.15 sq mi)

Administration
- Denmark
- Region: Region of Southern Denmark
- Municipality: Kerteminde Municipality

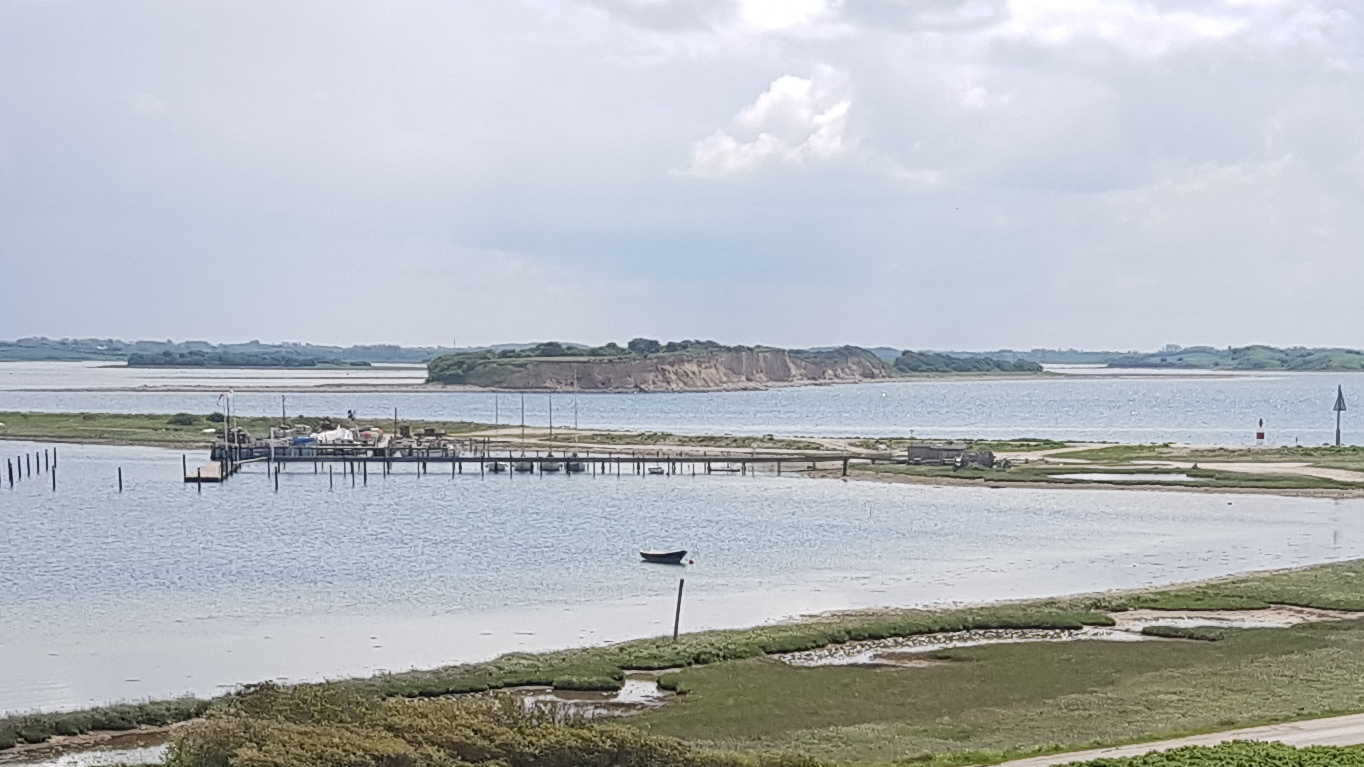
A picture of the island from the nearby shore

Mejlø is a small uninhabited Danish island located in the Kattegat. Mejlø covers an area of 0.4 km^{2}, and the highest point on the island is c. 9 m.
