= Strynø Kalv =

Island in Denmark

Strynø kalv
- Location within Region of Southern Denmark

Geography
- Coordinates: 54°53′55″N 10°34′40″E
- Archipelago: South Funen Archipelago
- Area: 0.458 km^{2} (0.177 sq mi)

Administration
- Denmark
- Region: Region of Southern Denmark
- Municipality: Langeland Municipality

Strynø Kalv is a small privately owned Danish island in the South Funen Archipelago, lying west of Strynø. Strynø Kalv covers an area of 0.458 km^{2}. A large part of the island remains in its natural state with farm animals grazing. Strynø kalv has since 1970 been uninhabited, but in 1921 its population was 27.

A part of the island is preserved for the conservation of the European fire-bellied toad.
