= Enø =

Danish island

Coordinates: 55°9′39″N 11°40′44″E

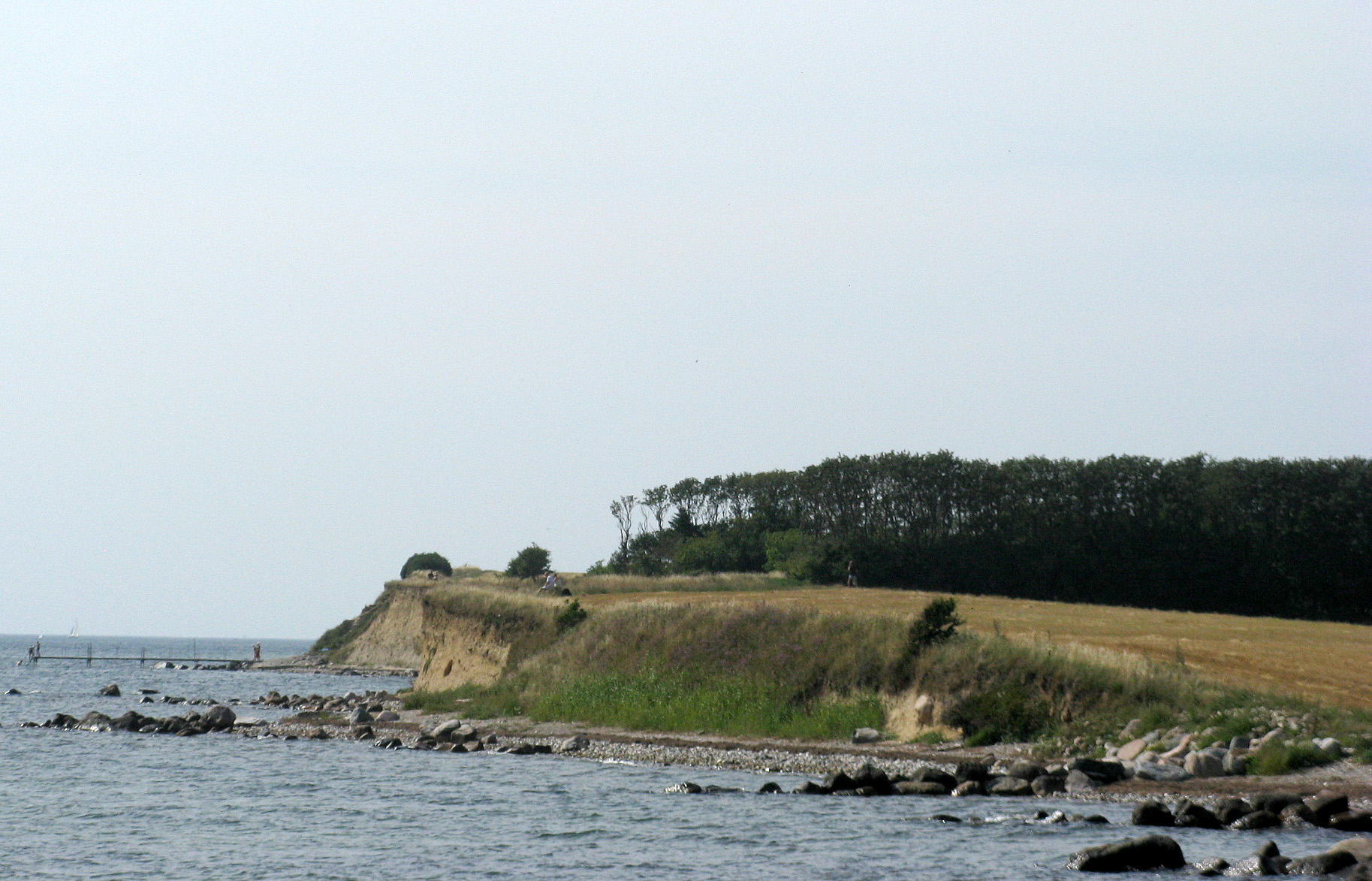
- The south-western coast of the island

Geography
- Location: Smålandsfarvandet
- Area: 3.4 km^{2} (1.3 sq mi)

Administration
- Denmark
- Region: Region Zealand
- Municipality: Næstved Municipality

Demographics
- Population: 297 (2010)
- Pop. density: 87.4/km^{2} (226.4/sq mi)

Enø is a small Danish island off the south coast of Zealand between Karrebæk Fjord and Karrebæksminde Bugt. With an area of 3.4 square kilometres (1.3 square miles), as of 1 January 2010 it has a population of 297. It is some 5 kilometres (3 miles) long and up to 11 metres (36 feet) above sea level. Now part of Næstved Municipality, it is connected to Karrebæksminde, Zealand, by a road bridge. There are about 1,000 summerhouses and a holiday centre at Enø By on the northern part of the island. EnøOverdrev in the southern part is a nature reserve and bird sanctuary.

== See also ==
- List of islands of Denmark
