= Glænø =

Island in Denmark

Coordinates: 55°11′45″N 11°26′0″E

Geography
- Location: Sydhavsøerne
- Area: 5.6 km^{2} (2.2 sq mi)
- Highest point: 4

Administration
- Denmark
- Region: Region Zealand
- Municipality: Slagelse Municipality

Demographics
- Population: 57 (2010)

Glænø is a small Danish island off the west coast of Zealand between Basnæs Nor and Karrebæksminde Bugt. With an area of 5.6 square kilometres (2.2 square miles), as of 1 January 2010 it has a population of 57. Now part of Slagelse Municipality, it is connected to Stubberup, Zealand, by road over a dam some 100 metres (330 feet) long. Agriculture is the island's main source of income and there are several farms at the centre of the island. Glænø has a sandy beach, a bird sanctuary and offers opportunities for walking and angling.

== See also ==
- List of islands of Denmark
