= Kalvøya =

Kalvøy or Kalvøya may refer to:

== Places ==
- Kalvøya, Bærum, an island in Bærum municipality in Akershus county, Norway
- Kalvøya, Lillesand, an island in Lillesand municipality in Agder county, Norway
- Kalvøya, Nærøysund, an island in Nærøysund municipality in Trøndelag county, Norway
- Kalvøy, Stavanger, an island in Stavanger municipality in Rogaland county, Norway
- Kalvøya, Steinkjer, a peninsula in Steinkjer municipality in Trøndelag county, Norway
- Kalvøya, Svalbard, an island in Svalbard, Norway

== See also ==
- Kalvø, a small, uninhabited island in southeastern Denmark
