= Store Svelmø =

Island in Denmark

- Location within Region of Southern Denmark

Geography
- Coordinates: 55°2′20.77″N 10°19′39.48″E
- Archipelago: South Funen Archipelago
- Area: 0.27 km^{2} (0.10 sq mi)

Administration
- Denmark
- Region: Region of Southern Denmark
- Municipality: Faaborg-Midtfyn Municipality

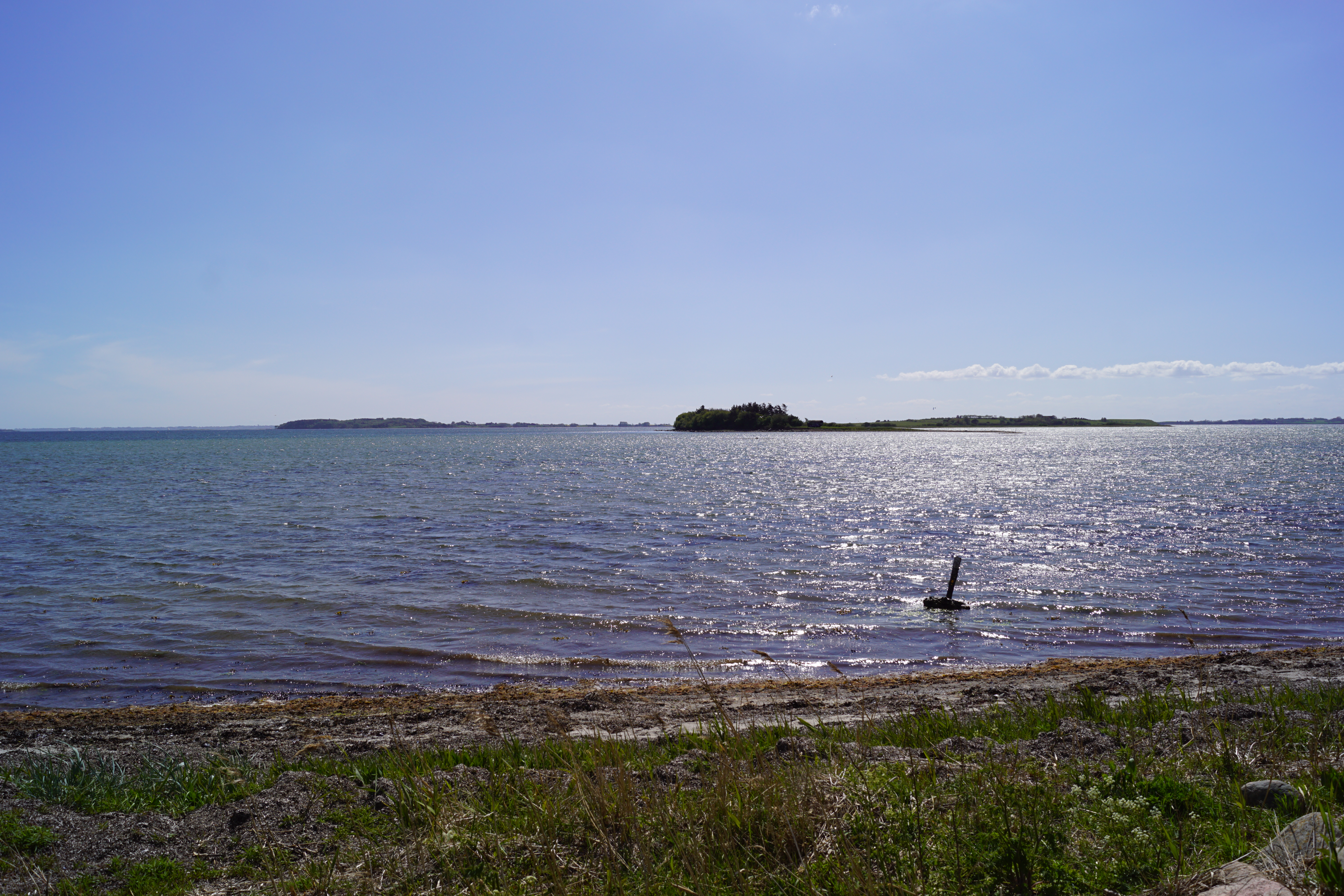
Græsholm og Svelmø

Store Svelmø is a small uninhabited Danish island in the South Funen Archipelago, lying southwest of Funen. Store Svelmø covers an area of 0.27 km^{2}.
