= Store Egholm =

Island in Denmark

- Location within Region of Southern Denmark

Geography
- Coordinates: 54°55′10″N 10°29′0″E
- Archipelago: South Funen Archipelago
- Area: 0.7 km^{2} (0.27 sq mi)

Administration
- Denmark
- Region: Region of Southern Denmark
- Municipality: Ærø Municipality

Store Egholm is a small Danish island in the South Funen Archipelago, lying 5 kilometers north west of Ærøskøbing, and close to Lille Egholm. Store Egholm covers an area of 0.7 km^{2}, and is currently uninhabited
