= Dybsø =

Island in Naestved Municipality, Denmark

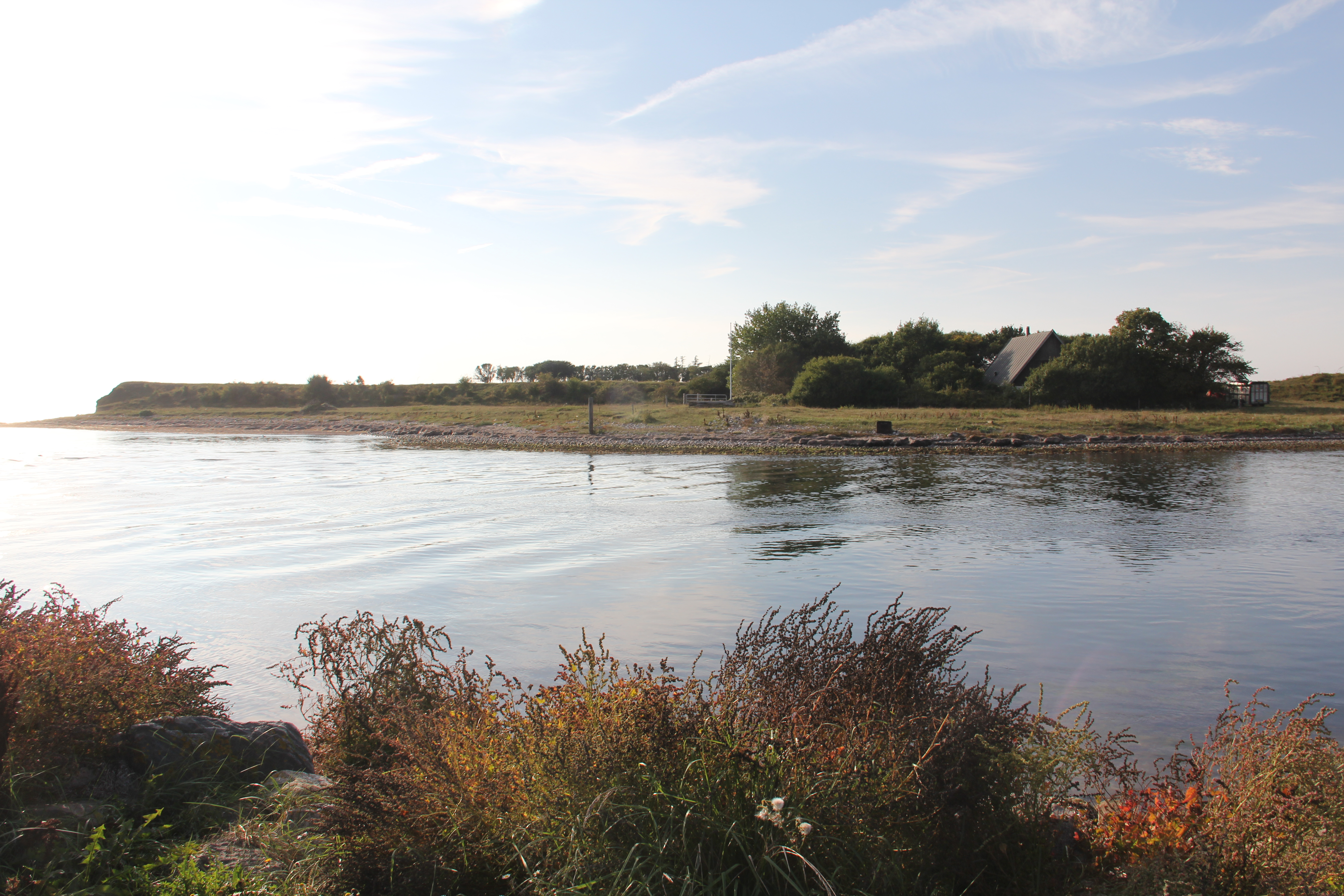
- Western end of Dybsø

- Location within Denmark Region Zealand

Geography
- Coordinates: 55°8′2.56″N 11°43′10″E
- Archipelago: Smålandsfarvandet
- Area: 1.34 km^{2} (0.52 sq mi)

Administration
- Denmark
- Region: Region Zealand
- Municipality: Næstved Municipality

Dybsø is an uninhabited Danish island, with an area of 1.34 km^{2}, located off the southwest coast of Zealand of in the Baltic Sea. The island, which since 1976 is owned by the state is part of the Dybsø Fjord wildlife reserve.
