= Langeland =

Danish island

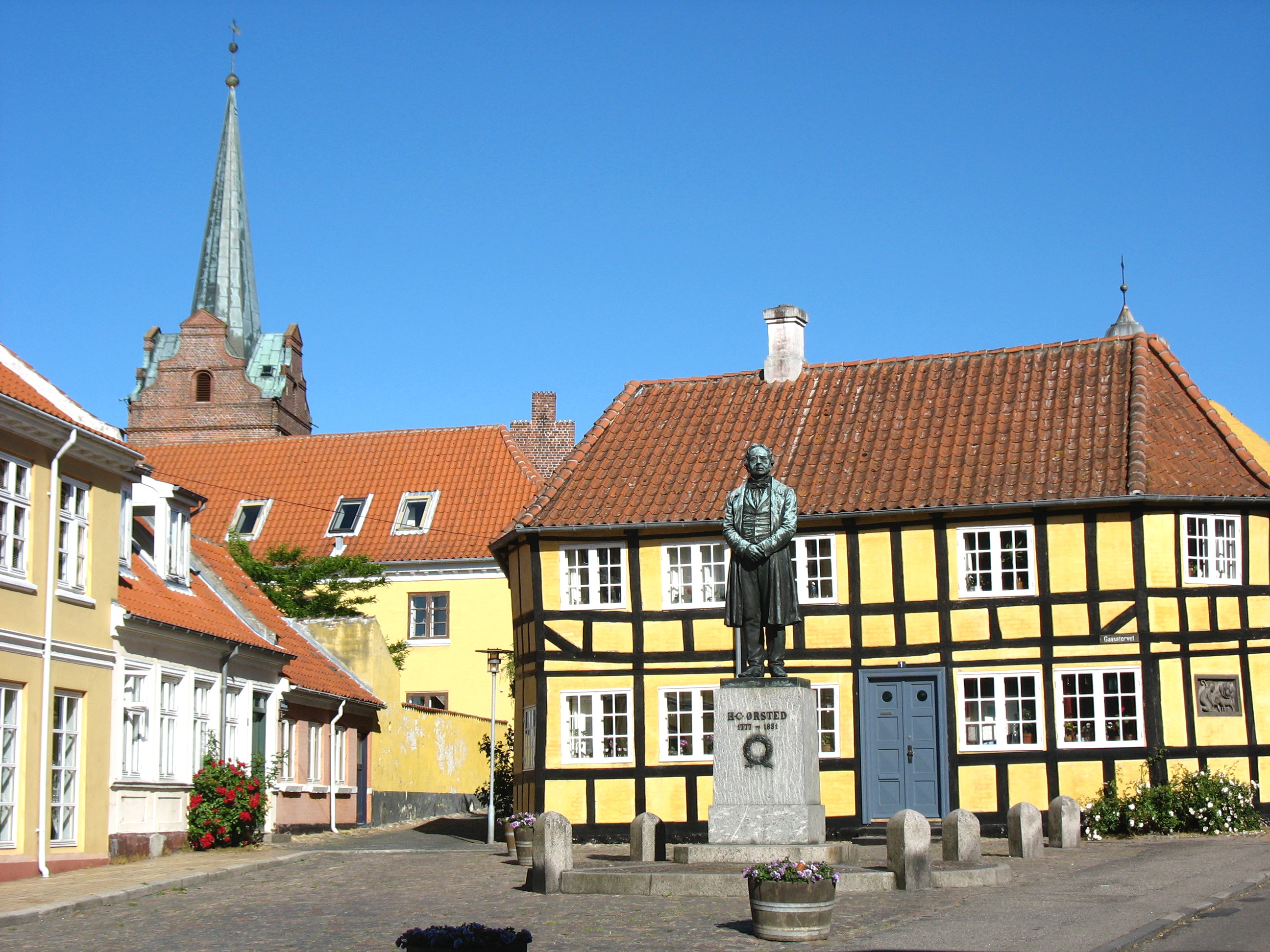
- Rudkøbing, Langeland

Geography
- Location: Great Belt
- Coordinates: 54°55′N 10°45′E
- Area: 284 km^{2} (110 sq mi)

Administration
- Denmark
- Region: South Denmark Region
- Municipality: Langeland Municipality
- Largest settlement: Rudkøbing (pop. 4.658)

Demographics
- Population: 12,446 (2018)
- Pop. density: 43.8/km^{2} (113.4/sq mi)

Langeland (Danish: [ˈlɑŋəˌlænˀ], lit. 'Long land') is a Danish island located between the Great Belt and Bay of Kiel. The island measures 285 km^{2} (c. 110 square miles) and, as of 1 January 2018, has a population of 12,446. The island produces grain and is known as a recreational and wellness tourism area. A bridge connects it to Tåsinge via Siø – a small island with a population of approximately 20 – and the main island of Funen (to the northwest). There are connections by car ferry to the islands of Lolland, Ærø, and Strynø.

Rudkøbing, the island's largest town, is the birthplace of famous physicist and chemist Hans Christian Ørsted, his brother, Anders Sandøe Ørsted, a former Danish prime minister, and their nephew, botanist Anders Sandøe Ørsted.

Administratively, Langeland and several smaller islands around it form the Municipality of Langeland, the most populous of them being Strynø.

== Role in the Larne gun-running ==
On 30 March 1914, the vessel SS Fanny docked at Langeland and proceeded to be loaded with a "mysterious" cargo. This cargo turned out to be a weapons cache including 11,000 Männlicher rifles brought from the Steyr works in Austria; 9,000 ex-German army Mausers; 4,600 Italian Vetterli-Vitali rifles; and 5 million rounds of ammunition in clips of five. The cache had been purchased by Major Frederick Hugh Crawford for the Ulster Unionist Council to equip the Ulster Volunteer Force in Ireland.

Danish customs officials suspected that the cargo might have contained weapons to arm militant Icelandic home rulers who sought independence from Denmark. However the SS Fanny cut loose, escaped in a gale and sailed out of Danish territorial waters.

The weapons cache would later land in Larne on the north-east coast of Ireland in what became known as the Larne gun-running.

== Gallery ==
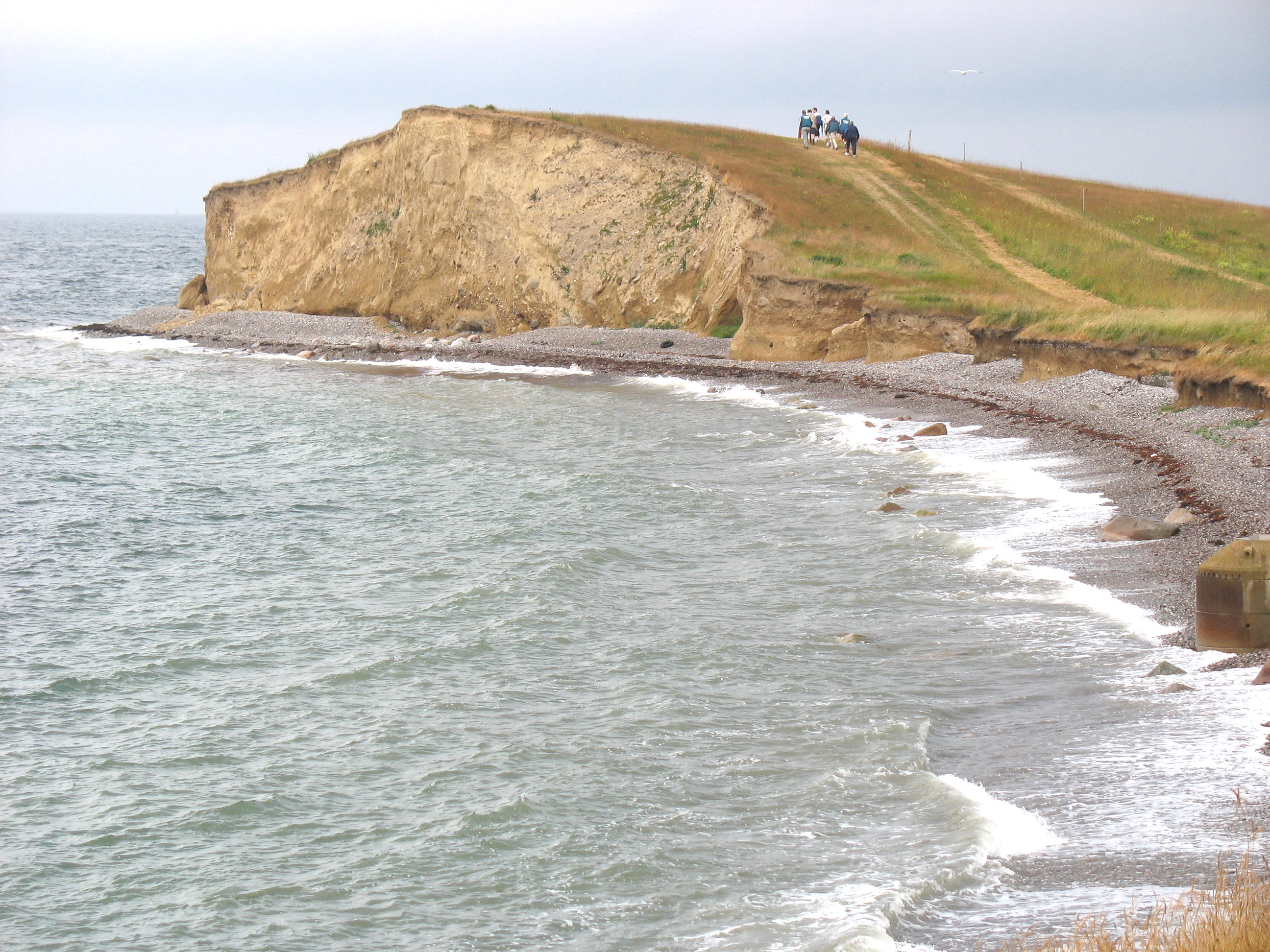
Dovns Klint

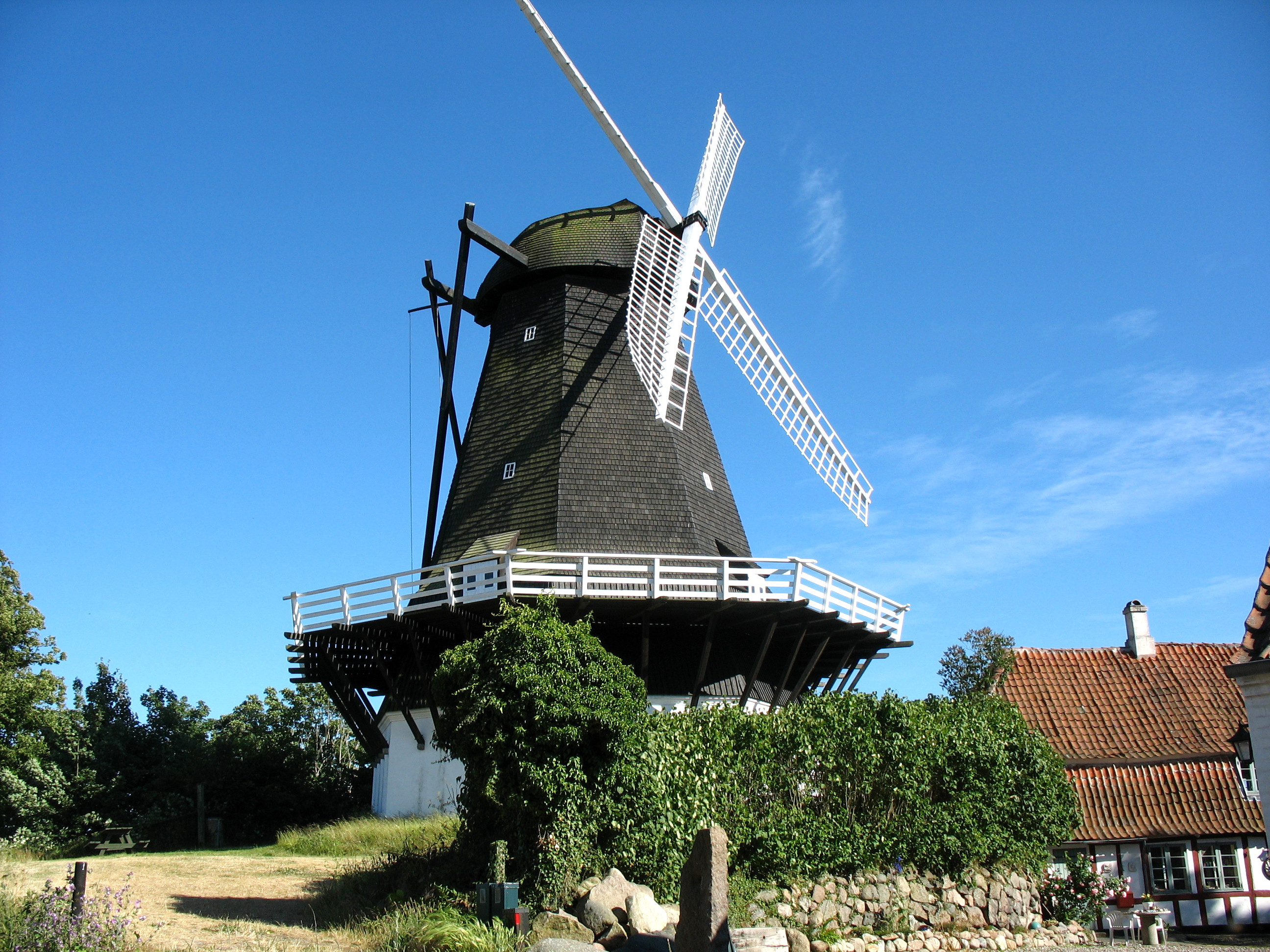
Rudkøbing windmill

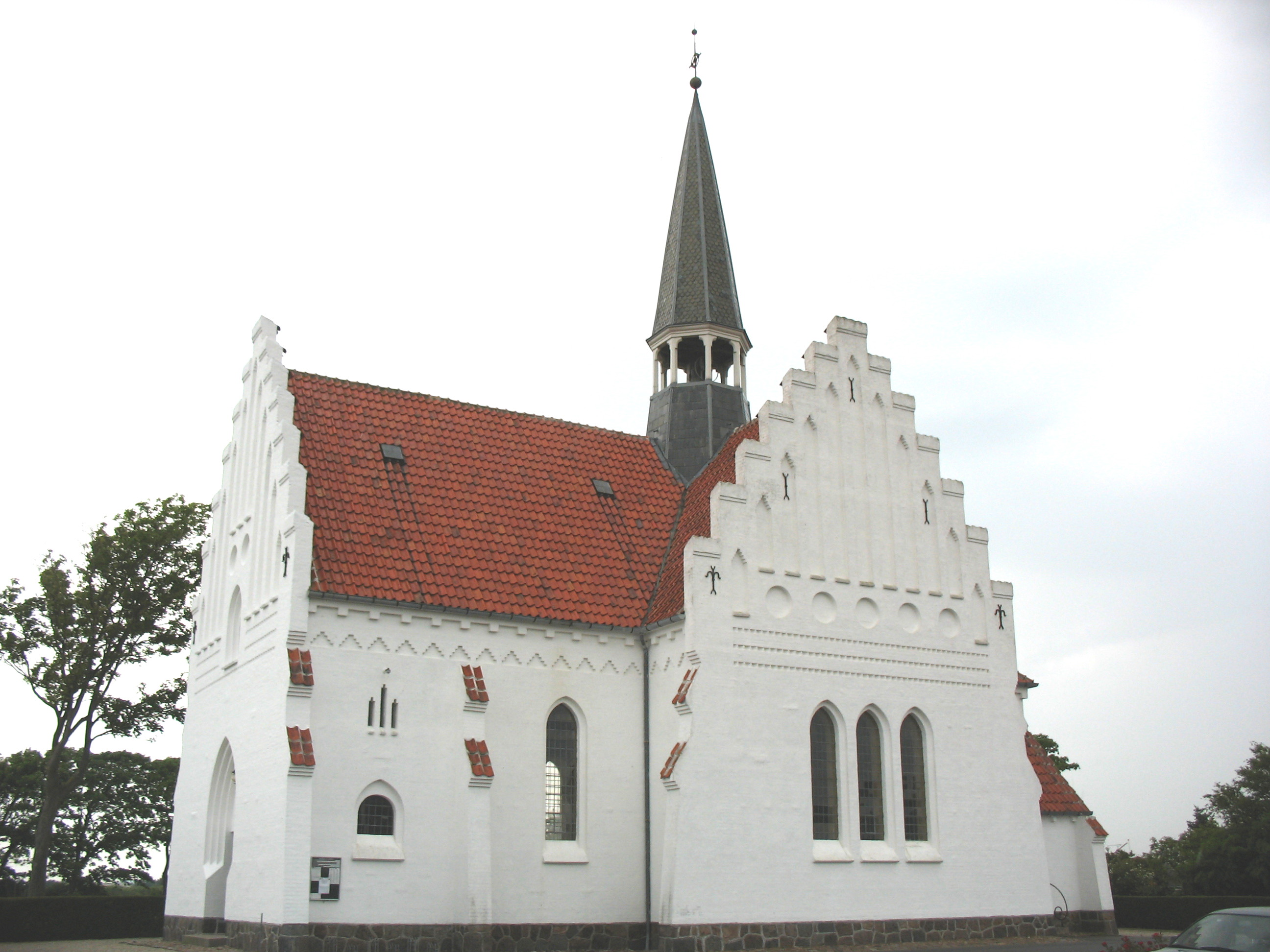
Bagenkop Church

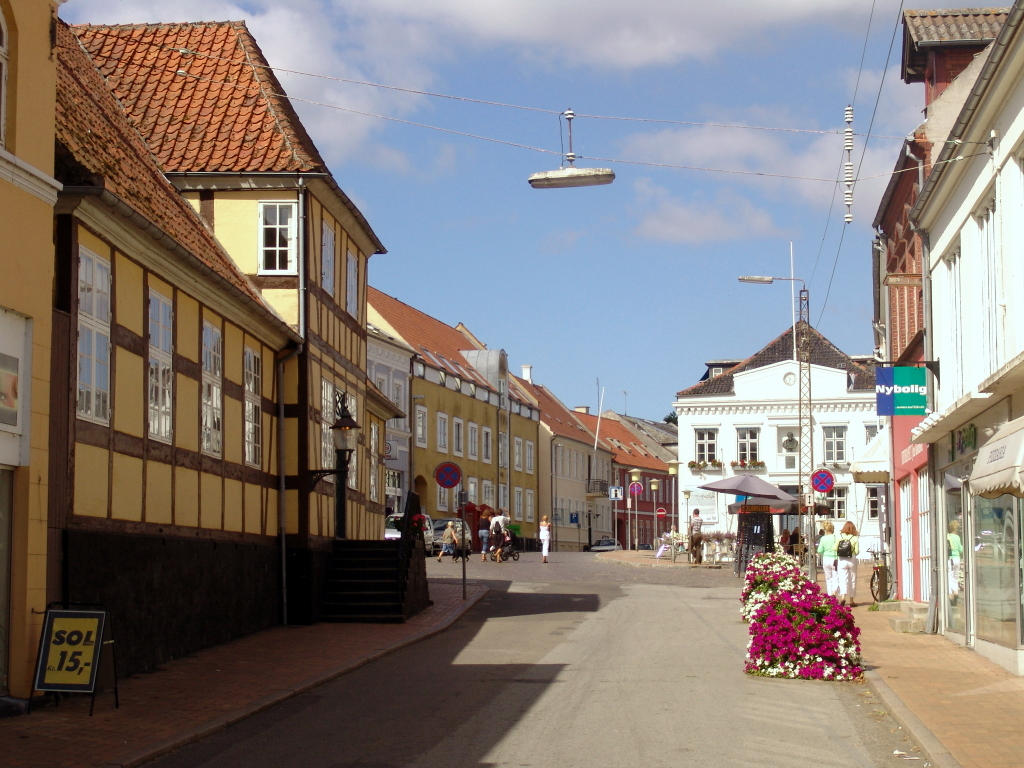
Rudkøbing market place

== See also ==
- List of Danish islands
- Langeland Municipality
