= Agerø =

Small Danish island in Limfjorden

Coordinates: 56°43′N 8°34′E

Agerø's location in the Limfjord

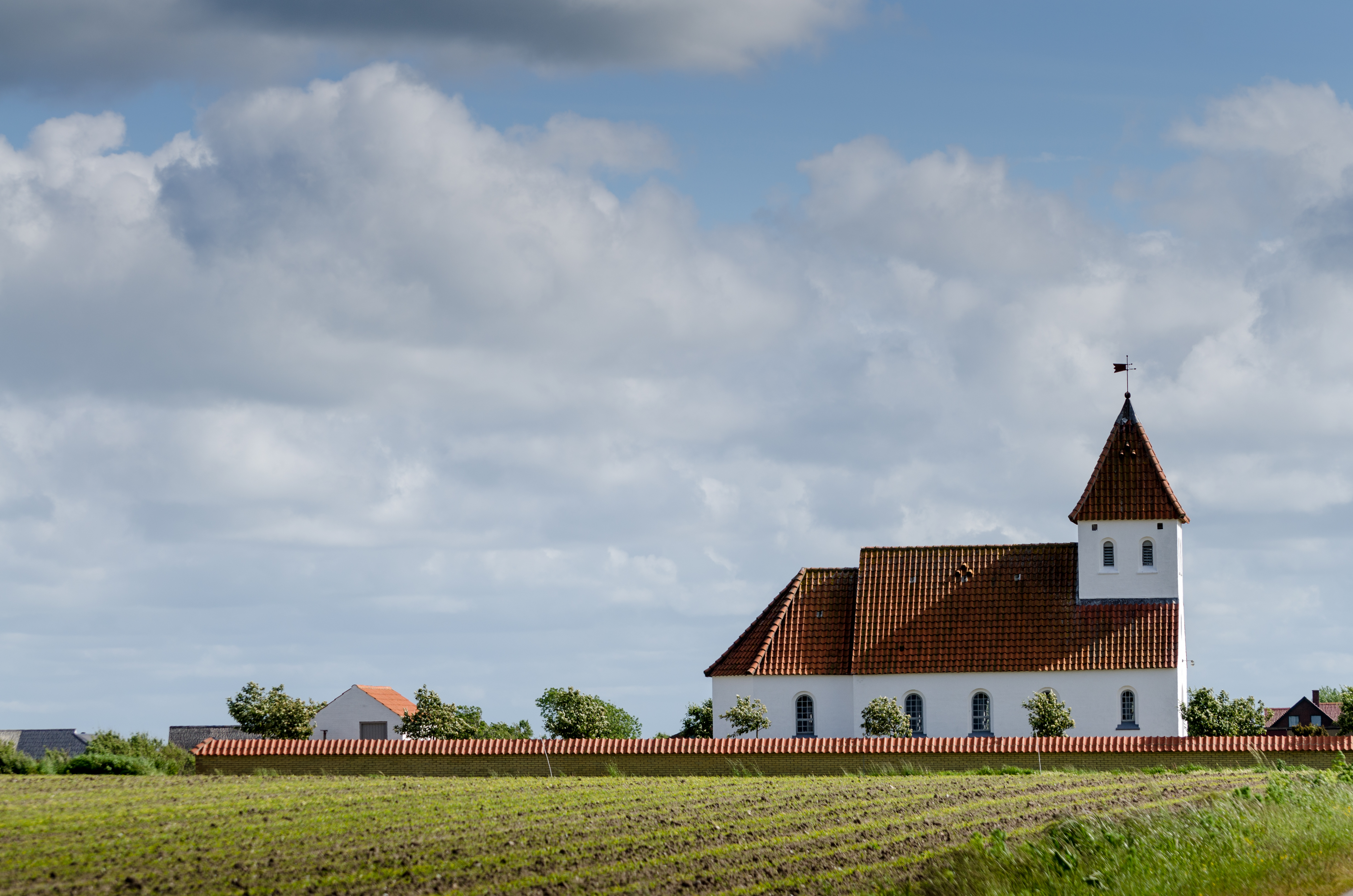
Agerø Church

Agerø is a small Danish island in Limfjorden located in the waters between the larger island of Mors, to which it is connected by a dam and a bridge, and the Thyholm Peninsula. With an area of 3.8 km^{2}, it has a population of 38 as of 1 January 2010. Most of the island is cultivated but in the north there is a 25 hectare nature reserve of coastal meadows which are an important rest stop for migratory birds.

Agerø Church, one of the smallest churches in Denmark with only 60 seats, was consecrated in 1908. It was constructed when a coffin on the way to the cemetery at Hvidbjerg on Mors was dropped into the water and drifted ashore.

== See also ==
- List of islands of Denmark
