= Hirsholmene =

Group of Danish islands

Coordinates: 57°29′08″N 10°37′28″E

Designations

Ramsar Wetland
- Designated: 2 September 1977
- Reference no.: 147

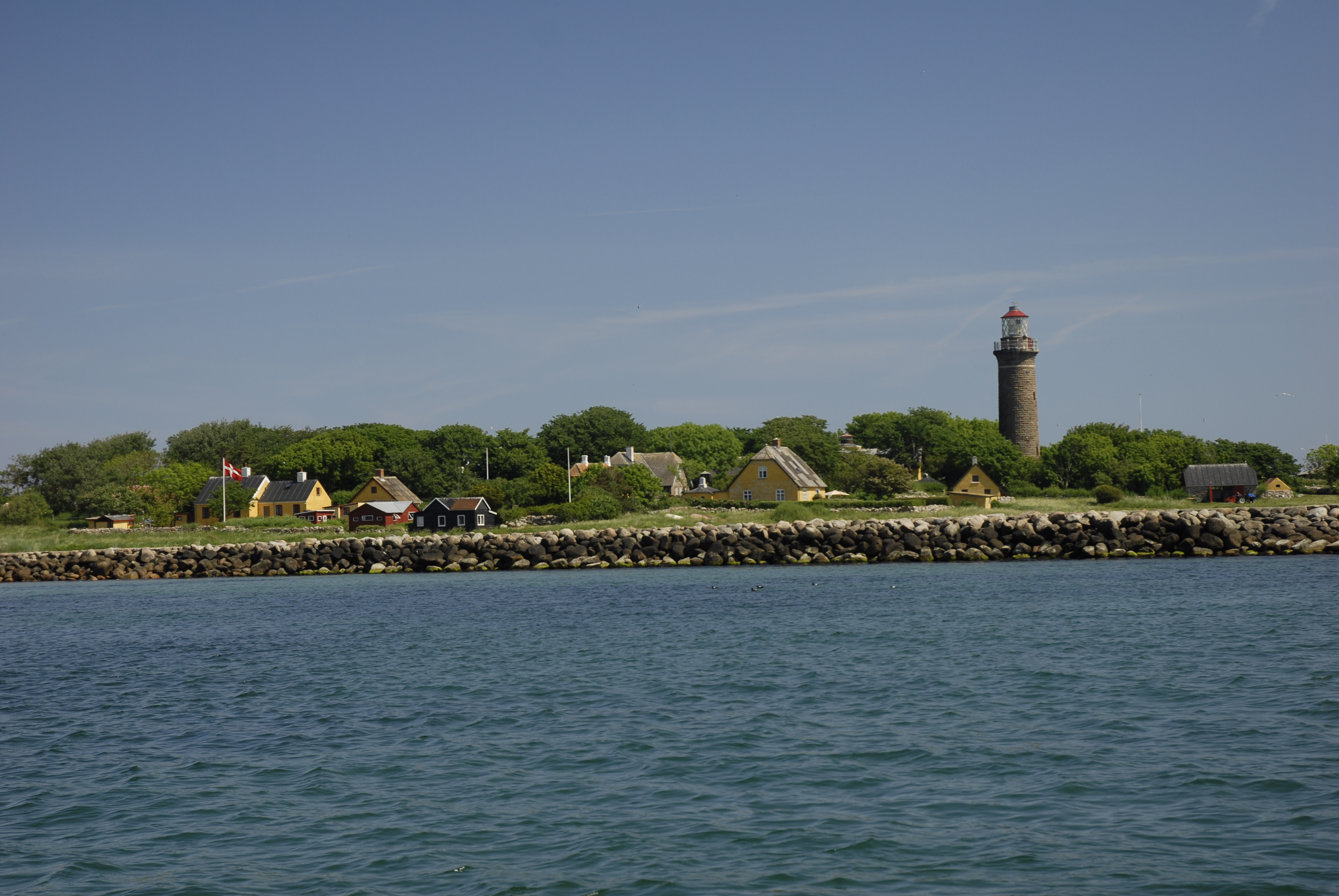

Hirsholmene is a group of ten small Danish islands in the Kattegat; Hirsholm, Græsholm, Lilleholm, Tyvholm, Kølpen and Deget, located approximately 7 km to the northeast of Frederikshavn. Noted for their impressive bird populations, the islands have been a Danish nature reserve since 1938.

Only Hirsholm is inhabited, with a small settlement dating from the 16th century, and a lighthouse from 1886.

The island was the summer retreat for the noted Danish author Dines Skafte Jespersen who wrote the children's book series called Troldepus in addition to other works. He also wrote three autobiographical works, including one about his year living and working on the island, called Himmel, hav og en ø (Sky, Sea and an Island).

== Protections ==
Hirsholmene has been an international Ramsar area since 2 September 1977. Today it has number 147 and encompass 3,714 ha.
