= Lindholm (Stege Bugt) =

Danish island

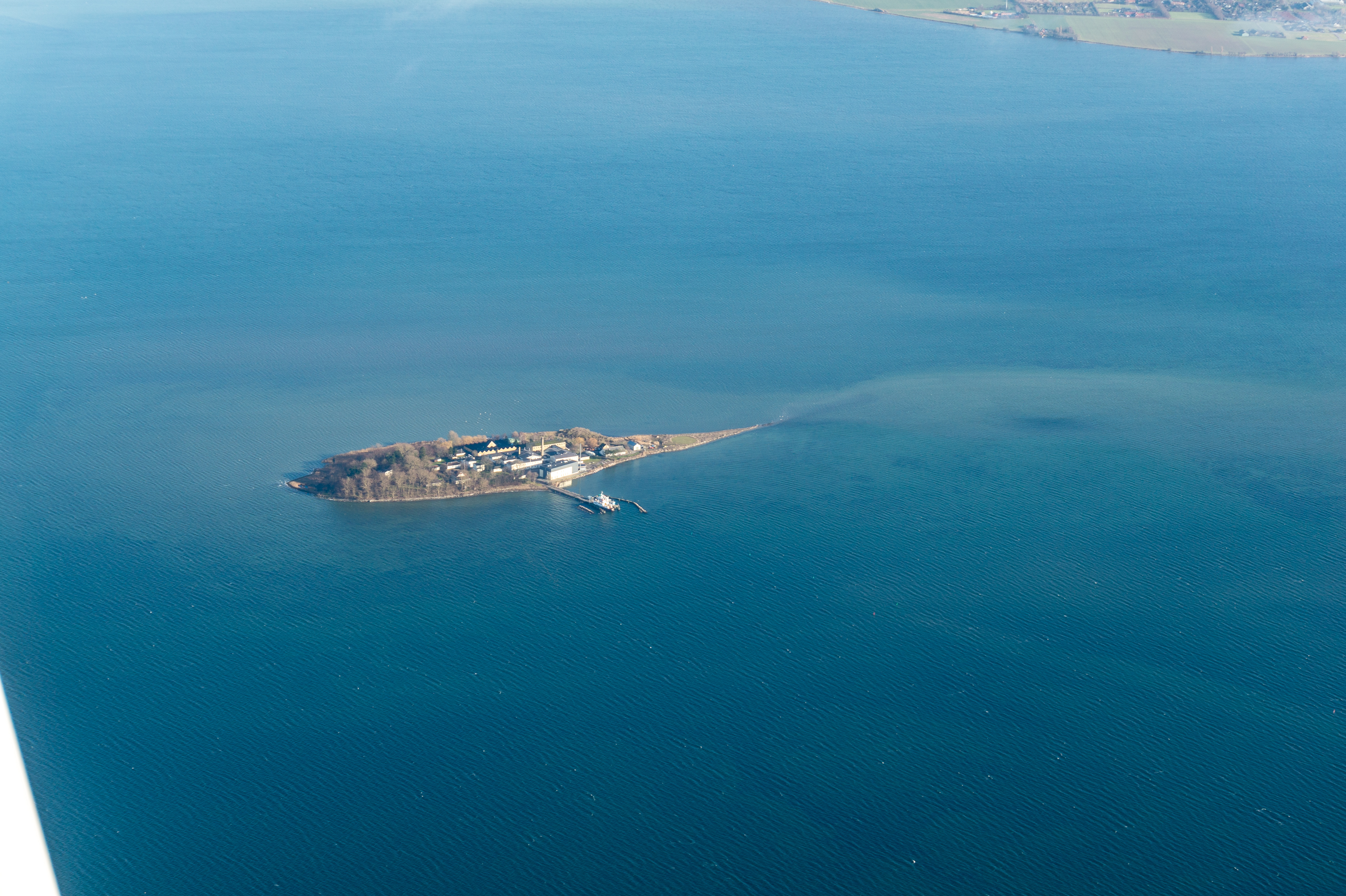

- Location within Denmark Region Zealand

Geography
- Coordinates: 55°0′25″N 12°13′20″E
- Area: 0.07 km^{2} (0.027 sq mi)

Administration
- Denmark
- Region: Region Zealand
- Municipality: Vordingborg Municipality

Lindholm is a small Danish uninhabited island located in Stege Bugt. Lindholm covers an area of 0.07 square kilometres (0.027 sq mi).

Until 2018 the island housed a field station belonging to the veterinary institute of the Technical University of Denmark. Starting in 1938 a vaccine against foot-and-mouth disease was produced on the island.

The Danish government considered but eventually shelved a plan to house, on the island, unsuccessful applicants for asylum with criminal records who could not otherwise be deported.
