= Strynø =

Island in Denmark

- Location within Region of Southern Denmark

Geography
- Coordinates: 54°54′20″N 10°36′30″E
- Archipelago: South Funen Archipelago
- Area: 4.88 km^{2} (1.88 sq mi)

Administration
- Denmark
- Region: Region of Southern Denmark
- Municipality: Langeland Municipality

Demographics
- Population: 216 (2025)

Strynø is a small Danish island lying west of Langeland, north-east of Ærø, and south of Tåsinge in the South Funen Archipelago. A constituent part of Langeland municipality, Strynø covers an area of 4.88 km^{2}. The population of the island on 1 January 2025 was 216. In 1906, the population peaked, with 787 people living on the island.

In 2022 Strynø won the prize "Island of the year" (Årets ø).

== Geography ==
Strynø was formed by gletchers during the Weichselian glaciation. The highest point on the island is 10 metres above sea level. There are many farms on the island, of which most practice organic farming. In 2024, there were 15 certified organic farms on Strynø. West of Strynø lies the uninhabited island of Strynø Kalv that together with Strynø and other minor islands form Strynø Parish.

== Buildings ==
Strynø hosts a small grocery store, an inn, a kindergarten, a school (from 0th to 4th grade), and Øhavets Smakkecenter, a small maritime museum and activity centre. Since 1998, the school has been a listed building. A ferry service of around eight 30-minute crossings per day connects Strynø with Rudkøbing on Langeland. Strynø Mill was built in 1832 on the west coast of Strynø and was in use as a gristmill until 1967. After a flood in 1904, the mill was moved away from the coast to prevent future damage. Strynø also has a church, which was built in 1867 and lies in the middle of the island. The church stands out by partly facing south; most Danish churches face either east or west.

== Notable people ==
- Hans Egede Saabye (1746 on Strynø – 1817) a Danish priest and a missionary to Greenland where he became an accomplished botanist.
