= Møgelø =

Island in Denmark

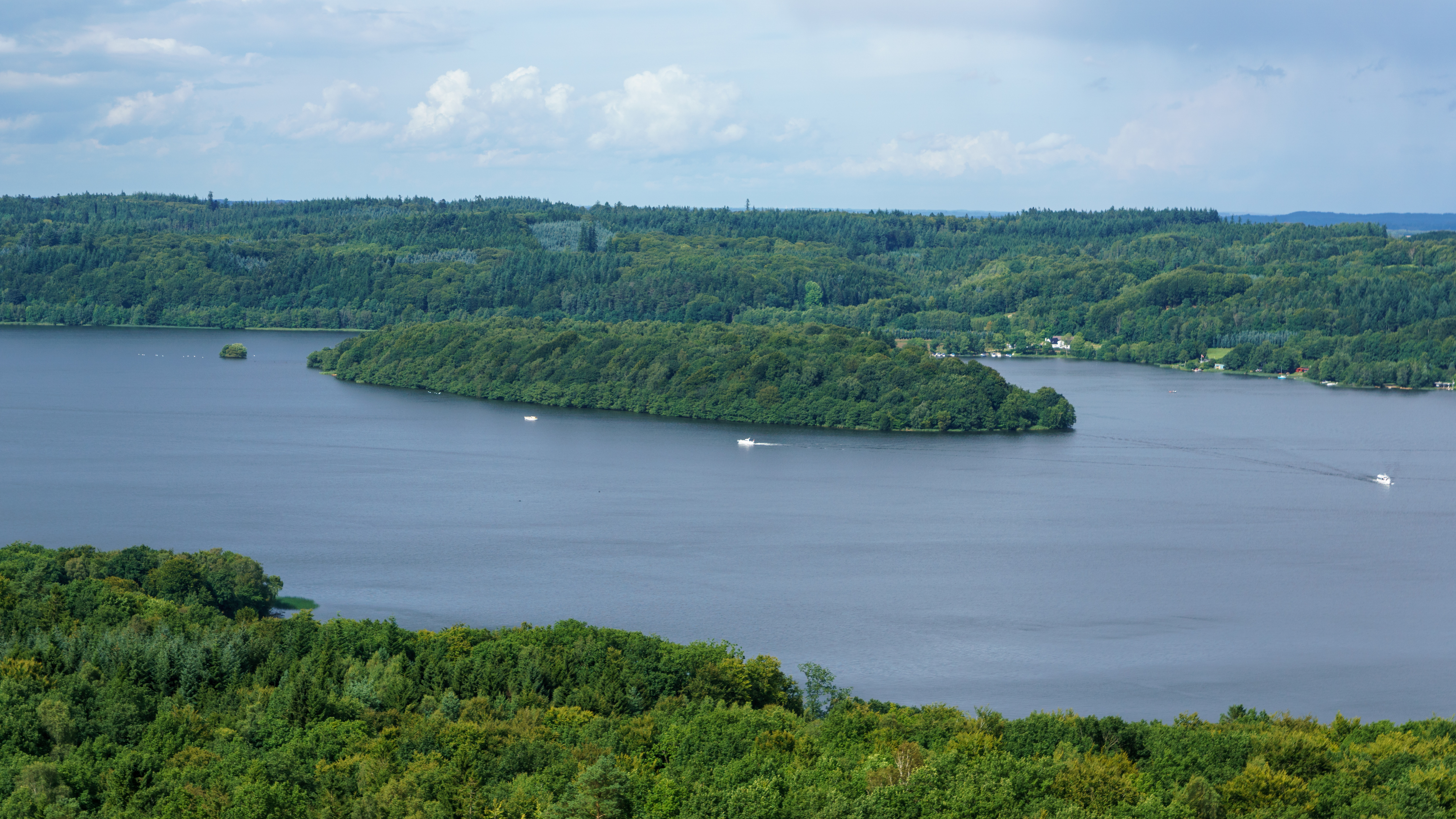
- View of Møgelø within Lake Julsø as seen from Himmelbjerget.

Geography
- Location: Julsø
- Coordinates: 56°7′20″N 9°40′50″E
- Area: 28 ha (69 acres)

Administration
- Denmark
- Region: Central Denmark Region
- Municipality: Silkeborg Municipality

Møgelø is an island in Julsø opposite of Himmelbjerget in Denmark. The name Møgelø means "Big Island", as it is the largest in the lake with 28 hectares of land. Between 1915 and 1942, the FDF in Silkeborg bought up a total of 24 acres of land on the island. There are now two FDF cabins belonging to the independent institution.
