= Smålandsfarvandet =

Body of water in Denmark

Coordinates: 55°N 11.6°E

Smålandsfarvandet (lit. "The small-land waterway") is a body of water in Denmark. It connects Storebælt in the west with Storstrømmen and Guldborgsund in the east and serves as a waterway for coastal traffic, yachts, and other small craft. It is bordered by Zealand in the north and Falster and Lolland in the south. The largest of the many islands in Smålandsfarvandet are Fejø, Femø, Askø, Lilleø, Skalø, Vejrø, and Rågø.

Since May 1998 it has been listed as a Natura 2000 site.
