= Kalvø, Genner Bugt =

Island in Denmark

Coordinates: 55.1194°N 9.4667°E

Kalvø is an island in Denmark that is located in Region Syddanmark, in the southern part of the country, 210 km west of Copenhagen.

== Climate ==
The climate in the area is temperate. The average annual temperature in the area is 7°C. The warmest month is July, when the average temperature is 15°C, and the coldest is March, with 3°C.
