= Illumø =

Island in Denmark

- Location within Region of Southern Denmark

Geography
- Coordinates: 55°8′N 10°6′E
- Area: 0.90 km^{2} (0.35 sq mi)

Administration
- Denmark
- Region: Region of Southern Denmark
- Municipality: Faaborg-Midtfyn Municipality

Illumø is a small uninhabited Danish island lying south west of Funen. Illumø covers an area of 0.90 km^{2}.

There is no ferry connection from the mainland to the island.
