= Lilleø =

Island in Denmark

Coordinates: 54.910364°N 11.484220°E

Geography
- Location: Smålandsfarvandet
- Area: 0.86 km^{2} (0.33 sq mi)
- Highest point: 4

Administration
- Denmark
- Region: Region Zealand
- Municipality: Lolland Municipality

Demographics
- Population: 15 (2005)

Lilleø is an island located off the coast of Lolland, Denmark. Since the 1930s, a number of farms growing fruit have been located on the island. It has a unique microclimate giving the fruit a taste which has been described as "intense".

The island's name literally means "little island" in Danish. It has an area of 0.86 km^{2}.

It is connected to the neighbouring island of Askø by a 700 m-long (2,300 ft) dam, which was constructed in 1914. The main ferry connections to other parts of Denmark are from Askø itself.

A flood hit the island in 1872, destroying houses, covering fields with sand, and ruining the source of fresh water on the island. In 2006, the island was hit by another storm which caused heavy damage.
