= Skalø =

Island in Denmark

- Location within Denmark Region Zealand

Geography
- Coordinates: 54°57′45″N 11°21′30″E
- Archipelago: Smålandsfarvandet
- Area: 1.06 km^{2} (0.41 sq mi)

Administration
- Denmark
- Region: Region Zealand
- Municipality: Lolland Municipality

Demographics
- Population: 11 (January 2009)

Skalø is a small Danish island, with an area of 1.06 km^{2} and a population of 11 located south west of Zealand in the Baltic Sea.
