= Brandsø =

Island in the Little Belt, Denmark

Coordinates: 55°21′N 9°43′E

Brandsø's location in the Little Belt

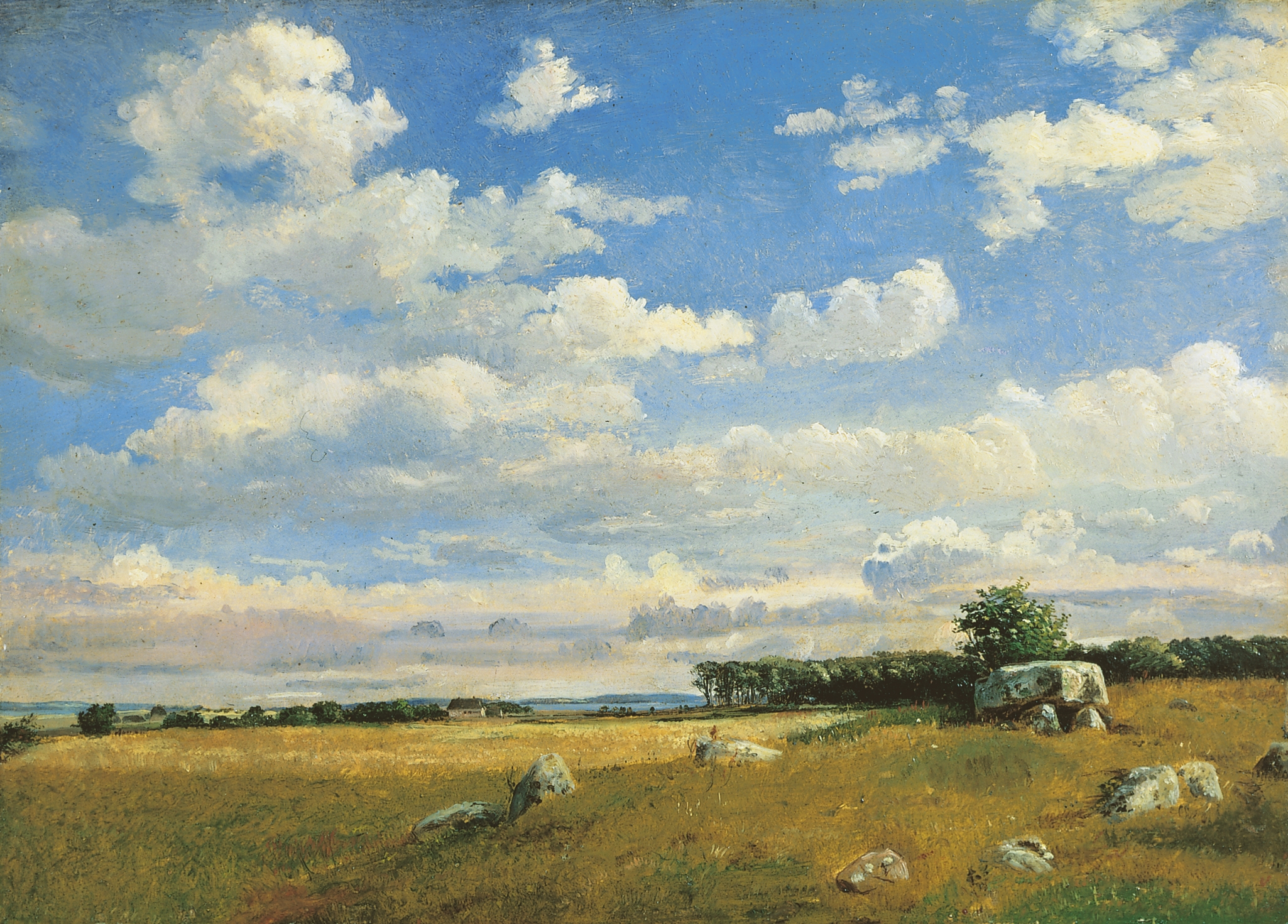
Painting of Brandsø by Dankvart Dreyer

Brandsø is a small, uninhabited Danish island located in Little Belt between Jutland and Funen, 15 km to the north-west of Assens. It has an area of 2.0 km^{2} it lies in Middelfart Municipality and belongs to the Wedellsborg estate. The hilly island is formed by glacial moraines and has a large bog at its centre and forested areas to the east. It is used for hunting.

In the 1920s, Brandsø had a population of around 50 but was gradually depopulated and has been uninhabited since the late 1960s. In 1974 it was listed as one of 15 possible locations for a Danish nuclear power plant.

== See also ==
- List of islands of Denmark
