= Fejø =

- Island
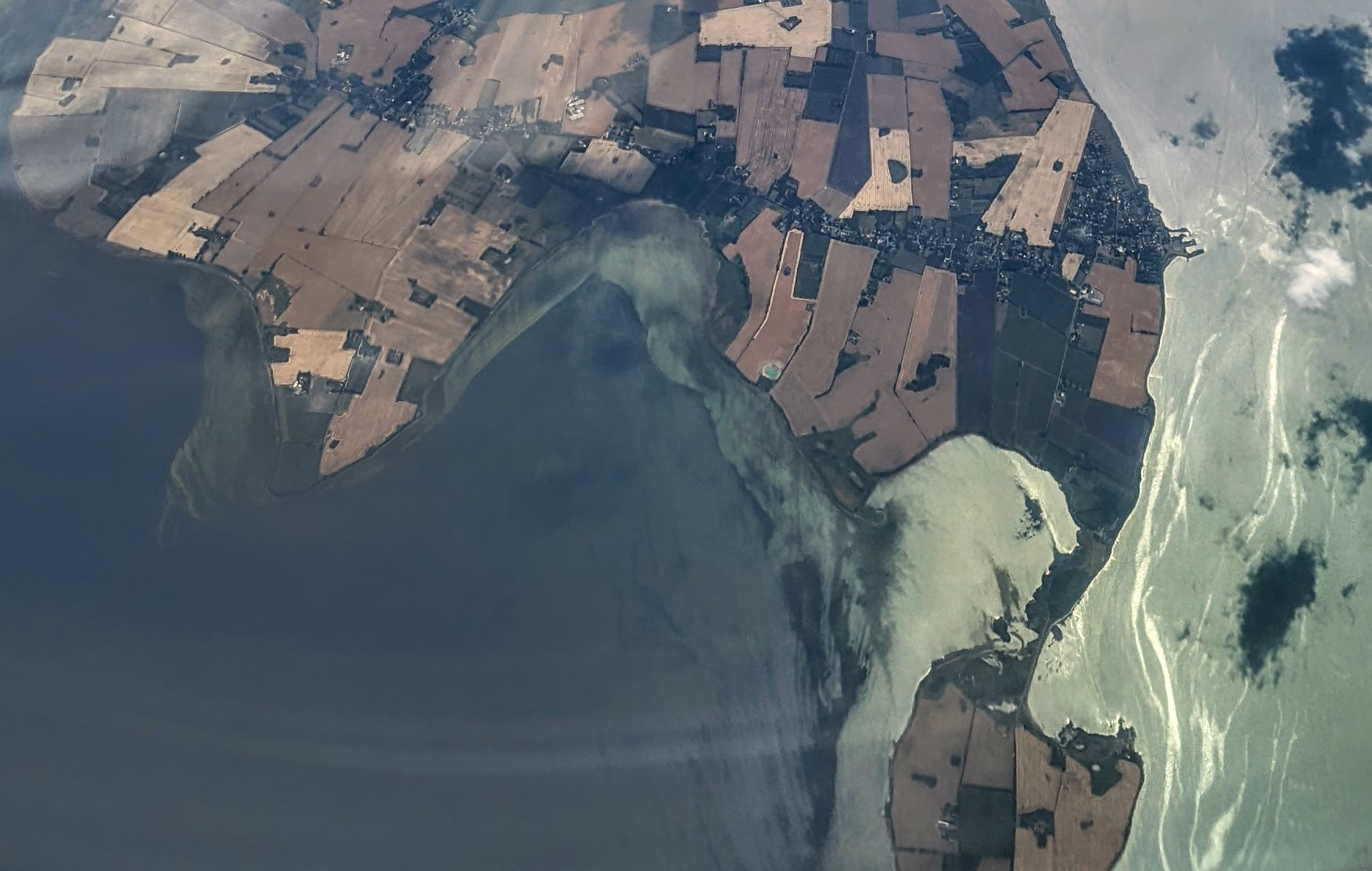
- Aerial of the west half of Fejø with village Vesterby

- Fejø is north of Lolland (bottom center)
- Coordinates: 54°57′0″N 11°26′0″E
- Country: Denmark
- Municipality: Lolland municipality

Area
  - Total: 16 km^{2} (6.2 sq mi)

Population (2005)
  - Total: 611
  - Density: 38/km^{2} (99/sq mi)
- Time zone: UTC+1 (CET)
  - Summer (DST): UTC+2 (CEST)
- Postal codes: 4944
- Website: http://www.fejoe.dk

Fejø is a Danish island north of Lolland. It covers an area of 16 km^{2} (6.2 sq mi) and has 611 permanent inhabitants (1 January 2005). Its population expands in Summer since many Danes have summerhouses and there is an influx of other tourists. Fejø has two villages: Vesterby and Østerby, connected by a single main road. Fejø has two main harbors, Vesterbyhavn and Dybvighavn. The island has a cafe, restaurant, shop, retirement home, church, primary school, mill, and a resident doctor. It has a windmill which was restored and started grinding corn for the first time in decades in June 2013.

== Climate ==
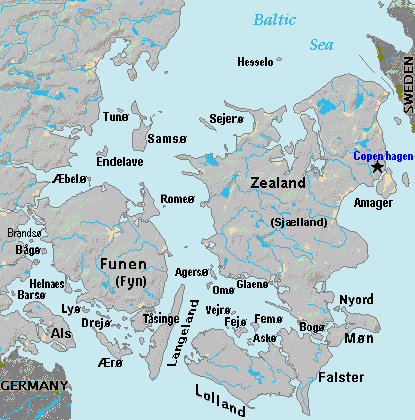
Fejø island (lower center) is north of Lolland, south of Zealand island, west of Femø & east of Langeland.

The island has a microclimate with few late frosts and one of the longest growing seasons in Denmark, making it very well suited for apples and pears. Winters are among the mildest in Denmark. It is known for its many apple plantations and has an annual festival Æblets Dag (Day Of The Apple) which features a picture composed from local apples. Local products include apple juice, marmelade, cider and honey. Fejø has an active permaculture group who are researching the productivity of exotic species and transition town initiative with a variety of projects.

== Transport ==
A subsidised ferry from Kragenæs carries vehicles and foot passengers to Vesterbyhavn in 15 minutes and runs about 20 times daily. It is free for island residents. A subsidised bus provides free transport on the island. The island has a bicycle sharing system which makes bikes available at both Vesterbyhavn and Dybvighavn, charging 50 kr. for a day's cycle hire.

== See also ==
- Nearby islands: Femø, Vejrø, Askø, Lolland.
