= Nakskov Fjord =

Inlet on the island of Lolland, Denmark

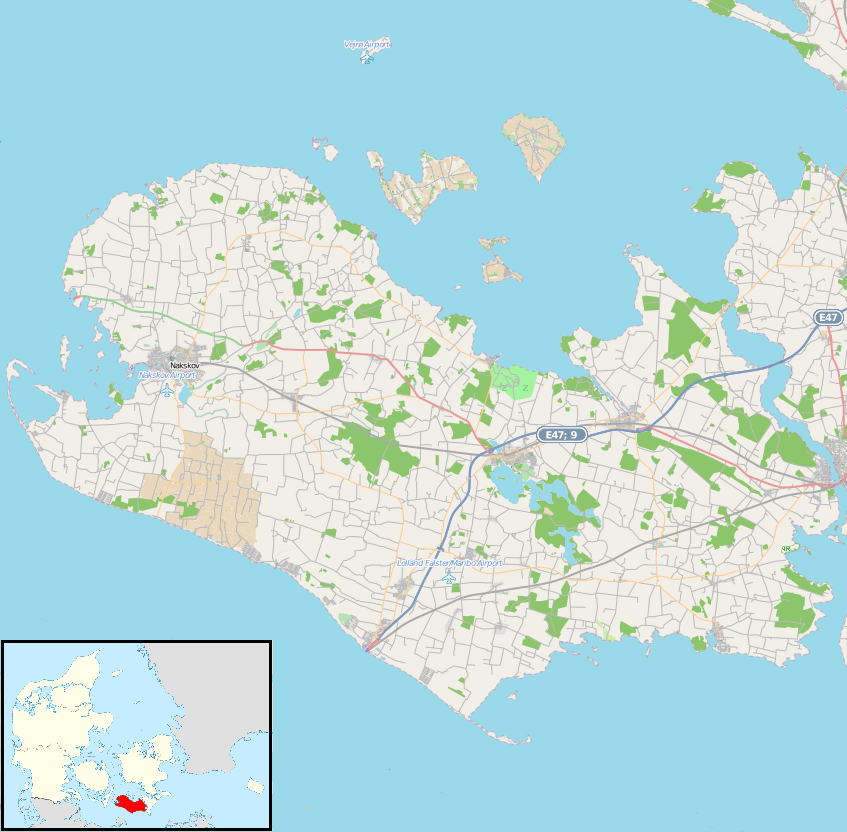
- Location within Lolland
- Location: Lolland, Denmark
- Coordinates: 54°50′N 11°4′E
- Basin countries: Denmark
- Max. length: 12 kilometres (7.5 mi)
- Max. depth: 8.5 metres (28 ft)

Ramsar Wetland
- Official name: Nakskov Fjord and Inner Fjord
- Designated: 9 February 1977
- Reference no.: 162

Nakskov Fjord is an inlet in the west of the island of Lolland, Denmark. It is about 12 km (7.5 mi) long. There are about 10 small islands located in the fjord. The largest town in the area is Nakskov. The area is a designated bird sanctuary.

== Geography ==
Naksov Fjord is situated at the western end of Lolland. Nakskov is the largest town in the area, along with the smaller towns of Langø and Tårs. The southern edge of the fjord is made by the 7.5 kilometer long curved strip of grassland called Albuen ("The Elbow") while the northern edge lies near the small town of Tårs. A ferry commutes between Tårs and Spodsbjerg. Along the fjord, just outside Nakskov, is situated the beautiful beach, Hestehovedet. The fjord is about 12 kilometers long. The depth is usually shallow, around 1–2 meters but reaches a maximum of 8.5 meters at the port of Nakskov.

=== Islands ===
There are around 10 islands in the fjord along with some smaller islets. The largest islands are named Enehøje, Vejlø and Slotø.

== Inner fjord ==
The inner fjord (indrefjord) is the part of the fjord that narrows and reaches Nakskov. It is located right next to the town center. Along the inner fjord are walking tracks. The area is also good for fishing. Many bird species nest in the inner fjord area and are especially of interest for bird-watchers.

== Nature ==
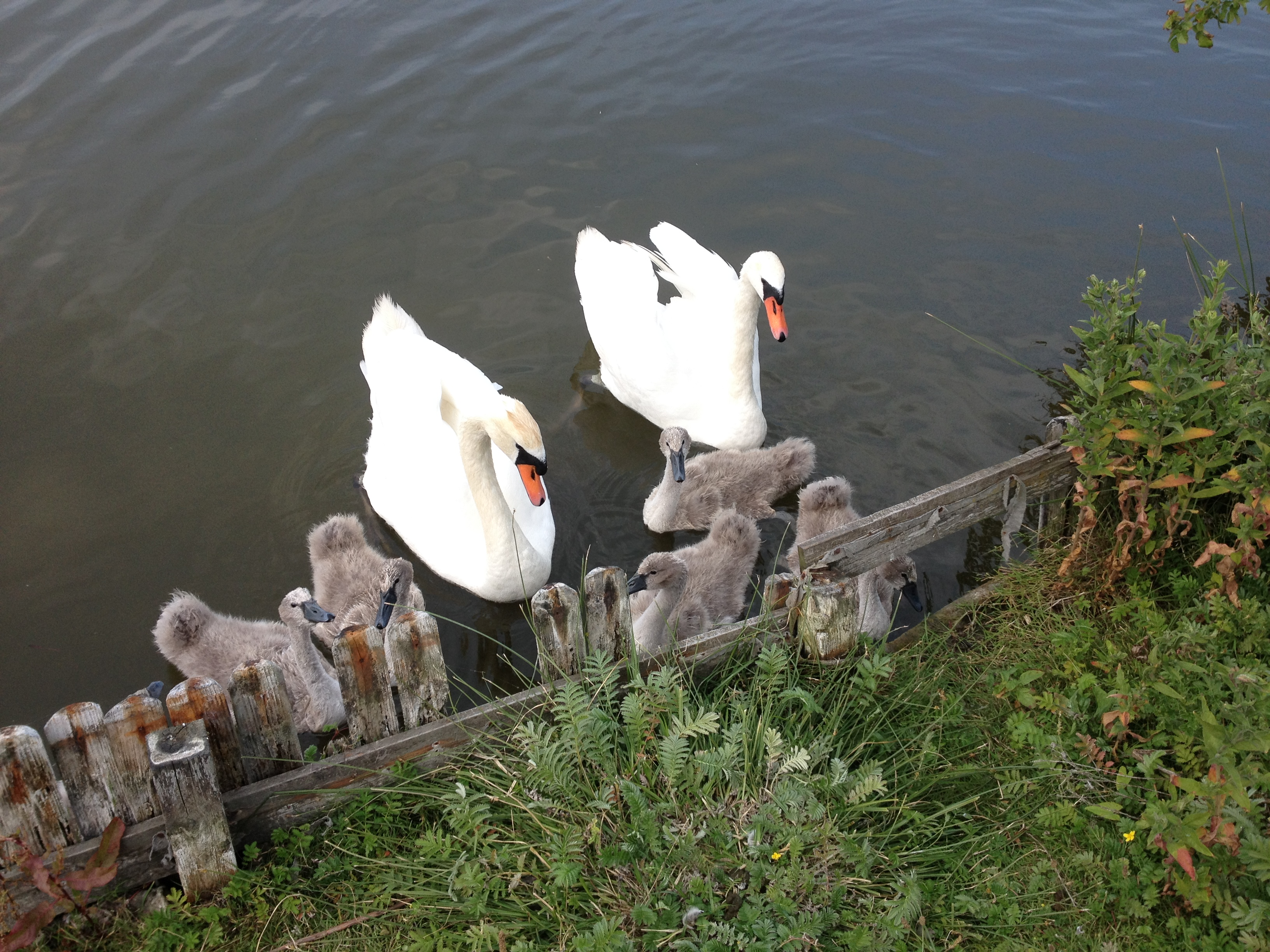
Swans with their cygnets in Nakskov Indrefjord

Nakskov fjord is a Natura 2000 protected bird habitat since May, 1983. The total surface area of the protected habitat is 85 km^{2}. Many species of birds are found in the fjord and the inner fjord area including mute swan, crested grebe, gadwall, shoveler, pochard, tufted duck and the beautiful bearded tit. During the migration season such species as little gull and black tern can also be seen. The fjord is also a protected habitat for dolphins and porpoises.

== Tourism ==
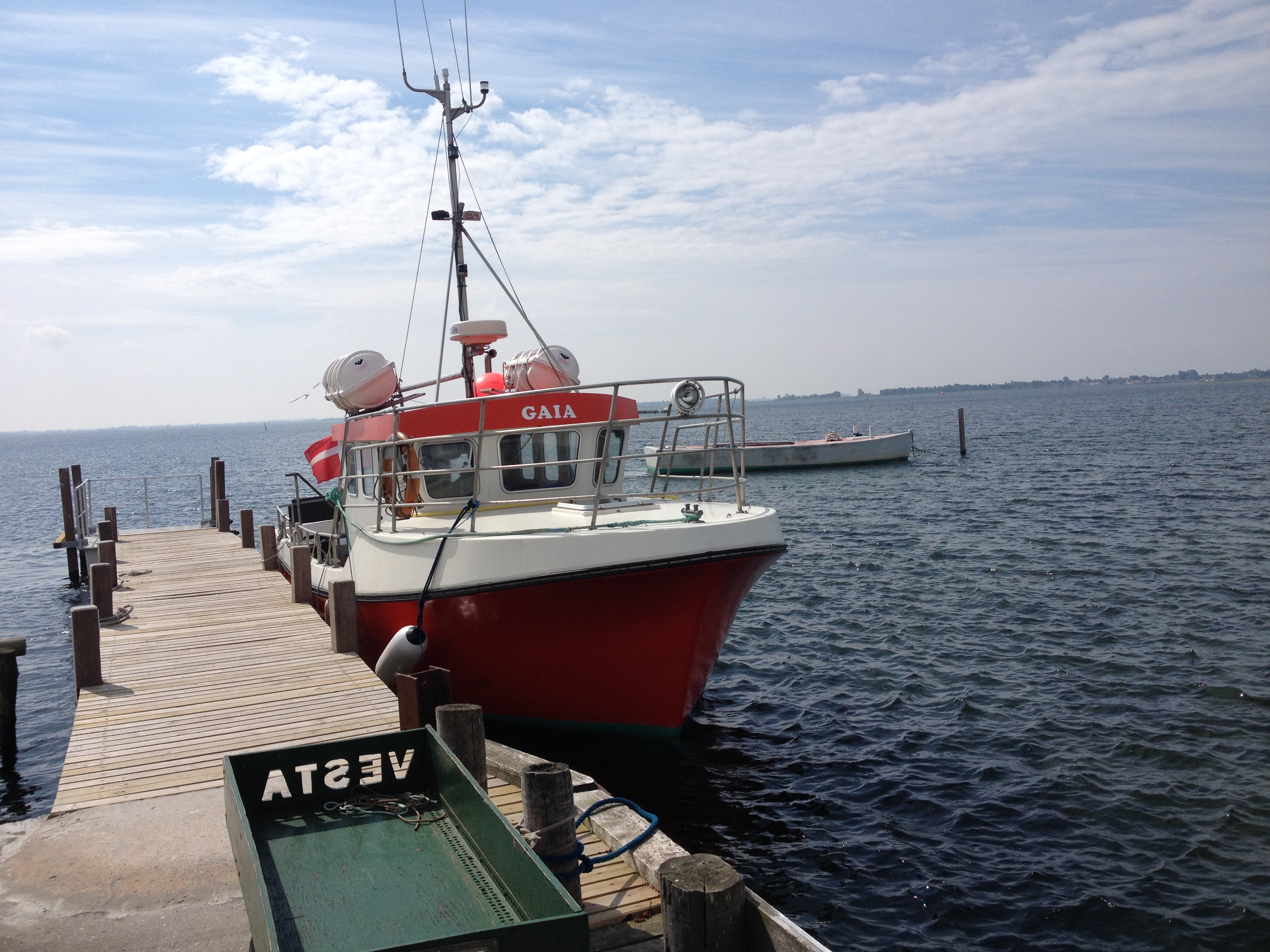
The post boat Gaia in the Nakskov fjord

The area is quite popular with tourists as well as with the local population.

Two post-boats, Vesta and Gaia, take the mail from Nakskov to the residents in these inhabited islands. Tourists can also go with these boats and enjoy the fjord and the islands.

== See also ==
- Nakskov
- Mariager Fjord
