= Langø =

Island in Denmark

Coordinates: 54°59′N 12°07′E

Geography
- Location: Baltic Sea
- Area: 1.27 km^{2} (0.49 sq mi)
- Highest point: 14

Administration
- Denmark

Demographics
- Population: 2 (2014)

Langø is an island in Denmark. It is situated in the Ulvsund between Sjælland and Møn. The island is connected to Sjælland bridge a dam built in 1919. It is privately owned.
