= Vigø =

Island in Denmark

Coordinates: 55°08′43″N 10°07′01″E

Vigø is an uninhabited island in Denmark. It is located in Helnæs Bugt in Region Syddanmark, in the southern part of the country, 170 km west of Copenhagen. The area is 0.18 square kilometers.

The terrain on Vigø is very flat. The island's highest point is 16 meters above sea level. It stretches 0.6 kilometers in a north–south direction and 0.8 kilometers in an east–west direction.
