= Rågø =

Island in Denmark

- Location within Denmark Region Zealand

Geography
- Coordinates: 54°58′0″N 11°18′30″E
- Area: 0.8 km^{2} (0.31 sq mi)

Administration
- Denmark
- Region: Region Zealand
- Municipality: Lolland Municipality

Rågø is a small uninhabited Danish island lying south of Zealand. Rågø covers an area of 0.8 km^{2}.
