= Kalvø =

Small uninhabited island in Denmark

Coordinates: 54.724657°N 11.85939°E

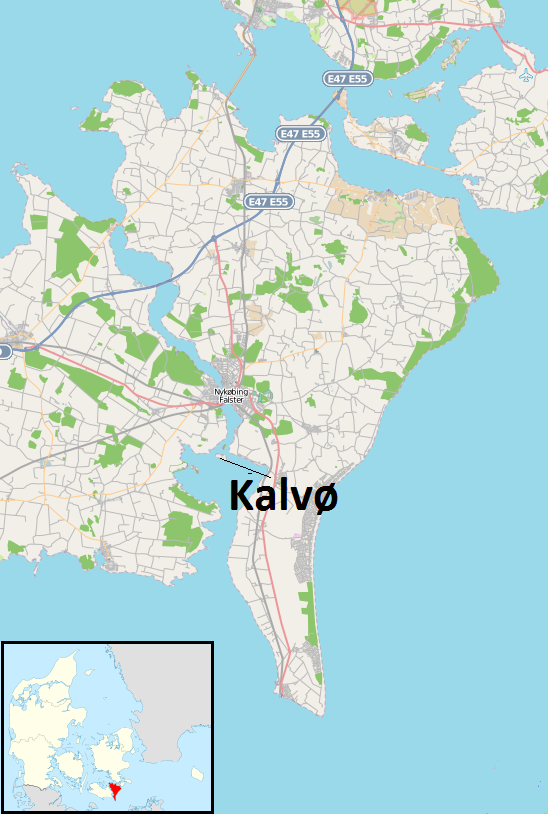
Map showing location between the Danish islands of Lolland and Falster

Kalvø is a small uninhabited island in the southern part of Guldborgsund, the strait between the Danish islands of Lolland and Falster. Its highest point is 3 metres (9.8 ft) above sea level. The 29.4 hectare protected area of Kalvø-Hasselø was created by Conservation Order in 1980, and access is prohibited during the bird breeding season.

== Description ==
Kalvø itself covers an area of 22 ha (54 acres). Today, with its grassy expanses and waterholes of various sizes, it is used for grazing young cattle during the summer months. It used to belong to farmers from Hasselø, the land being divided up into 12 parts. In 1700, there was already a law regulating the grazing of cattle on Kalvø and a similar law still exists today. There are also regulations to ensure the island's grasslands are not invaded by forest. The whole of Kalvø is a protected area. Access is forbidden from 15 March to 15 July when birds are breeding and raising their young. The rules of protection specify that Kalvø should maintain its grasslands for cattle grazing and that there should be no buildings or tents of any type, in the protected area. Chemicals may not be used to combat weeds or pests.

== Summer grazing ==
One of the advantages of keeping cattle on the island during the summer months is that there is no need for fencing. In addition, there is usually more than enough grass for the relatively few cattle grazing there. On the other hand, it is not easy to transport them to the island or to carry out the regular checks that are required. If the summer is exceptionally dry, there may not be enough grass. There are also risks of the animals contracting mastitis which can be borne by insects attracted by the watery area. As for transport to the island, the cattle are brought over in a small barge, three or four at a time, a process which often causes a soaking for the farmers as well as for the cattle.
