= Askø =

- Island
- Askø is north of Lolland (bottom center)
- Coordinates: 54°54′0″N 11°30′0″E
- Country: Denmark
- Municipality: Lolland municipality

Area
  - Total: 2.82 km^{2} (1.09 sq mi)

Population (2005)
  - Total: 55
  - Density: 20/km^{2} (51/sq mi)
- Time zone: UTC+1 (CET)
  - Summer (DST): UTC+2 (CEST)
- Postal codes: 4942

Askø is a Danish island north of Lolland. It covers an area of 2.82 km^{2} and has 55 permanent inhabitants (as of 1 January 2005) as well as hundreds of summer vacation properties. It is connected to the neighbouring island of Lilleø by a 700 metre long dam, which was constructed in 1914. Askø is connected to Kragenæs on Lolland by ferry.

In 1954, there were 170 inhabitants and one vehicle.

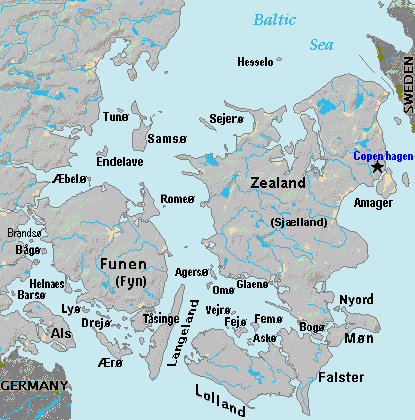
Askø island (lower right) is north of Lolland, south of Zealand island, east of Fejø & west of Falster.

In 2014 energy company SEAS-NVE discovered a Neolithic boat in a submerged settlement as it replaced sea cables by Askø Island. The boat had split and sealing mass consisting of a strip of bark and resin was found in the hole.

== See also ==
- Nearby islands: Lilleø, Fejø, Femø, Vejrø, Lolland.
