= South Funen Archipelago =

Baltic Sea between Faaborg and Svendborg

Coordinates: 55°00′N 10°30′E

Designations

Ramsar Wetland
- Designated: 2 September 1977
- Reference no.: 156

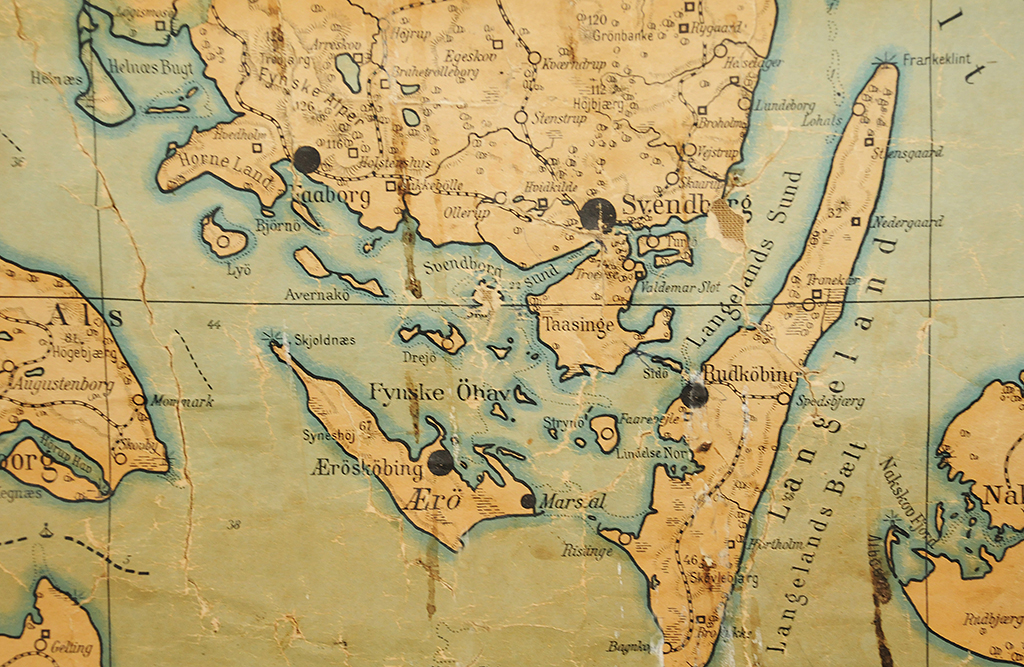
Map of the South Funen Archipelago c. 1890

The South Funen Archipelago (Danish: Det Sydfynske Øhav) is the popular name for the part of the Baltic Sea south of the ports of Faaborg and Svendborg on the Danish island of Funen. The depth of the sea is typically between 20 and 30 meters. The archipelago includes some 55 low-lying Danish islands, including Ærø, Tåsinge, Thurø, Lyø, Strynø and Avernakø.

== See also ==
- List of islands of Denmark
- Sydhavsøerne
- Danish Wadden Sea Islands
