= List of municipalities of Denmark =

This is a list of current Municipalities of Denmark. The number of municipalities was reduced from 270 to the current 98 on Monday 1 January 2007. The archipelago of Ertholmene is not part of any municipality or region but is administered by the Ministry of Defence. Area of municipalities includes water, which can make up a significant part of the total area of a municipality, i.e. Furesø and Halsnæs.

North Denmark Region (click to enlarge)

Central Denmark Region (click to enlarge)

Southern Denmark Region (click to enlarge)

Zealand Region (click to enlarge)

Capital Region (click to enlarge)

LAU-1 code ^{1}	Municipality	Administrative Center	Total Area (km²)	Population (2012-01-01)	Region
101	Copenhagen	Copenhagen	86.60	549,050	Capital
751	Aarhus	Aarhus	467.8	314,545	Central
851	Aalborg	Aalborg	1137.2	201,142	North
461	Odense	Odense	305.7	191,610	South
561	Esbjerg	Esbjerg	794.7	115,112	South
630	Vejle	Vejle	1058.8	108,021	South
147	Frederiksberg	Frederiksberg	8.1	100,215	Capital
730	Randers	Randers	747.6	95,756	Central
791	Viborg	Viborg	1408.7	93,819	Central
621	Kolding	Kolding	607.1	89,412	South
740	Silkeborg	Silkeborg	850.5	89,328	Central
657	Herning	Herning	1321.4	86,348	Central
615	Horsens	Horsens	519.8	83,598	Central
265	Roskilde	Roskilde	211.9	83,137	Zealand
370	Næstved	Næstved	676.3	81,012	Zealand
330	Slagelse	Slagelse	567.9	77,310	Zealand
540	Sønderborg	Sønderborg	496.8	76,094	South
157	Gentofte	Charlottenlund	25.6	72,814	Capital
316	Holbæk	Holbæk	577.3	69,415	Zealand
860	Hjørring	Hjørring	926.2	66,178	North
159	Gladsaxe	Buddinge	24.9	65,303	Capital
376	Guldborgsund	Nykøbing Falster	899.7	61,913	Zealand
217	Helsingør	Helsingør	118.9	61,493	Capital
813	Frederikshavn	Frederikshavn	650.3	61,158	North
580	Aabenraa	Aabenraa	940.7	59,600	South
479	Svendborg	Svendborg	415.5	58,551	South
746	Skanderborg	Skanderborg	416.7	58,008	Central
760	Ringkøbing-Skjern	Ringkøbing and Skjern	1469.6	57,892	Central
259	Køge	Køge	256.5	57,307	Zealand
661	Holstebro	Holstebro	793	57,153	Central
510	Haderslev	Haderslev	815.9	56,188	South
230	Rudersdal	Holte	73.4	54,630	Capital
173	Lyngby-Taarbæk	Kongens Lyngby	38.8	53,251	Capital
430	Faaborg-Midtfyn	Ringe	633.7	51,635	South
167	Hvidovre	Hvidovre	23	50,600	Capital
573	Varde	Varde	1240	50,193	South
607	Fredericia	Fredericia	133.6	50,193	South
326	Kalundborg	Kalundborg	575.2	48,632	Zealand
219	Hillerød	Hillerød	214.9	48,203	Capital
169	Høje-Taastrup	Taastrup	78.4	48,081	Capital
151	Ballerup	Ballerup	33.8	47,994	Capital
253	Greve	Greve Strand	60.4	47,942	Zealand
779	Skive	Skive	683.3	47,620	Central
710	Favrskov	Hadsten, Hinnerup, Hammel and Hvorslev	540.3	47,117	Central
766	Hedensted	Hedensted	551.3	46,029	Central
390	Vordingborg	Vordingborg	619.5	45,804	Zealand
360	Lolland	Maribo	881.9	45,241	Zealand
787	Thisted	Thisted	1068.6	44,908	North
250	Frederikssund	Frederikssund	247	44,345	Capital
575	Vejen	Vejen	813.5	42,785	South
846	Mariagerfjord	Hobro and Hadsund	718.2	42,429	North
240	Egedal	Ølstykke	125.8	41,821	Capital
706	Syddjurs	Rønde	689.8	41,815	Central
420	Assens	Assens	511.3	41,443	South
400	Bornholm (merged 2003)	Rønne	588.1	41,303	Capital
185	Tårnby	Tårnby	66	41,151	Capital
756	Ikast-Brande	Ikast	733.4	40,658	Central
270	Gribskov	Helsinge	279.5	40,603	Capital
210	Fredensborg	Kokkedal	112.1	39,565	Capital
550	Tønder	Tønder	1281.8	39,083	South
849	Jammerbugt	Aabybro	863.9	38,611	North
190	Furesø	Værløse	56.8	38,243	Capital
707	Norddjurs	Grenaa	720.9	37,876	Central
410	Middelfart	Middelfart	298.8	37,612	South
820	Vesthimmerland	Aars	769.9	37,534	North
175	Rødovre	Rødovre	12.1	36,883	Capital
810	Brønderslev	Brønderslev	633	35,754	North
320	Faxe	Haslev	405	35,110	Zealand
153	Brøndby	Brøndbyvester	21	34,084	Capital
329	Ringsted	Ringsted	294.6	33,153	Zealand
306	Odsherred	Højby	354	32,640	Zealand
450	Nyborg	Nyborg	276.7	31,486	South
260	Halsnæs	Frederiksværk	121.8	30,980	Capital
340	Sorø	Sorø	308.4	29,393	Zealand
480	Nordfyn	Bogense	452.3	29,330	South
840	Rebild	Støvring	621.3	28,911	North
165	Albertslund	Albertslund	23.2	27,864	Capital
350	Lejre	Hvalsø	238.9	26,887	Zealand
163	Herlev	Herlev	12.1	26,608	Capital
530	Billund	Grindsted	540.3	26,220	South
223	Hørsholm	Hørsholm	31.3	24,365	Capital
201	Allerød	Lillerød	67.5	24,043	Capital
440	Kerteminde	Kerteminde	205.8	23,793	South
671	Struer	Struer	246.2	22,098	Central
336	Stevns	Store Heddinge	250.2	21,855	Zealand
727	Odder	Odder	223.6	21,749	Central
161	Glostrup	Glostrup	13.3	21,650	Capital
773	Morsø	Nykøbing Mors	366.5	21,474	North
665	Lemvig	Lemvig	502.8	21,384	Central
269	Solrød	Solrød Strand	40.1	21,156	Zealand
183	Ishøj	Ishøj	26.4	21,087	Capital
187	Vallensbæk	Vallensbæk	9.5	14,565	Capital
155	Dragør	Dragør and Store Magleby	18.3	13,692	Capital
482	Langeland	Rudkøbing	288.8	13,094	South
492	Ærø (merged 2006)	Marstal	90.1	6,636	South
741	Samsø	Tranebjerg	113.5	3,889	Central
563	Fanø	Nordby	54.6	3,251	South
825	Læsø	Byrum	118.9	1,897	North

^1 Used for various statistical and administrative purposes.

== See also ==
- Municipalities of Denmark
- List of municipalities of Denmark (1970–2006)
- List of urban areas in Denmark by population
- List of the most populated municipalities in the Nordic countries
