= 2025 Langeland municipal election =

Municipal election in Denmark

| ← 2021 | 18 November 2025 | 2029 → |

All 15 seats to the Langeland municipal council 8 seats needed for a majority
- Turnout: 7,581 (73.9%) ▲1.2%
| | First party | Second party | Third party |
|---|---|---|---|
| | C | A | V |
| Party | Conservatives | Social Democrats | Venstre |
| Last election | 1 seat, 10.1% | 2 seats, 13.7% | 5 seats, 28.7% |
| Seats won | 7 | 3 | 2 |
| Seat change | ▲6 | ▲1 | ▼3 |
| Popular vote | 2,522 | 1,046 | 901 |
| Percentage | 33.8% | 14.0% | 12.1% |
| Swing | ▲23.8% | ▲0.4% | ▼16.7% |
| | Fourth party | Fifth party | Sixth party |
| | F | L | B |
| Party | Green Left | Lokallisten Langeland | Social Liberals |
| Last election | 6 seats, 34.3% | Did not stand | 1 seat, 4.7% |
| Seats won | 2 | 1 | 0 |
| Seat change | ▼4 | ▲1 | ▼1 |
| Popular vote | 814 | 568 | 339 |
| Percentage | 10.9% | 7.6% | 4.5% |
| Swing | ▼23.3% | New | ▼0.1% |
Mayor before election
Tonni Hansen
Green Left
Mayor after election
Jørgen Nielsen
Conservatives

The 2025 Langeland Municipal election was held on November 18, 2025, to elect the 15 members to sit in the regional council for the Langeland Municipal council, in the period of 2026 to 2029. Jørgen Nielsen from the Conservatives, would win the mayoral position.

== Background ==
Following the 2021 election, Tonni Hansen from Green Left became mayor for his second term, marking the only municipal election in the 2021 municipal elections, where the Green Left won the most votes and seats. However, Hansen revealed on August 12, 2024, that he does not intend to run for a third term Ulrik Pihl was in the lead to replace Hansen as the new mayoral candidate from Green Left, for this election. However on April 28, 2024, it was revealed that he had decided to drop his candidacy. The party planned to pick a candidate on May 20, 2025 in a meeting, but this was moved to June 4, 2025, leaving the party without a mayoral candidate at the moment.

Throughout the current period, Venstre, who became the second largest party in the 2021 election, had lost 4 of its 5 seats, at a point.

== Electoral system ==
For elections to Danish municipalities, a number varying from 9 to 31 are chosen to be elected to the municipal council. The seats are then allocated using the D'Hondt method and a closed list proportional representation. Langeland Municipality had 15 seats in 2025.

== Electoral alliances ==
=== Electoral Alliance 1 ===
| Party | | Political alignment |
|---|---|---|
| A | Social Democrats | Centre-left |
| B | Social Liberals | Centre to Centre-left |
| V | Venstre | Centre-right |

=== Electoral Alliance 2 ===
| Party | | Political alignment |
|---|---|---|
| C | Conservatives | Centre-right |
| I | Liberal Alliance | Centre-right to Right-wing |
| L | Lokallisten Langeland | Local politics |
| M | Moderates | Centre to Centre-right |
| Æ | Denmark Democrats | Right-wing to Far-right |

=== Electoral Alliance 3 ===
| Party | | Political alignment |
|---|---|---|
| F | Green Left | Centre-left to Left-wing |
| Ø | Red-Green Alliance | Left-wing to Far-Left |

== Results by polling station ==
| Division | A | B | C | F | I | L | M | O | V | Æ | Ø |
| Division | % | % | % | % | % | % | % | % | % | % | % |
|---|---|---|---|---|---|---|---|---|---|---|---|
| Bagenkop | 9.5 | 1.9 | 35.6 | 9.8 | 3.0 | 4.2 | 1.1 | 3.9 | 23.9 | 3.7 | 3.5 |
| Humble | 11.9 | 3.0 | 35.3 | 8.8 | 4.9 | 5.0 | 2.6 | 4.5 | 16.1 | 4.0 | 4.1 |
| Rudkøbing | 16.0 | 5.1 | 34.0 | 12.1 | 3.9 | 5.2 | 3.6 | 2.4 | 11.5 | 1.9 | 4.2 |
| Tullebølle | 17.0 | 4.1 | 35.8 | 11.1 | 4.4 | 7.8 | 2.8 | 2.6 | 7.9 | 3.5 | 3.0 |
| Snøde | 8.5 | 6.8 | 27.6 | 9.7 | 4.7 | 23.4 | 2.5 | 4.9 | 6.1 | 2.9 | 2.9 |

== Results ==
| Party | | Votes | % | +/- | Seats | +/- |
Langeland Municipality
| C | Conservatives | 2,522 | 33.84 | +23.77 | 7 | +6 |
| A | Social Democrats | 1,046 | 14.04 | +0.35 | 3 | +1 |
| V | Venstre | 901 | 12.09 | -16.65 | 2 | -3 |
| F | Green Left | 814 | 10.92 | -23.34 | 2 | -4 |
| L | Lokallisten Langeland | 568 | 7.62 | New | 1 | New |
| B | Social Liberals | 339 | 4.55 | -0.13 | 0 | -1 |
| I | Liberal Alliance | 311 | 4.17 | New | 0 | New |
| Ø | Red-Green Alliance | 284 | 3.81 | +1.63 | 0 | 0 |
| O | Danish People's Party | 240 | 3.22 | -0.37 | 0 | 0 |
| M | Moderates | 221 | 2.97 | New | 0 | New |
| Æ | Denmark Democrats | 206 | 2.76 | New | 0 | New |
| Total | | 7,452 | 100 | N/A | 15 | N/A |
| Invalid votes | | 23 | 0.22 | -0.03 | | |
| Blank votes | | 106 | 1.03 | +0.20 | | |
| Turnout | | 7,581 | 73.94 | +1.18 | | |
Source: valg.dk

== Opinion polls ==
| Polling firm | Fieldwork date | Sample size | F | V | A | C | B | O | Ø | I | L | M | Æ | Others | Lead |
|---|---|---|---|---|---|---|---|---|---|---|---|---|---|---|---|
| Epinion | 4 Sep - 13 Oct 2025 | 240 | 11.4 | 15.5 | 21.2 | 15.7 | 3.5 | 5.9 | 3.1 | 5.3 | – | 5.0 | 8.0 | 5.4 | 5.5 |
| 2024 european parliament election | 9 Jun 2024 | | 17.4 | 18.0 | 17.5 | 6.1 | 4.1 | 8.9 | 6.4 | 4.6 | – | 4.7 | 10.6 | – | 0.5 |
| 2022 general election | 1 Nov 2022 | | 6.8 | 13.9 | 36.1 | 3.2 | 1.4 | 3.5 | 3.7 | 4.1 | – | 8.1 | 12.2 | – | 22.2 |
| 2021 regional election | 16 Nov 2021 | | 13.8 | 44.8 | 18.4 | 5.0 | 3.6 | 3.6 | 4.4 | 0.3 | – | – | – | – | 26.4 |
| 2021 municipal election | 16 Nov 2021 | | 34.3 (6) | 28.7 (5) | 13.7 (2) | 10.1 (1) | 4.7 (1) | 3.6 (0) | 2.2 (0) | – | – | – | – | – | 5.6 |
