= 2021 Langeland municipal election =

| ← 2017 | 16 November 2021 | 2025 → |

All 15 seats to the Langeland Municipal Council 8 seats needed for a majority
- Turnout: 7,732 (72.8%) ▼2.4pp
| | First party | Second party | Third party |
|---|---|---|---|
| | F | V | A |
| Party | Green Left | Venstre | Social Democrats |
| Last election | 6 seats, 32,9% | 4 seats, 23.0% | 3 seats, 14.1% |
| Seats won | 6 | 5 | 2 |
| Seat change | 0 | ▲1 | ▼1 |
| Popular vote | 2,612 | 2,191 | 1,043 |
| Percentage | 34.3% | 28.7% | 13.7% |
| Swing | ▲1.4% | ▲5.7% | ▼0.4% |
| | Fourth party | Fifth party | Sixth party |
| | C | B | O |
| Party | Conservatives | Social Liberals | Danish People's Party |
| Last election | 1 seat, 9.2% | 0 seats, 3.2% | 1 seat, 7.2% |
| Seats won | 1 | 1 | 0 |
| Seat change | 0 | ▲1 | ▼1 |
| Popular vote | 768 | 357 | 274 |
| Percentage | 10.1% | 4.7% | 3.6% |
| Swing | ▲0.9% | ▲1.5% | ▼3.6% |
Mayor before election
Tonni Hansen
Green Left
Mayor after election
Tonni Hansen
Green Left

In the 2017 Danish local elections, the Green Left became the biggest party in Langeland municipality, and Tonni Hansen from the party won the mayor's position, the only municipality in which they won the position of the 98 municipalities.

In 2020 he faced a challenge, as the government planned a pre-removal detention center to be built in Langeland. People of Langeland began protesting, and his party's position on the political spectrum suggested that he should be open to the idea. Eventually, he ended up coming out against the plans of the government. He would eventually succeed with his opposition on the topic.

He was expected to be re-elected for this election.

In the election result, the Green Left would enjoy a small increase in their vote share. The traditional red bloc would win 9 of the 15 seats, and Tonni Hansen looked destined to continue for a second term. It was eventually confirmed that he had secured a second term.

Langeland municipality was the only municipality in the 2017 Danish local elections, where the Green Left became the biggest party, however they also won the mayor's position in Hvidovre Municipality.

== Electoral system ==
For elections to Danish municipalities, a number varying from 9 to 31 are chosen to be elected to the municipal council. The seats are then allocated using the D'Hondt method and a closed list proportional representation. Langeland Municipality had 15 seats in 2021

Unlike in Danish General Elections, in elections to municipal councils, electoral alliances are allowed.

== Electoral alliances ==
=== Electoral Alliance 1 ===
| Party | | Political alignment |
|---|---|---|
| C | Conservatives | Centre-right |
| V | Venstre | Centre-right |

=== Electoral Alliance 2 ===
| Party | | Political alignment |
|---|---|---|
| F | Green Left | Centre-left to Left-wing |
| Ø | Red–Green Alliance | Left-wing to Far-Left |

=== Electoral Alliance 3 ===
| Party | | Political alignment |
|---|---|---|
| A | Social Democrats | Centre-left |
| B | Social Liberals | Centre to Centre-left |

== Results by polling station ==
| Division | A | B | C | D | F | O | V | Ø |
| Division | % | % | % | % | % | % | % | % |
|---|---|---|---|---|---|---|---|---|
| Bagenkop | 11.0 | 3.9 | 7.1 | 1.9 | 28.5 | 4.2 | 41.6 | 1.7 |
| Humble | 13.8 | 3.1 | 8.2 | 3.1 | 29.8 | 5.9 | 34.6 | 1.5 |
| Lindelse | 15.6 | 4.1 | 8.3 | 3.0 | 28.0 | 3.8 | 35.3 | 2.0 |
| Rudkøbing | 14.7 | 3.8 | 10.8 | 2.3 | 38.8 | 2.5 | 24.8 | 2.3 |
| Hou | 8.6 | 11.7 | 8.9 | 2.9 | 35.3 | 5.0 | 25.5 | 2.0 |
| Lejbølle | 12.5 | 6.6 | 14.3 | 4.8 | 30.9 | 2.0 | 25.5 | 3.3 |
| Tullebølle | 14.2 | 4.3 | 11.8 | 3.5 | 30.9 | 4.0 | 29.6 | 1.8 |
| Strynø | 18.1 | 3.6 | 9.4 | 1.4 | 46.4 | 2.2 | 11.6 | 7.2 |

== Results ==
| Party | | Votes | % | +/- | Seats | +/- |
Langeland Municipality
| F | Green Left | 2,612 | 34.26 | +1.37 | 6 | 0 |
| V | Venstre | 2,191 | 28.74 | +5.72 | 5 | +1 |
| A | Social Democrats | 1,043 | 13.68 | -0.40 | 2 | -1 |
| C | Conservatives | 768 | 10.07 | +0.88 | 1 | 0 |
| B | Social Liberals | 357 | 4.68 | +1.49 | 1 | +1 |
| O | Danish People's Party | 274 | 3.59 | -3.65 | 0 | -1 |
| D | New Right | 212 | 2.78 | New | 0 | New |
| Ø | Red-Green Alliance | 166 | 2.18 | -0.64 | 0 | 0 |
| Total | | 7,623 | 100 | N/A | 15 | N/A |
| Invalid votes | | 27 | 0.25 | -0.06 | | |
| Blank votes | | 82 | 0.77 | -0.57 | | |
| Turnout | | 7,732 | 72.76 | -2.42 | | |
Source: valg.dk
