= Tranekær Municipality =

Tranekær Municipality Tranekær Kommune
- Former municipality
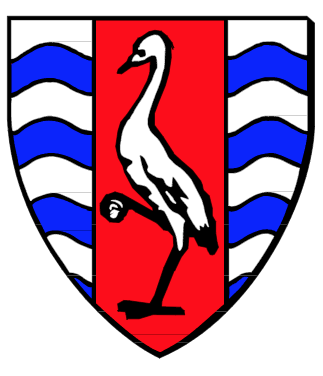
- Coat of arms

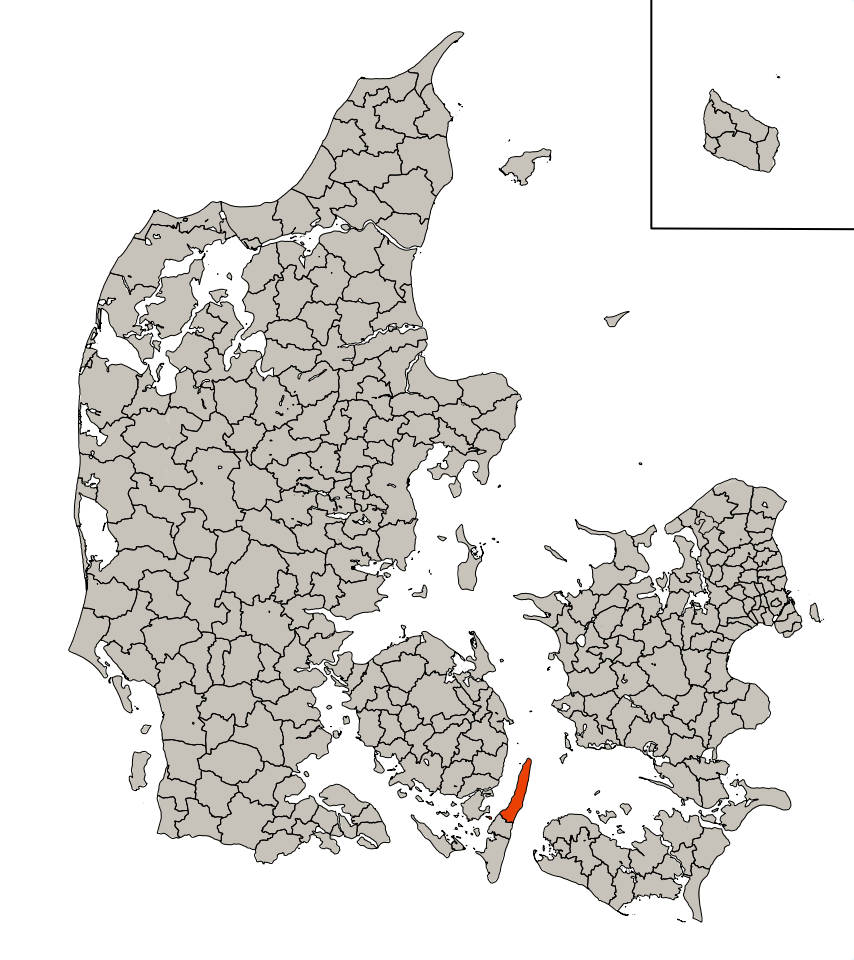
- Country: Denmark
- County: Funen
- Established: 1 April 1970
- Dissolved: 31 December 2006
- Seat: Tranekær

Government
  - Last mayor: Jørgen Nielsen (V)

Area
  - Total: 107.45 km^{2} (41.49 sq mi)

Population (2006)
  - Total: 3,439
  - Density: 32.01/km^{2} (82.89/sq mi)
- Time zone: UTC1 (CET)
  - Summer (DST): UTC2 (CEST)
- Municipal code: 487

Until 1 January 2007 Tranekær Municipality was a municipality (Danish: kommune) in the former Funen County, on the northern parts of the island of Langeland. It also included the island of Siø. The municipality covered an area of 107.45 km^{2}, and had a total population of 3,439 (2006). Its last mayor was Jørgen Nielsen, a member of the Venstres political party.

Tranekær Municipality bordered Rudkøbing Municipality to the south and east, and connected to Svendborg Municipality from Siø through the Siøsund Bridge.

The municipality ceased to exist as the result of Kommunalreformen 2007 (the Municipality Reform of 2007). It was merged with the Sydlangeland and Rudkøbing municipalities to form the new Langeland municipality. The new municipality belongs to the Region of Southern Denmark.

== History ==
In the Middle Ages, when Denmark was divided into hundreds, Langeland was divided into two hundreds. These were Langeland's Northern Hundred (Danish: Langelands Nørre Herred) and Langeland's Southern Hundred (Danish: Langelands Sønder Herred), the latter also including the island of Siø. The two hundreds on Langeland were part of the fief (Danish: len) of Tranekær Fief, which became Tranekær County in 1662. In 1793 the two counties of Tranekær and Nyborg were merged to form Svendborg County, which was merged with Odense County in 1970 to form Funen County (Danish: Fyns Amt). This county was dissolved in 2007, and the entirety of Funen County became a part of the Region of Southern Denmark.

In 1842 Denmark was divided into smaller administrative divisions, namely parish municipalities (Danish: sognekommunner). The borders of these municipalities were largely based on the country's parishes. In the 1970 municipal reform these parish municipalities were dissolved. Three parish municipalities had merged already in 1966 to form Tranekær Parish Municipality, which then became Tranekær Municipality in 1970. This municipality lasted until 2007 when it was merged with the municipalities of Sydlangeland and Rudkøbing.

=== Historical divisions ===
Historical municipal divisions of Langeland Municipality
2007	1970	1966	1842	Towns
Langeland Mun.	Tranekær Mun.	Tranekær Parish Mun.	Snøde-Stoense-Hov Parish Mun.	Lohals
Langeland Mun.	Tranekær Mun.	Tranekær Parish Mun.	Snøde-Stoense-Hov Parish Mun.	Snøde
Langeland Mun.	Tranekær Mun.	Tranekær Parish Mun.	Bøstrup Parish Mun.	Bøstrup
Langeland Mun.	Tranekær Mun.	Tranekær Parish Mun.	Tranekær-Tullebølle Parish Mun.	Tullebølle
Langeland Mun.	Rudkøbing Mun.			
Langeland Mun.	Sydlangeland Mun.			

== Towns ==
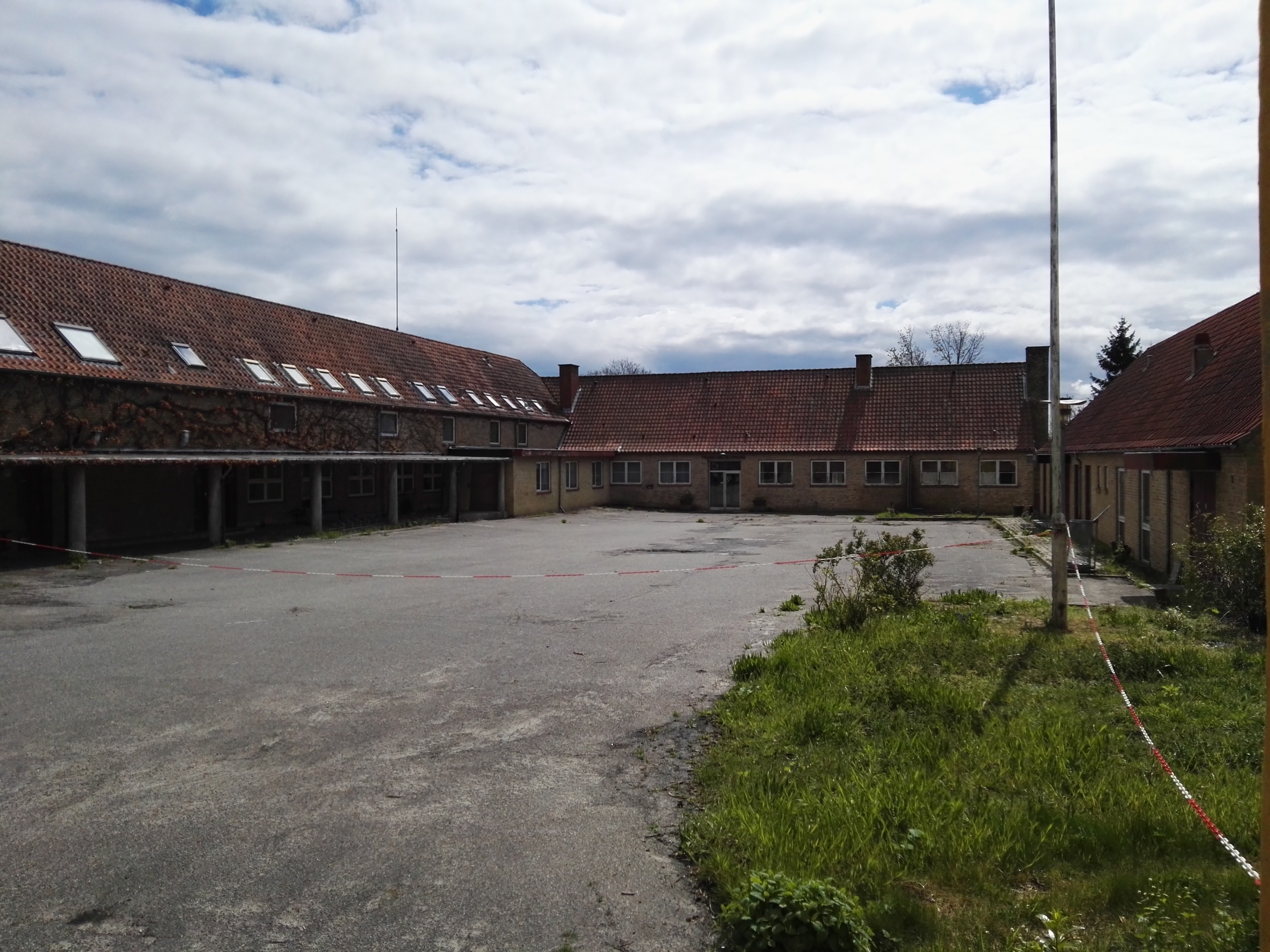
Former city hall in Tranekær.

Approximately half of the municipality's population lived in rural areas or smaller villages. The municipality's main seat of Tranekær is in this category, being a small village. The other half of the population lived in the municipality's three largest settlements of Lohals, Snøde and Tullebølle.

Tranekær was located centrally in the municipality.

Below is the populations from 2006 of the three larger settlements of the municipality.

Tullebølle	857
Lohals	520
Snøde	352

== Politics ==
=== Municipal council ===
Below are the municipal council elected since the municipality's creation in 1970 and until 2001, which was the last election before the municipality was dissolved.

Election	Party							Total seats	Elected mayor
Election	A	B	C	F	O	V	Z	Total seats	Elected mayor
1970	5	3	1			6		15	Jens Sørensen (V)
1974	5	2	1			6	1	15	Lars Christian Christensen (V)
1978	6	2	1			5	1	15	Svend Aage Hansen (V)
1981	5	1	1			7	1	15	Svend Aage Hansen (V)
1985	5	1	2	1		6		15	Svend Aage Hansen (V)
1989	5		1			6	1	13	Svend Aage Hansen (V)
1993	5		1			6	1	13	Svend Aage Hansen (V)
1997	4		1			5	1	11	Svend Aage Hansen (V)
2001	4		1		1	5		11	Jørgen Nielsen (V)
Data from Statistikbanken.dk and editions of Kommunal Aarbog

=== Mayors ===
Since the creation of the municipality in 1970 and until it was dissolved in 2007, the mayors of Tranekær Municipality were:

#	Mayor	Party	Term
1	Jens Sørensen	Venstre	1970-1974
2	Lars Christian Christensen	Venstre	1974-1978
3	Åge Nielsen	Social Liberal Party	1978-1979
4	Svend Aage Hansen	Venstre	1979-2002
5	Jørgen Nielsen	Venstre	2002-2007

== Parishes ==
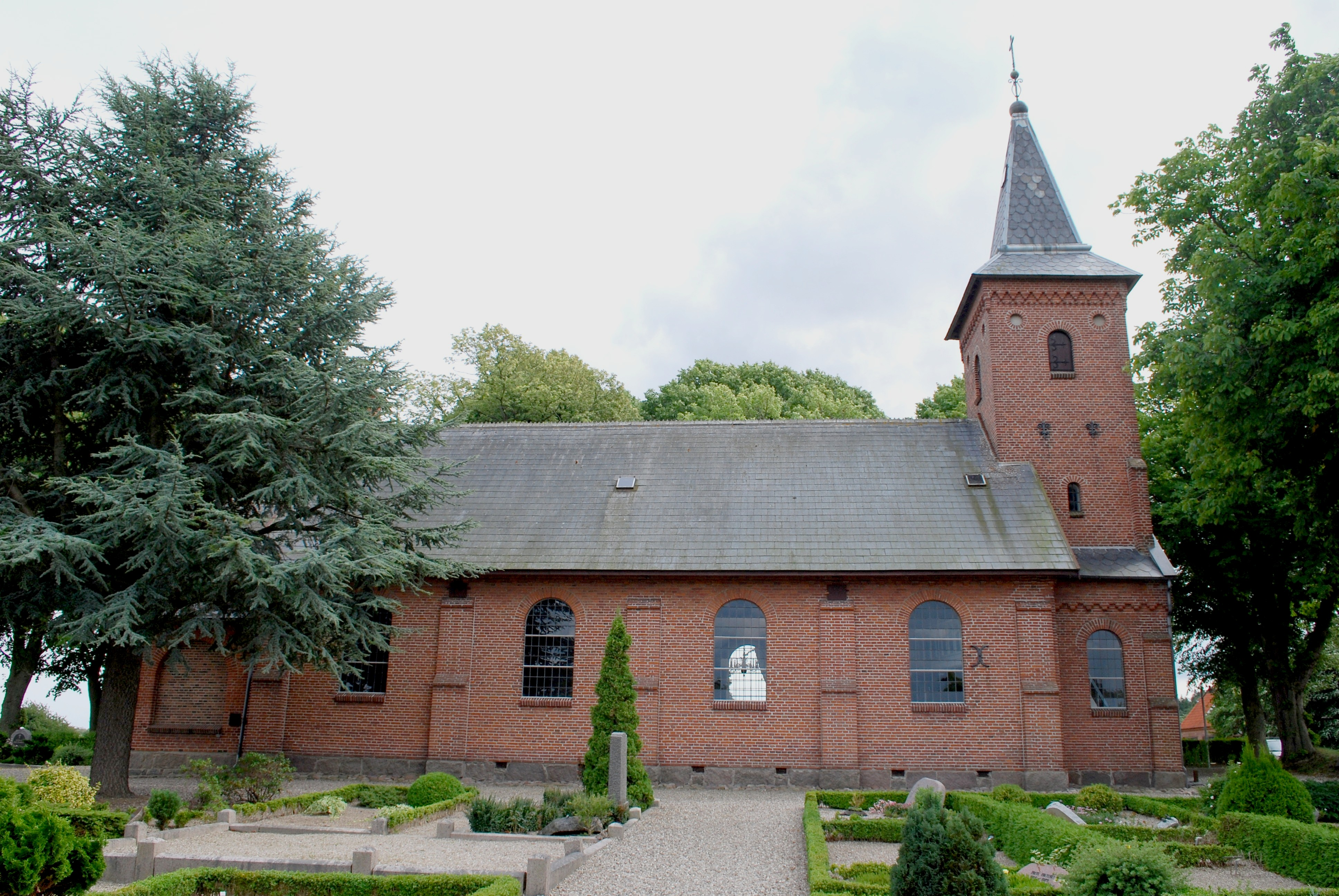
Hou Church

The municipality consisted of six parishes and six churches.

- Bøstrup Parish (Bøstrup Church)
- Hou Parish (Hou Church)
- Snøde Parish (Snøde Church)
- Stoense Parish (Stoense Church)
- Tranekær Parish (Tranekær Church)
- Tullebølle Parish (Tullebølle Church)

== Symbols ==
Tranekær Municipality's coat of arms was a white crane on a red strip, covering a blue and white ocean.
