= Bjarne Nielsen =

Danish politician (born 1957)

Mayor of Langeland Municipality
- In office 1 January 2010 – 31 December 2017
- Preceded by: Knud Gether (T)
- Succeeded by: Tonni Hansen (F)

Personal details
- Born: 2 October 1957 (age 68) Langeland, Denmark
- Party: Venstre

Bjarne Nielsen (born 2 October 1957) is a Danish politician. He is a member of the Venstre political party. From 2010 to 2017 he was the mayor of Langeland Municipality, and has been in the municipal council since the municipality's creation in 2007. Before that he sat in the municipal council of Sydlangeland Municipality from 1994 and until it was merged with Tranekær Municipality and Rudkøbing Municipality in 2007. He has a military background.
