= Knud Gether =

Danish politician

Mayor of Langeland Municipality
- In office 1 January 2007 – 31 December 2009
- Preceded by: None
- Succeeded by: Bjarne Nielsen (V)

Mayor of Sydlangeland Municipality
- In office 1 January 1994 – 31 December 2006
- Preceded by: Helge Larsen (V)
- Succeeded by: None

Personal details
- Born: 8 December 1946 (age 79) Frederiksberg, Denmark
- Party: Venstre
- Other political affiliations: Borgerlisten Langeland

Knud Gether (born 8 December 1946) is a Danish politician. He is a member of the Venstre political party. He was formerly a member of a local party, called Borgerlisten Langeland, and has been a member of Langeland Municipality's municipal council since the municipality's creation in 2007. Before that he sat in the municipal council of Sydlangeland Municipality from 1977, and was also the municipality's mayor from 1994, and until it was merged with Tranekær Municipality and Rudkøbing Municipality in 2007.
