= Siøsund Bridge =

Road bridge in Denmark

Siøsund Bridge Siøsundbroen
- Coordinates: 54°57′50″N 10°39′32″E
- Carries: Pedestrians; Bicycles; Motor vehicles
- Crosses: Siøsund

Characteristics
- Design: Box girder bridge
- Material: Concrete
- Total length: 558.0 m (1,831 ft)
- Width: 12.4 m (41 ft)
- No. of spans: 20
- Piers in water: 19
- No. of lanes: 2

History
- Construction start: 1957
- Construction end: 1960
- Opened: 22 October 1960

The Siøsund Bridge (Danish: Siøsundbroen) is a road bridge that connects the Danish islands of Tåsinge and Siø. It crosses Siøsund, a shallow strait that allowed much of the link to be built as a causeway, the Siø Causeway or Siø Dam (Danish: Siødæmningen).

The bridge is a low box girder bridge that does not allow the passage of ships. It consists of 20 identical spans, each 27 metres (89 ft) long, and was the first bridge in Denmark to be built from prefabricated concrete box girders. The road deck is 7.0 metres (23 ft) wide, with a 2.5 m (8 ft) pavement on either side.

The bridge and causeway are part of route 9 which also connects Tåsinge to Funen via the Svendborgsund Bridge and Siø to Langeland via the Langeland Bridge.
