= Langeland Municipality =

Langeland Municipality Langeland Kommune (Danish)
- Municipality
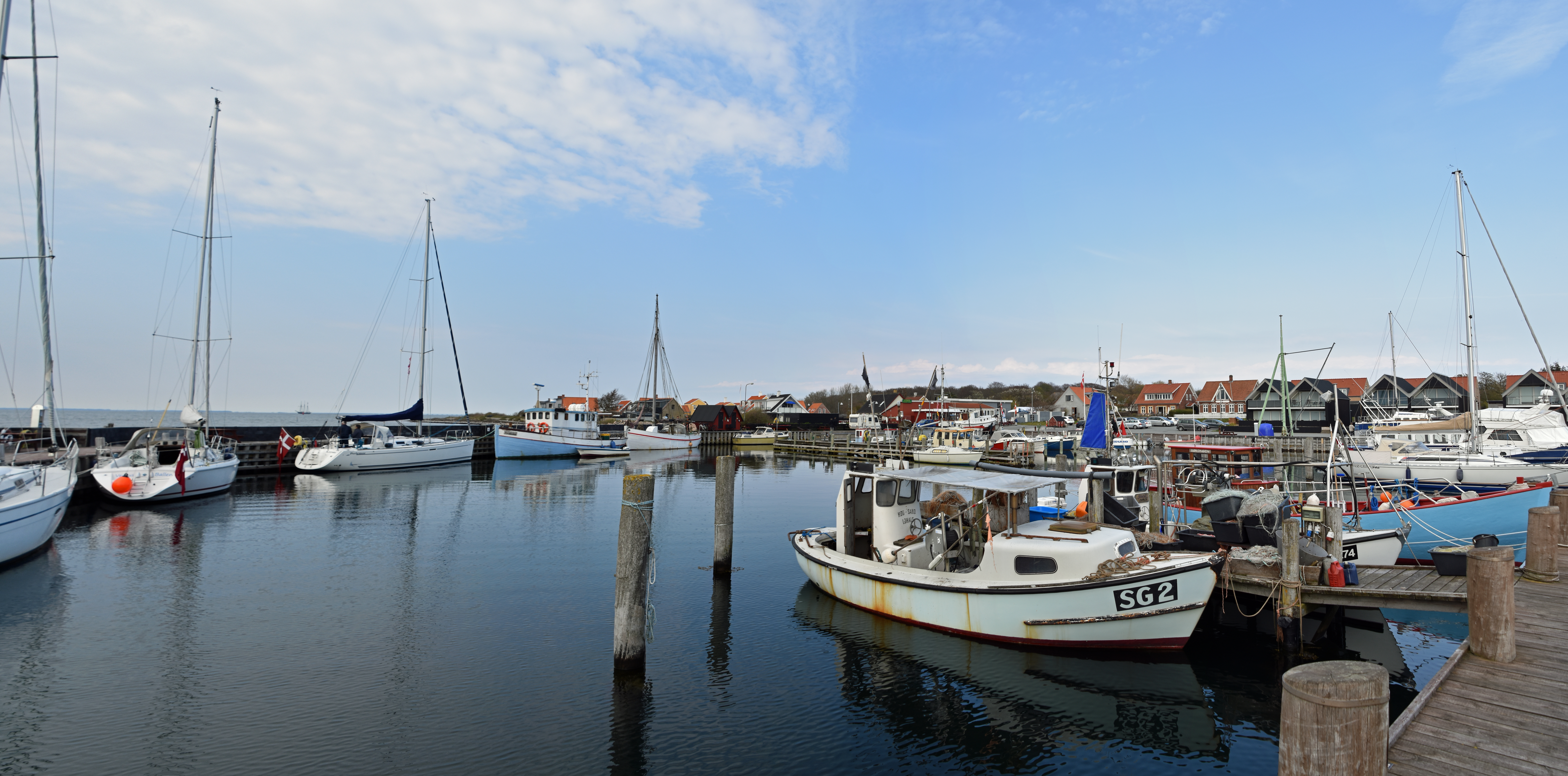
- Lohals Harbour

- Coat of arms

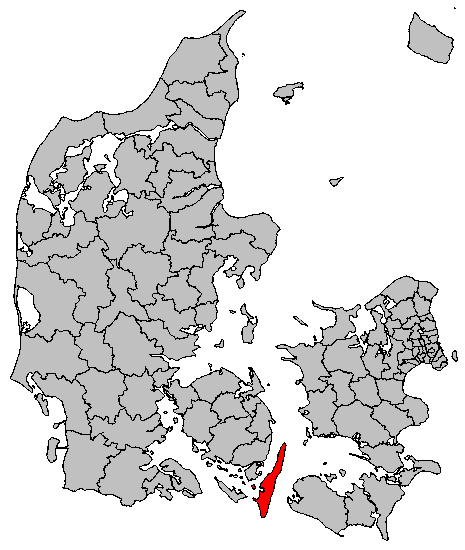
- Coordinates: 55°00′00″N 10°50′00″E
- Country: Denmark
- Region: Southern Denmark
- Established: January 1, 2007
- Seat: Rudkøbing

Government
  - Mayor: Tonni Hansen (F)

Area
  - Total: 290.30 km^{2} (112.09 sq mi)

Population (1. January 2026)
  - Total: 11,841
  - Density: 40.789/km^{2} (105.64/sq mi)
- Time zone: UTC1 (CET)
  - Summer (DST): UTC2 (CEST)
- Postal code: 5900
- Municipal code: 482
- Website: www.langelandkommune.dk

Langeland Municipality (Danish: Langeland Kommune) is a kommune in the Region of Southern Denmark, located entirely on the island of Langeland and a number of smaller surrounding islands. The municipality covers an area of 290.30 km^{2}, and has a total population of 11,841 (2026). Being an island, it has no land borders with any other municipality, though it connects to Svendborg Municipality through the Siøsund Bridge. There are connections by ferry to Ærø Municipality and Lolland Municipality. Its mayor is Tonni Hansen, a member of the Socialist People's Party. The main town and the site of its municipal council is the city of Rudkøbing.

Besides the island of Langeland, the municipality also consists of the inhabited islands of Strynø, Siø, Langø and Lindø as well as the uninhabited islands of Lille Græsholm, Bredholm, Grensholm, Strynø Kalv, Vogterholm, Bondeholm, Store Holm, Bukø, Kværnen, Eskilsø, Kuholm and Asholm.

== History ==
The town of Rudkøbing was granted market town rights in the 1200s, though struggled to compete with the numerous illegal trade ports around the island. During the Northern Wars in the middle of the 1600s, Rudkøbing was occupied by the Swedes. The occupation hurt the already struggling town, and the population dwindled. In the later parts of the 1700s the town began to recover, and during the industrialization the town and the island grew in population and activity. A new harbour was constructed in Rudkøbing in 1847, and the roads of the island were improved. Steamboat routes to Copenhagen, Svendborg and Ærø were established, and the population of Rudkøbing was tripled during the 1800s.

In the Middle Ages, when Denmark was divided into hundreds, Langeland was divided into two hundreds. These were Langeland's Northern Hundred (Danish: Langelands Nørre Herred) and Langeland's Southern Hundred (Danish: Langelands Sønder Herred), the latter also including the island of Siø. The island of Strynø was part of Sunds Hundred, which encompassed Svendborg and the town's surrounding area, as well as numerous islands in the South Funen Archipelago. The two hundreds on Langeland were part of the fief (Danish: len) of Tranekær Fief, which became Tranekær County in 1662. Sunds Hundred, with Strynø, meanwhile became a part of Nyborg County. In 1793 the two counties of Tranekær and Nyborg were merged to form Svendborg County, which was merged with Odense County in 1970 to form Funen County (Danish: Fyns Amt). This county was dissolved in 2007, and the entirety of Funen County became a part of the Region of Southern Denmark.

=== Historical divisions ===
The table below shows the historical municipal subdivisions of Langeland Municipality.

Historical municipal divisions of Langeland Municipality
2007	1970	1966	1842	1838	1200	Towns
Langeland Mun.	Rudkøbing Mun.	Rudkøbing Parish Mun.	Rudkøbing Market Town Mun.		Rudkøbing Market Town	Rudkøbing
Langeland Mun.	Rudkøbing Mun.	Rudkøbing Parish Mun.	Simmerbølle Parish Mun.			Simmerbølle
Langeland Mun.	Rudkøbing Mun.	Rudkøbing Parish Mun.	Skrøbelev Parish Mun.			Gammel Skrøbelev
Langeland Mun.	Rudkøbing Mun.	Rudkøbing Parish Mun.	Longelse-Fuglsbølle Parish Mun.			Spodsbjerg
Langeland Mun.	Rudkøbing Mun.	Rudkøbing Parish Mun.	Strynø Parish Mun.			Strynø By
Langeland Mun.	Sydlangeland Mun.	Sydlangeland Parish Mun.	Lindelse Parish Mun.			Lindelse
Langeland Mun.	Sydlangeland Mun.	Sydlangeland Parish Mun.	Humble Parish Mun.			Humble
Langeland Mun.	Sydlangeland Mun.	Sydlangeland Parish Mun.	Tryggelev-Fodslette Parish Mun.			Tryggelev
Langeland Mun.	Sydlangeland Mun.	Sydlangeland Parish Mun.	Magleby Parish Mun.			Bagenkop
Langeland Mun.	Tranekær Mun.	Tranekær Parish Mun.	Snøde-Stoense-Hov Parish Mun.			Lohals
Langeland Mun.	Tranekær Mun.	Tranekær Parish Mun.	Snøde-Stoense-Hov Parish Mun.			Snøde
Langeland Mun.	Tranekær Mun.	Tranekær Parish Mun.	Bøstrup Parish Mun.			Bøstrup
Langeland Mun.	Tranekær Mun.	Tranekær Parish Mun.	Tranekær-Tullebølle Parish Mun.			Tullebølle

== Towns ==
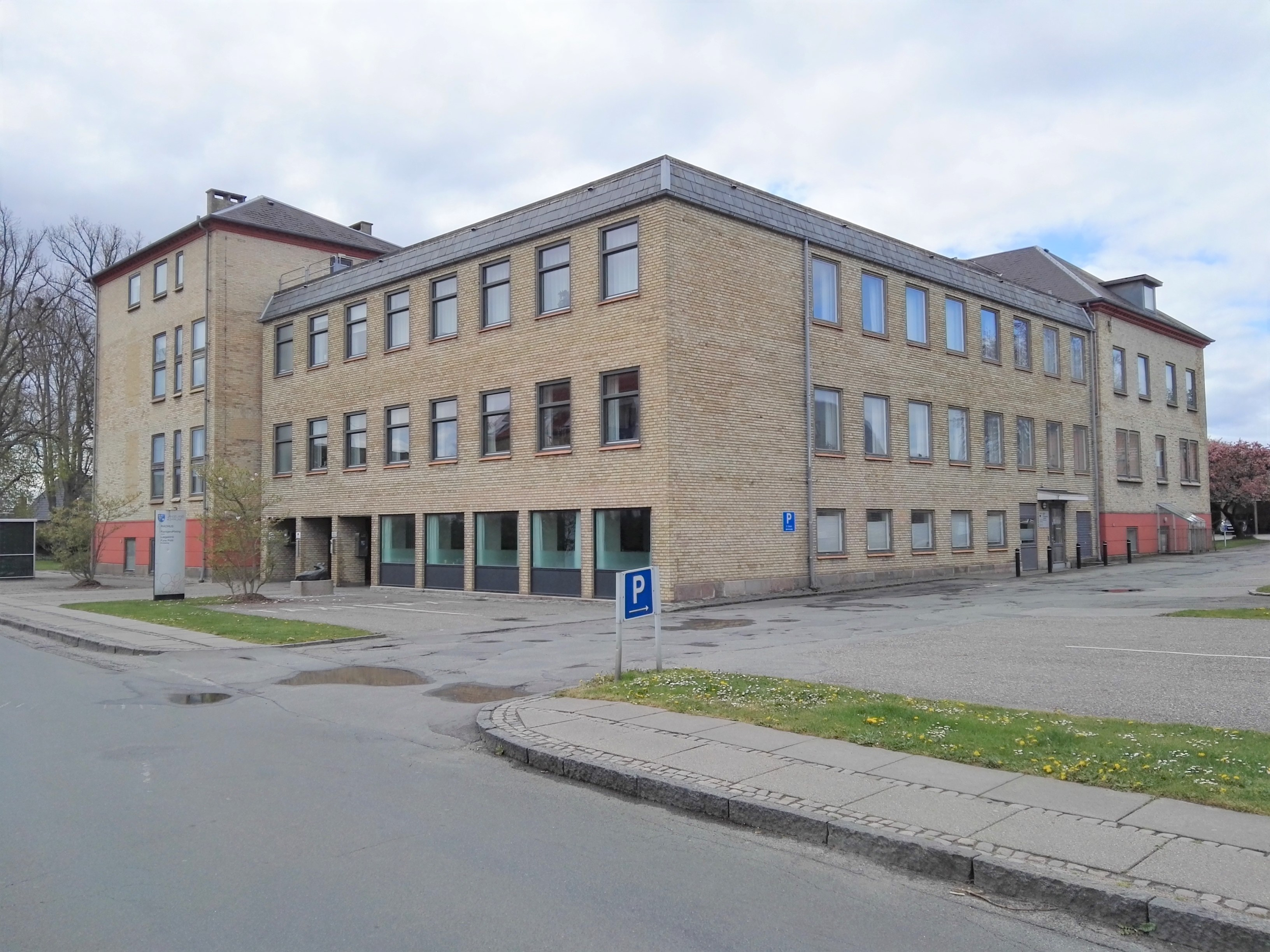
Langeland Municipality's city hall in Rudkøbing

Below are all settlements in the municipality with populations of at least 200 people (populations as of 2020).

Rudkøbing	4,565
Tullebølle	784
Humble	639
Bagenkop	456

Lohals	446
Lindelse	307
Snøde	288
Spodsbjerg	214

=== Rudkøbing ===
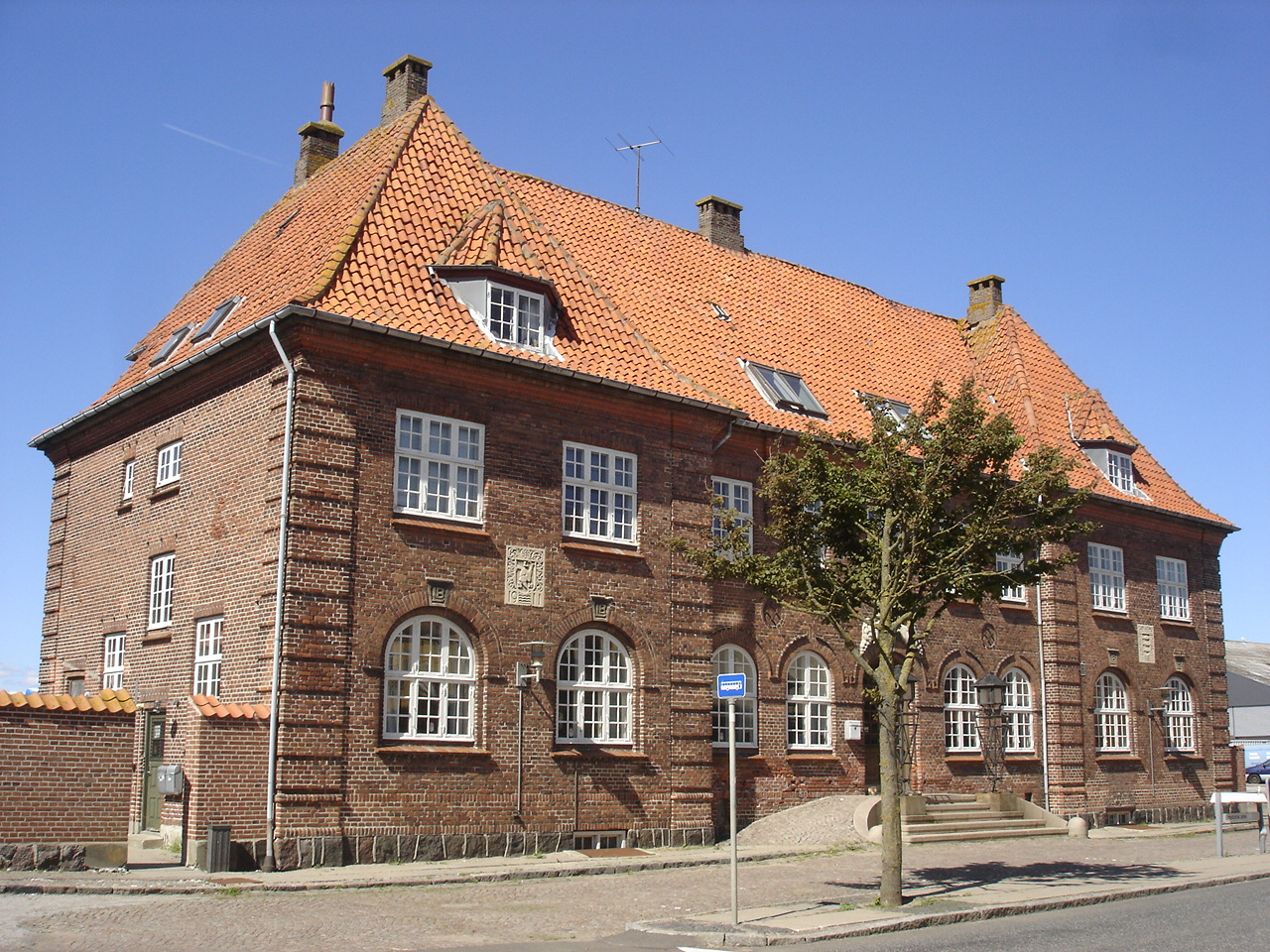
Former train station in Rudkøbing

Rudkøbing is located centrally on the island, and thus also the municipality. It is connected to Siø through the Langeland Bridge. South of the bridge, along the island's coast, is Rudkøbing Harbour. Along the harbour are numerous facilities. The southern and central parts of the town consist mainly of residential areas, while the eastern part of the town is home to a sizable industrial area.

South of Rudkøbing is Rudkøbing Forest, which covers approximately 3 acres.

=== Villages ===
There is only one settlement on the islands of Strynø: Strynø By. This village is located centrally on the island, and houses the island's attractions and facilities. It connects to the ferry harbour through a short road. In Strynø By is Strynø Church.

East of the settlement of Søndenbro is the Langeland Fort (Danish: Langelandsfortet), a cold war museum and bunker.

In Tranekær is a botanical garden known as the Medicinal Gardens in Tranekær (Danish: Medicinhaverne i Tranekær). These gardens include herbs and plants, historically used for medicinal purposes. Also located in Tranekær is Tranekær Castle, a castle from the 1200s. The castle is fortified with moats and fortifications. The castle provide guided tours and most services provided by manor houses.

From Spodsbjerg is a ferry connection to Tårs on Lolland.

In addition to these villages, there are a number of smaller settlements in the municipality. These are all the settlements with populations of less than 200 people:

Assemose
Bammeskov
Barager
Bastemose
Bedehaver
Blandebjerg
Blangshave
Bogø
Botofte
Brandsby
Broholm
Bukkemose
Bøsseløkke
Bøstrup
Dageløkke
Emmerbølle
Ennebølle
Estre Huse
Fakkemose

Fodslette
Fredmose
Fredskoven
Frellesvig
Fuglsbølle
Fuglsbølle Sønderskov
Fåbæk
Gammel Skrøbelev
Gulstav
Hannebjerg Huse
Harnbjerg
Harsmark
Havbølle
Havbølle Mose
Heden
Helletofte
Helleved
Helsned
Helsned Møllevænge

Hennetved
Henninge
Herslev
Hesselbjerg
Hestehave
Hou
Hovgårde
Humble Kohave
Humble Ålemose
Hylletofte
Illebølle
Jydevænge
Karskov Huse
Kassebølle
Keldsnor
Kinderballe
Klavsebølle
Klæsø
Kokkestræde

Korsebølle Kohave
Kragholm
Kragholm Huse
Krogsbjerg
Kumlehøje
Kurvemose
Kædeby
Kædeby Haver
Kædebybro
Kædebyhas
Lejbølle
Lismose
Longelse Sønderskov
Lungehave
Løkkeby
Magleby
Mileskov
Munkegårde
Møllemose Huse

Nordenbro
Nordenbro Vesteregn
Ny Skrøbelev
Nyby
Nygårds Hjørne
Næbbehuse
Næstebølle
Nørre Longelse
Nørreballe
Ore
Ormstrup
Pederstrup
Polleskov Huse
Præstemarken
Pusseløkke
Påø
Rat
Ravneryd
Renehuse

Rifbjerg
Ristinge
Ristinge Hale
Rødby
Rørsløkke
Sandet
Simmerbølle
Skattebølle
Skebjerg
Skovhave
Skovhuse
Skræddervænget
Sletø
Slåvænget
Snaremose
Snøde Hesselbjerg
Stat-ene
Stat-harstræde
Stengade

Strandby
Strandhuse
Strynø By
Strynø Kalv
Svalebølle
Sædballe
Søndenbro
Sønder Longelse
Sønderbro Østeregn
Torpe
Tranekær
Tressebølle
Troldebjerg Gårde
Tryggelev
Tvillinghuse
Tøvelsø Huse
Uglebjerg
Vesterby
Vesterhuse

Viehusene
Vindeby
Vindeltorp
Vinkælderhuse
Vognsbjerg
Øen
Ørkenbjerg
Østerby
Østerhuse
Østerskov
Østrig
Åsø

== Nature ==
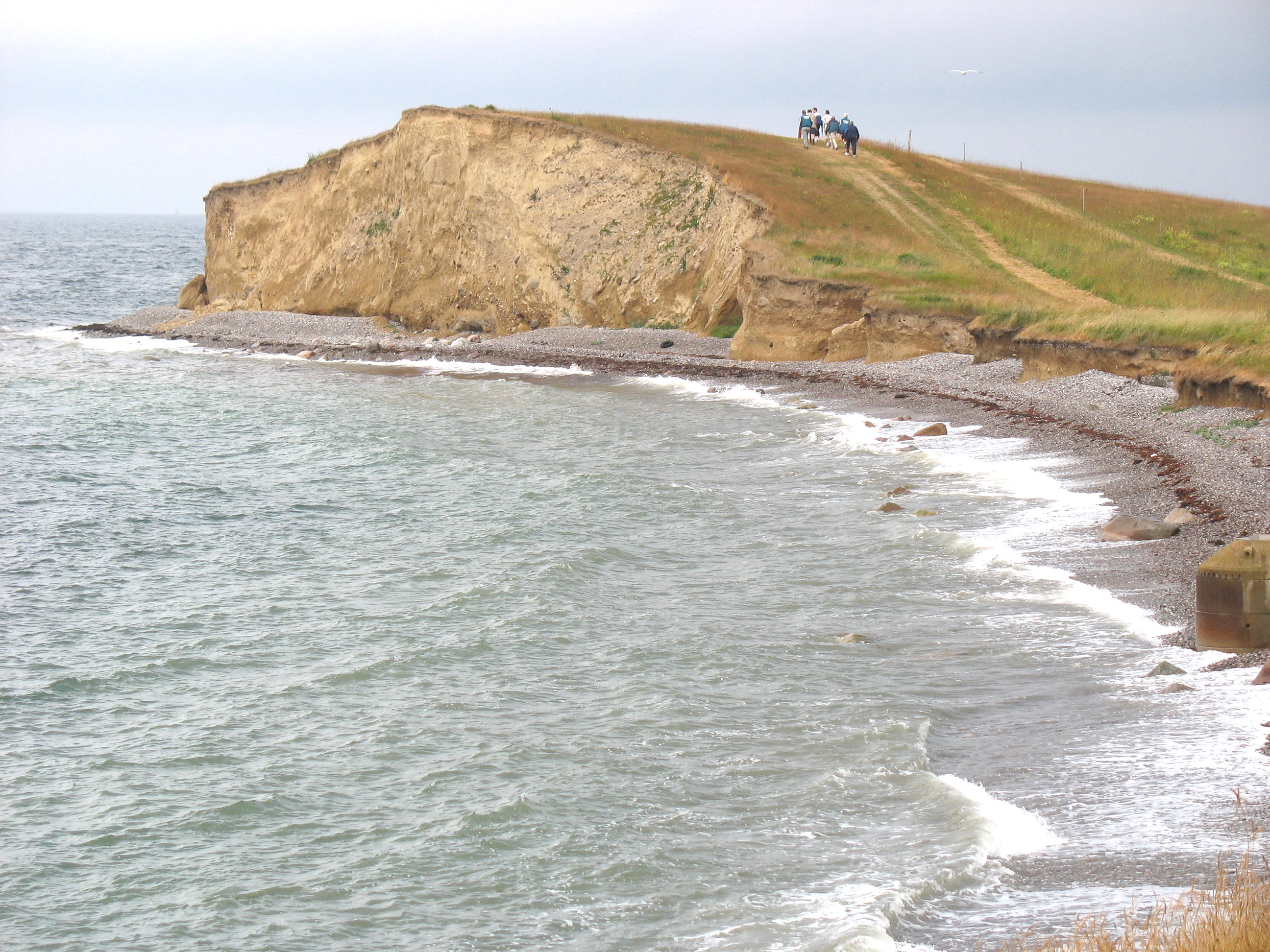
Gulstav Klint

The southernmost tip of Langeland has been protected since 1961. 25 acres are protected. Exmoor ponies have been released in the area, left on their own as wild horses and only fed in emergencies. Plants in the area include the common toothwort and stemless thistle. Breeding birds in the area include water rail, waterhen, little grebe and red-backed shrike.

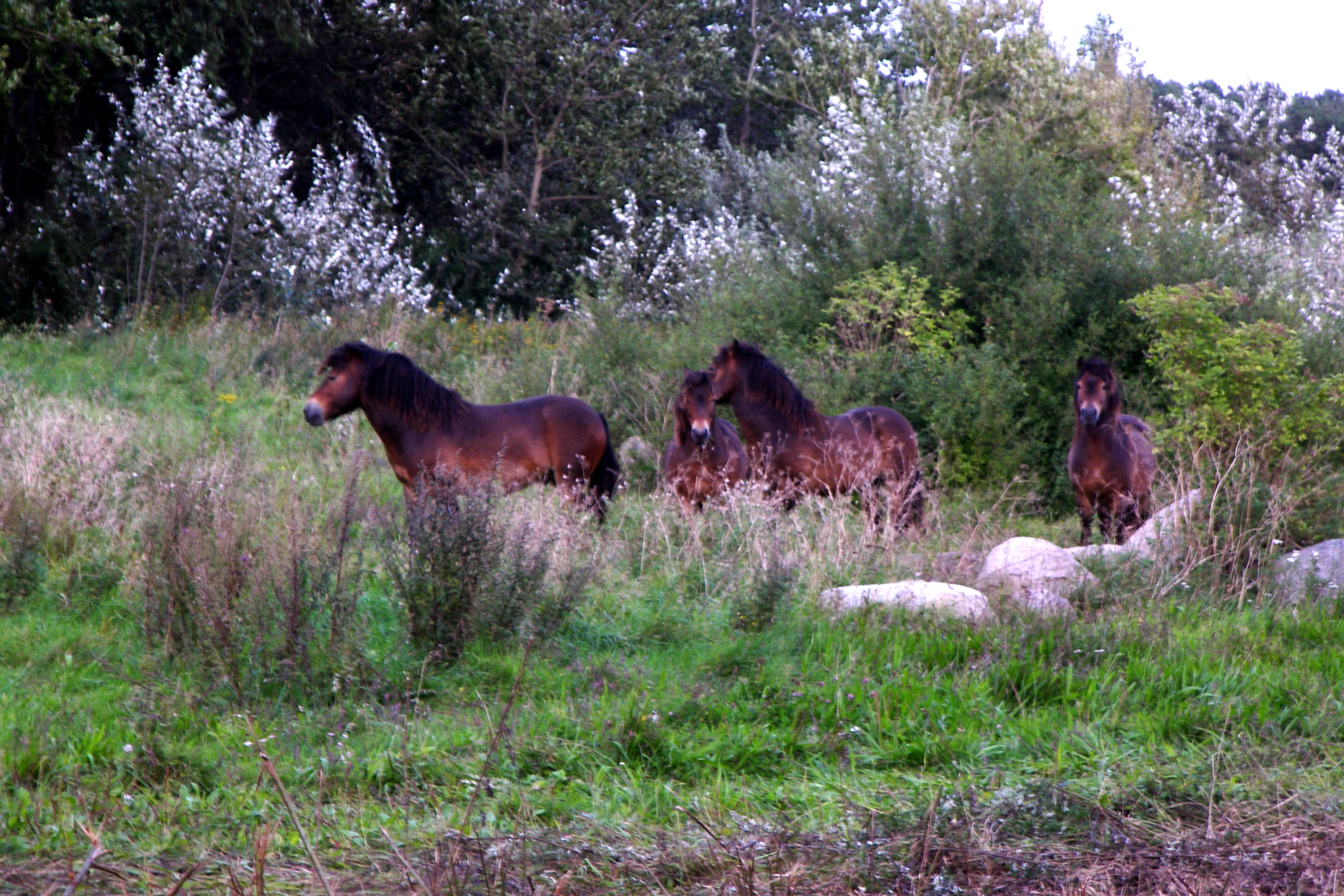
Wild horses on Langeland

65 acres of bog west of Fredmose has been protected since 1981. The bog is known as Sædballe Fredmose, named after the two settlements surrounding it, with Sædballe to the west and Fredmose to the east. It is rich in bird activity, and the nightingale can be found breeding in the bog.

South of Nyby and Hesselbjerg is an area of bogs, lakes and coast known as Tryggelev Nor. 122 acres of it has been protected since 1987, in order to protect the birds of the area. Also protected is 10.5 acres of forest, known as Næs Skov, directly adjacent to Tryggelev Nor. Around 70 species are known to breed in the area, including reed warbler, marsh warbler, bearded reedling and nightingale. Birds of prey in the area include the marsh harrier.

Cliffs and beaches around Ristinge are home to a number of rare beetles and butterflies. Found here are a vulnerable oil beetle, and it is also the only place in Scandinavia to have a registered sighting of the tawny mining bee.

Longelse Farmer's Forest (Danish: Longelse Bondegårdsskov) is a forest located southwest of Nørre Longelse. 8.5 acres of the forest is protected and the forest is left untouched with little human interference. Despite the forest's small size of around 85,000 m^{2} it is the most diverse in species on Langeland. It is home to several types of windflowers and other plants, as well as a series of different types of trees. Being left untouched, the forest is also home to breeding birds that enjoy the rotting wood from dead trees. These include the stock dove and brown owl. The forest is also home to both the roe deer and fallow deer.

Also protected are a large number of dykes around the island. These have been protected since 1959. Also protected in the municipality is 4.6 acres of coast north of Bagenkop, protected since 1966, as well as 385 acres of the manor of Skovsgaard, protected since 1973. Another manor with protected area is Tranekær Castle (Danish: Tranekær Slot). 65 acres of Tranekær Castle's area is protected. 6 acres around a passage grave west of Tullebølle is also protected, having been protected in 1959.

=== Lindelse Nor ===
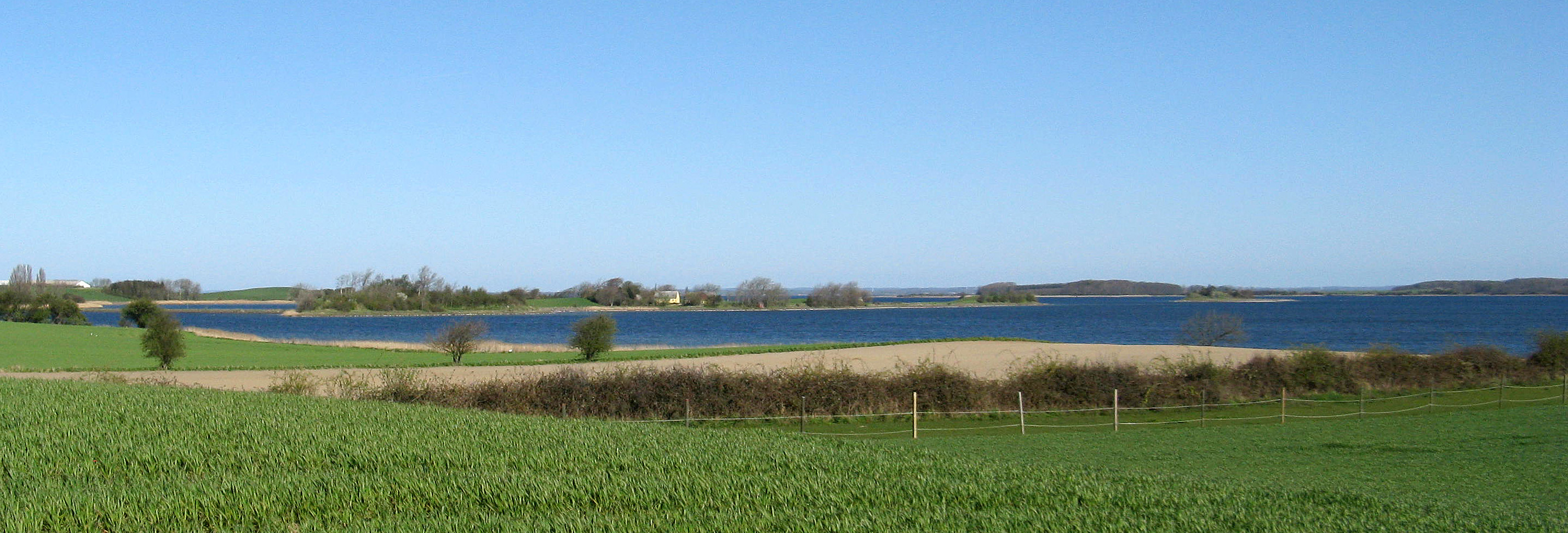
Lindelse Nor

Lindelse Nor is a narrow bay located approximately 5 km south of Rudkøbing. The bay contains flooded sites from the stone Stone and Iron Ages. Information signs has been placed along an underwater trail, allowing divers to experience these sites and the underwater landscape.

There are a number of islands in Lindelse Nor. Of these, Lindø and Langø are inhabited. Both are connected to Langeland through a dam. The remaining islands are part of the South Funen Archipelago Nature Reserve (Danish: Sydfynske Øhav Vildtreservat). This means that the islands in Lindelse Nor, with the exception of the two inhabited islands, may not be visited from March to July. Birds known to breed in Lindelse Nor and on the islands include red-breasted merganser, northern lapwing, Eurasian oystercatcher and Mute swan.

=== Strynø ===
The area on Strynø is mostly used for agriculture, with only a small number of untouched nature areas. Approximately 190 people live on the island.

Breeding birds on Strynø include starling, Eurasian skylark, European goldfinch, eider and blackbird.

=== Strynø Kalv ===
Strynø Kalv is located west of Strynø, and is privately owned. It was previously inhabited, but is today uninhabited. Nature on the island is mostly left untouched since the 1960s, where the island was used to ship out agricultural products. Today only some animal grazing disrupts the nature. Plants on the island include caspia, pepperwort and sea aster.

3 acres around a small lake on the island is protected. This was done to protect the European fire-bellied toad, which used to be common in the South Funen Archipelago, but is today rare. It was protected in 1951.

== Politics ==
Langeland's municipal council consists of 15 members, elected every four years. The municipal council has six political committees.

=== Municipal council ===
Below are the municipal councils elected since the Municipal Reform of 2007.

Election	Party								Total seats	Turnout	Elected mayor
Election	A	B	C	F	O	T	V	Ø	Total seats	Turnout	Elected mayor
2005	5			2	1	12	5		25	76.0%	Knud Gether (T)
2009	3	1	1	1	1	5	3		15	72.4%	Bjarne Nielsen (V)
2013	2				2	4	5	2	15	77.3%	Bjarne Nielsen (V)
2017	3		1	6	1		4		15	75.2%	Tonni Hansen (F)
Data from Kmdvalg.dk and Statistikbanken.dk

=== Mayors ===
Since the 2007 municipal reform, the mayors of Langeland Municipality have been:

#	Mayor	Party	Term
1	Knud Gether	Local party	2007–2010
2	Bjarne Nielsen	Venstre	2010–2018
3	Tonni Hansen	Socialist People's Party	2018-

== Economy ==
The largest industries in Langeland Municipality are social institutions, retail and agriculture.

Large companies in the municipality include Ø Pølser, whose sausages are named after the island of Langeland. GEVEKO, who manufacture road markers, have their headquarters in Sønder Longelse.

== Demographics ==
Historical population
Year	Pop.	±%
2007	13,937	—
2008	13,741	−1.4%
2009	13,563	−1.3%
2010	13,510	−0.4%
2011	13,322	−1.4%
2012	13,094	−1.7%
2013	12,861	−1.8%
2014	12,695	−1.3%
2015	12,647	−0.4%
2016	12,547	−0.8%
2017	12,578	+0.2%
2018	12,641	+0.5%
2019	12,560	−0.6%
2020	12,491	−0.5%
2021	12,367	−1.0%
Source: Statistikbanken.dk

There are 12,491 people living in Langeland Municipality (2020). 49.44% are women and 50.56% are men.

Below is the age distribution of the municipality.

Age
1. 0-5 (3.58%)
2. 6-17 (10.1%)
3. 18-35 (13.3%)
4. 36-64 (38.5%)
5. 64+ (34.6%)

== Education ==
The municipality has 3 ground schools (Nordskolen, Humble Skole and Ørstedskolen), 3 efterskoler (Langeland Efterskole, Musik Efterskolen i Humble and Magleby Efterskole), and 1 independent school (Kassebølle Friskole).

There is also a municipal school that goes up to 4th grade on the island of Strynø and a full-day school that goes up to 7th grade in Skrøbelev, both of which belong to Ørstedskolen.

There is 1 library in the municipality, in Rudkøbing. Associated with the library is a car (the "Book Car" – Danish: Bogbilen) that brings books to eight different towns across the municipality, including Strynø.

== Transport ==
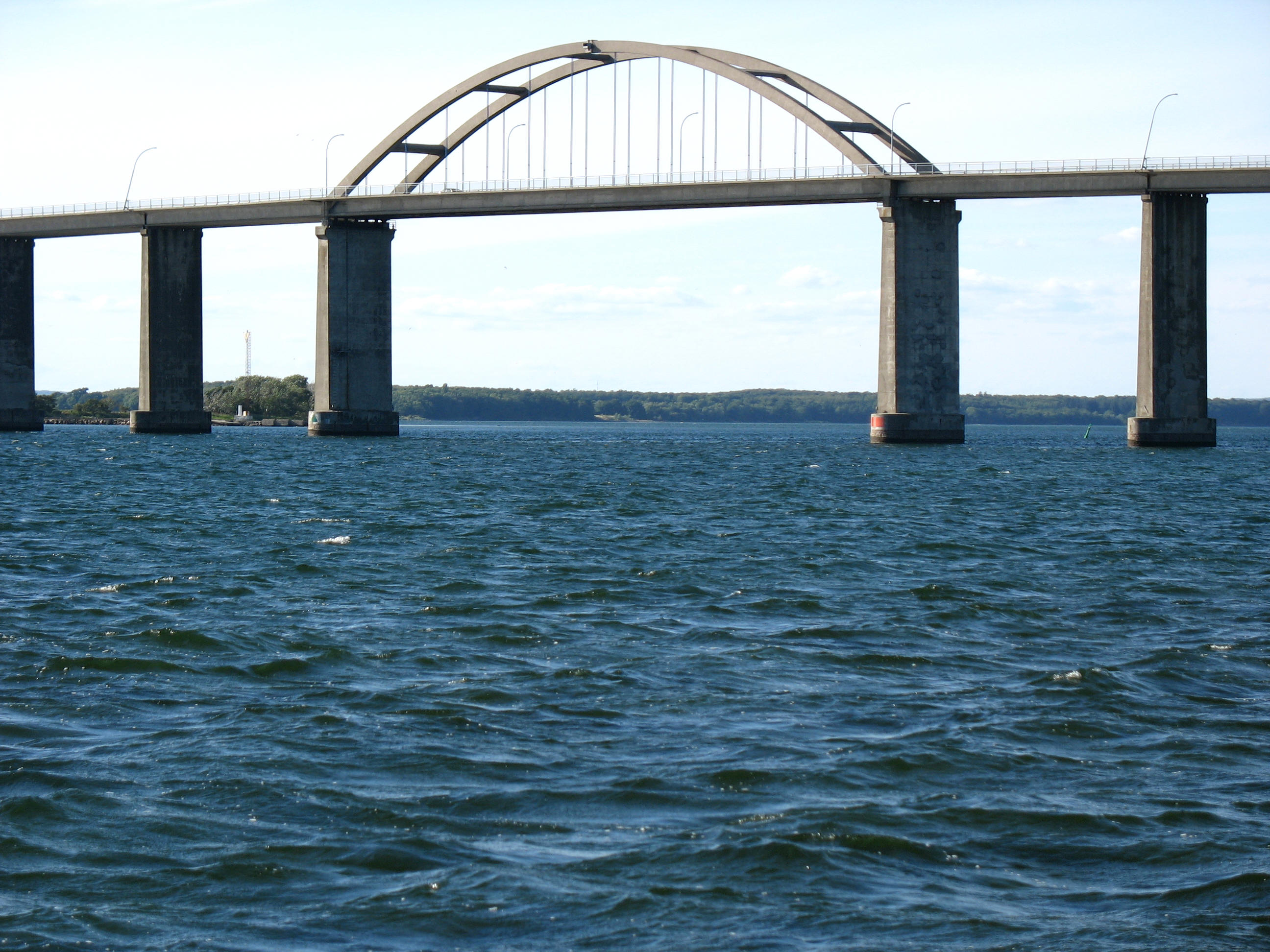
The Langeland Bridge

Langeland and the municipality is connected to mainland Funen through a series of bridges. From Svendborg the Svendborgsund Bridge connects Funen to Tåsinge. From Tåsinge the Siøsund Bridge connects to Siø. The Siøsund Bridge is 558 meters long. It was built between 1957–1960 and opened on 22 October 1960. From Siø the Langeland Bridge connects to Langeland. The Langeland Bridge is 774 meters long. It was built between 1960–1962 and opened on 10 November 1962. The bridge was created by Anker Engelund.

There are three ferry routes in the municipality. Within the municipality the island of Strynø connects to Langeland through the Strynø Ferry, which docks at Rudkøbing. The trip takes approximately 30 minutes. Another ferry connects Spodsbjerg with Tårs in Lolland Municipality. The trip, called the Langeland Line (Danish: Langelandslinjen) takes 45 minutes. From Rudkøbing a ferry connects to Marstal in Ærø Municipality. The ferry, ÆrøXpressen, was built in 2020. The trip from Rudkøbing to Marstal takes 50 minutes.

== Sights ==
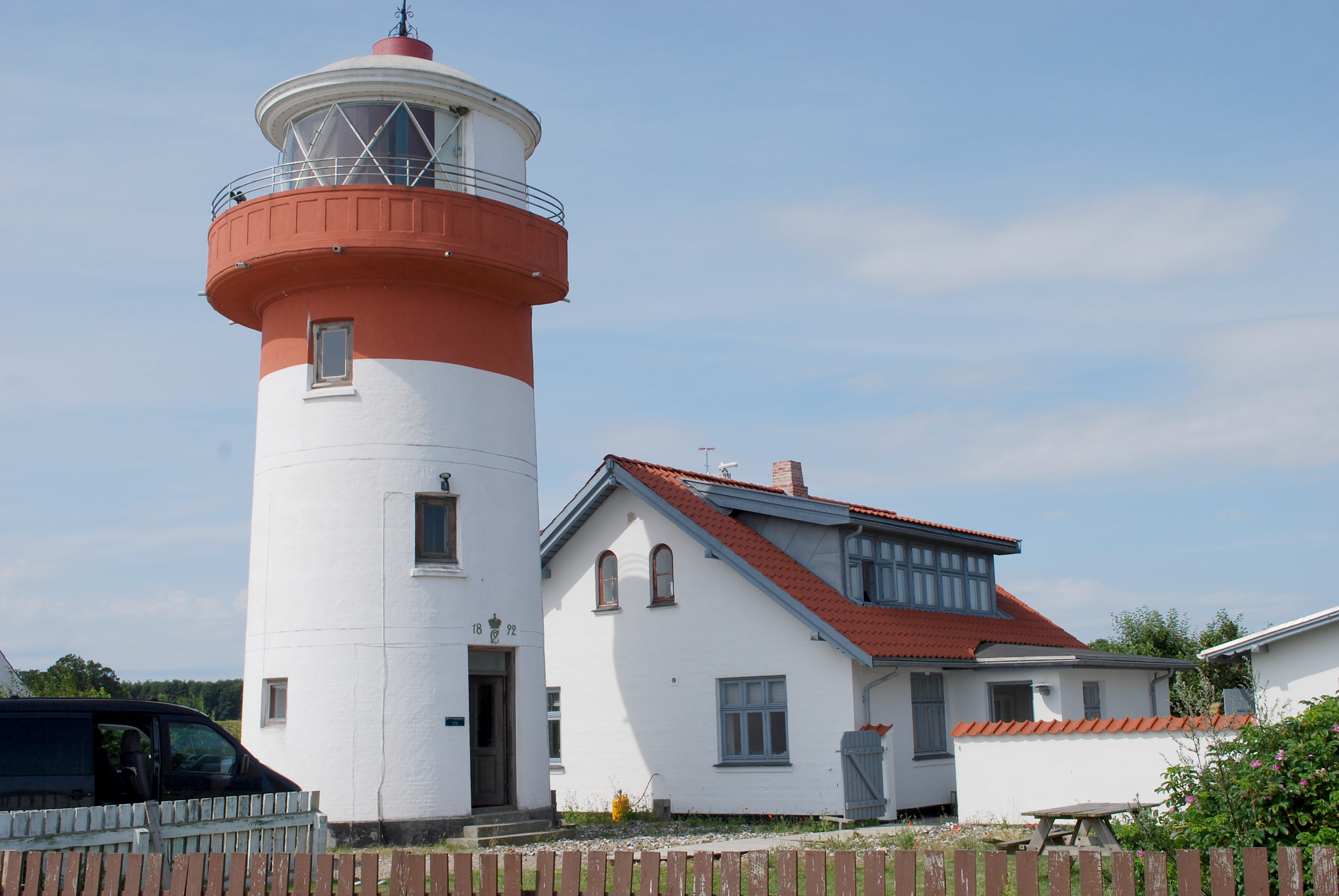
Hou Lighthouse

The islands of Langeland and Strynø are popular tourist destinations, and as a result there are numerous museums and attractions on the islands.

- The Medicinal Gardens in Tranekær (Danish: Medicinhaverne i Tranekær) are located in Tranekær. These gardens include herbs and plants, historically used for medicinal purposes.
- Strynø Mill (Danish: Strynø Mølle) is a windmill located on Strynø. It was built in 1832 by Mads Jørgensen.
- Hou Lighthouse (Danish: Hou Fyr) is a lighthouse located on northern Langeland. It was built in 1892 and first lighted in December 1893.
- The Hulbjerg Passage Grave (Danish: Hulbjerg Jættestue) is a passage grave located south of Bagenkop. It is eight meters long and dates back to 3300–3200 BCE. The findings from the passage grave are displayed on Langeland's Museum. The passage grave was protected in 1966.

=== Museums ===
- Langeland's Museum (Danish: Langelands Museum) is located in Rudkøbing. It was founded by Jens Winther in 1900. It began with archeological findings from Langeland, which is still part of the museum, but today items about cultural history are also displayed.
- Souvenariet (Danish: Souvenirmuseum Souvenariet) is a museum with focus on souvenirs. It is located in Tranekær.
- The Archipelago's Smack and Nature Center (Danish: Øhavets Smakke- og Naturcenters) is a museum located on Strynø. It informs about the South Funen Archipelago's cultural and natural history, and also displays several types of boats, namely smacks. The museum has existed since 1993.
- The Fishery House (Danish: Fiskeriets Hus) is a local museum located in Bagenkop. It focuses on the local history, as well as on fishery.
- The Tranekær Castle Mill (Danish: Tranekær Slotsmølle) is a windmill from 1846. It has been turned into a museum, with focus on the mill's history.

==== Langeland Fort ====
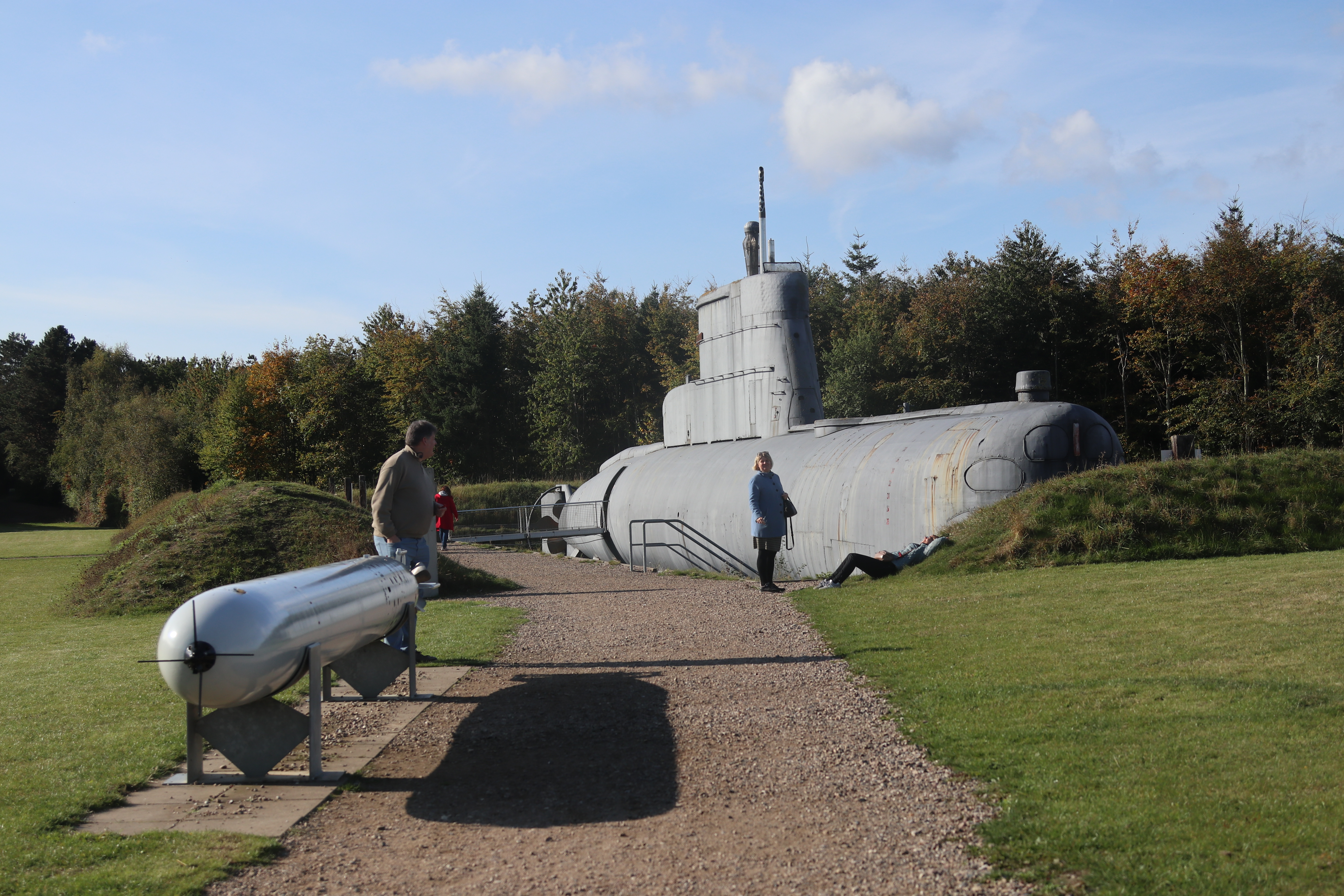
Submarine at the Langeland Fort

The Langeland Fort (Danish: Langelandsfortet) is a Cold War bunker. It was built by the Royal Danish Navy in 1952–54 and consisted of 14 different underground bunkers. It was built on the east coast on southern Langeland, and equipped with cannons and batteries to defend the Great Belt, as well as protect the minefields that the Royal Danish Navy would place. The bunker also included anti-air weapons, meant to protect the local radar stations of the Navy and Air Force. The bunker's crew consisted of up to 400 marines, who lived at a nearby barrack. The Langeland Fort was from 1961 to 1986 the seat for the Langeland Marine District (Danish: Langelands Marinedistrikt).

In 1973 the bunker's anti-air weapons and main battery were preserved and in April 1993 the bunker was shut down. It opened as a museum in June 1997, named the Cold War Museum Langeland Fort (Danish: Koldkrigsmuseum Langelandsfort). The museum displays a submarine, minesweeper, Saab 35 Draken fighter aircraft and MiG-23 fighter aircraft. The museum also has exhibits on the Frogman Corps and Cold War espionage.

=== Castles and manors ===
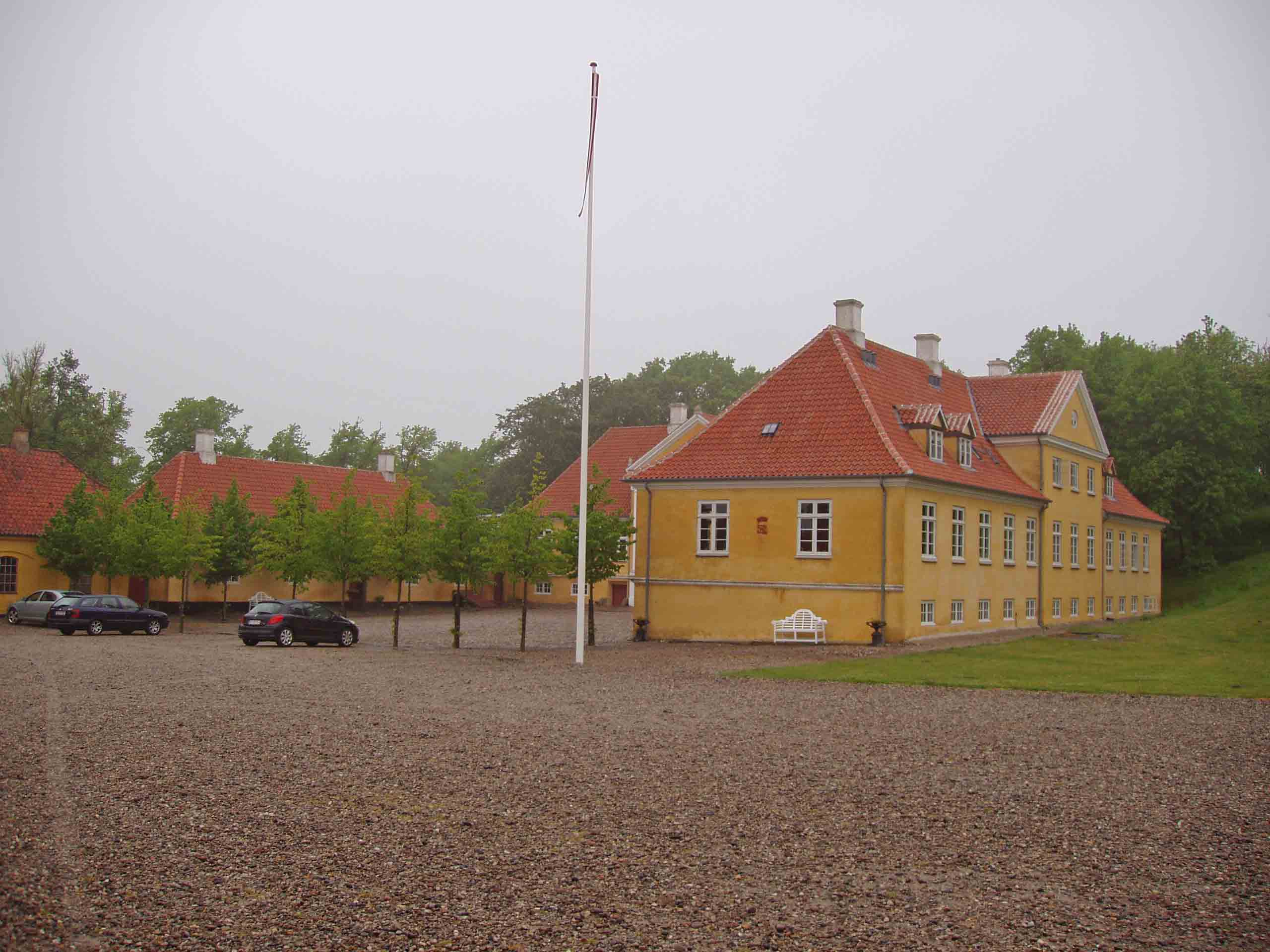
Broløkke

- Biskopstorp is a manor located southwest of Tullebølle. Biskopstorp used to be a village, with the manor having existed since at least 1740, though it likely originates from much earlier. The current main building is from 1727.
- Broløkke is a manor located southeast of Magleby. The oldest part of the current manor was built in 1758, though the manor originates from the 1500s where it was called Brobjerg. It was owned by the crown until 1577 where Anne Lunge obtained ownership of the manor. Her son sold it, and around 1640 it was owned by the Mylting-family. It was likely this family that changed the manor's name to Broløkke. It was eventually bought by the Lauritsen-family and in 1743 the Ahlefeldt-family, who sold the manor to pastor Dines Christian Krag. It returned to the Ahlefeldt-family after the pastor's death, however, and remained in the family until 2004 where it was bought by Niels Palmqvist.
- Egeløkke is a manor located west of Bøstrup. It has existed since the Middle Ages. The current main building is from 1845.

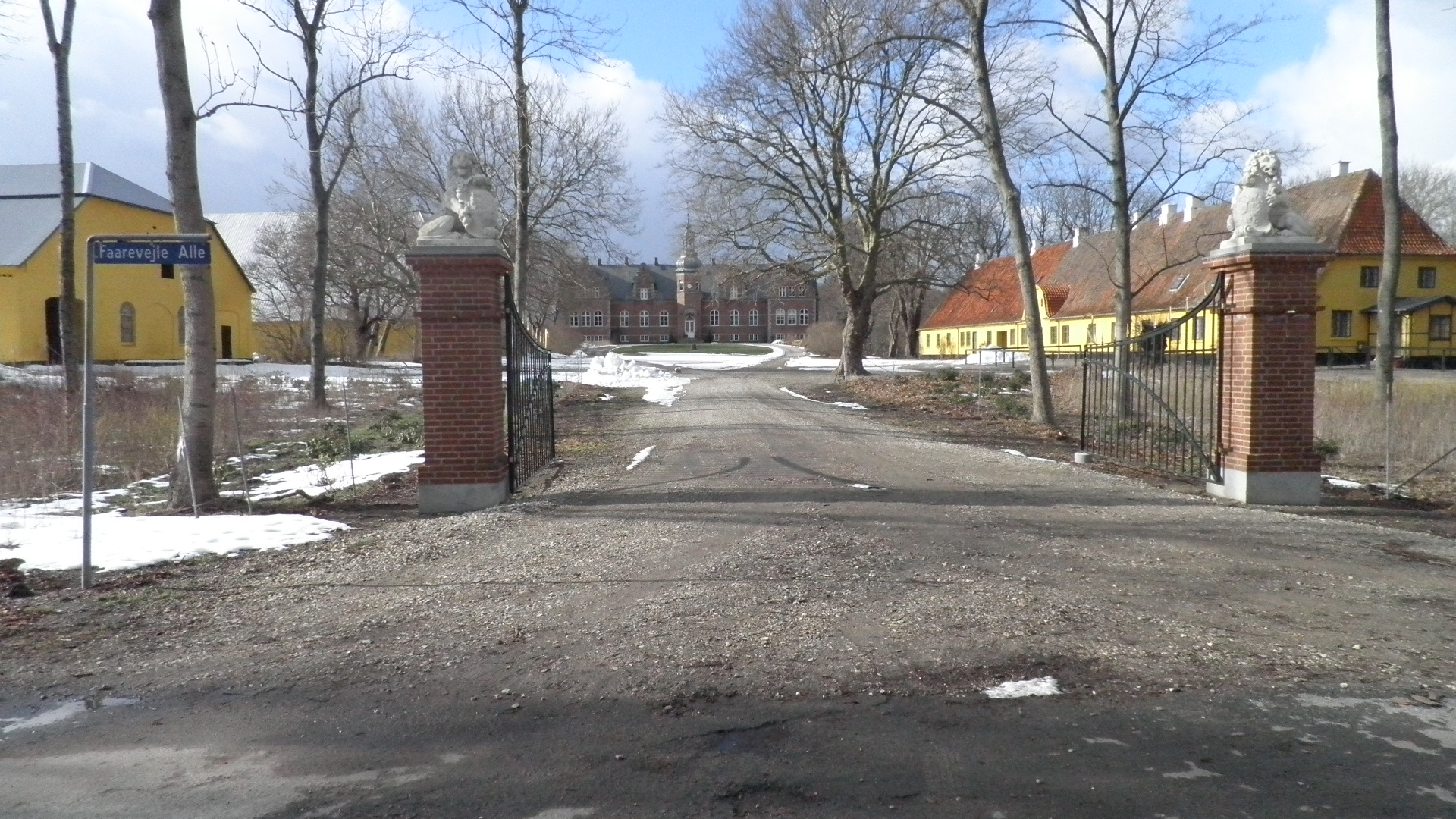
Faarevejle

- Faarevejle is a manor located south of Rudkøbing. It has existed since the 1300s, though the current main building is from the 1870s and built by architect A. H. Klein.
- Hjortholm is a manor located northeast of Fodslette. The manor has existed since the start of the 1500s, where it was known as Fodslettegaard and located within the village of Fodslette. Melchior Hvas, who owned the manor between 1575 and 1602, moved the manor out of the village and was likely also the one to rename it to Hjortholm. The manor has been in the Ahlefeldt-Laurvig-family since 1896.
- Holmegaard is a manor located south of Søndenbro. It was first mentioned in 1500. From 1952 to 2008 it was owned by the Ministry of Defense and used for training of military personnel.
- Korsebølle is a manor located north of Tranekær. Korsebølle used to be a village. It was founded as a manor in 1718–1719 by count Carl Ahlefeldt. The Ahlefeldt-Laurvig-family has been the owners of Korsebølle since the manor's foundation in 1718.

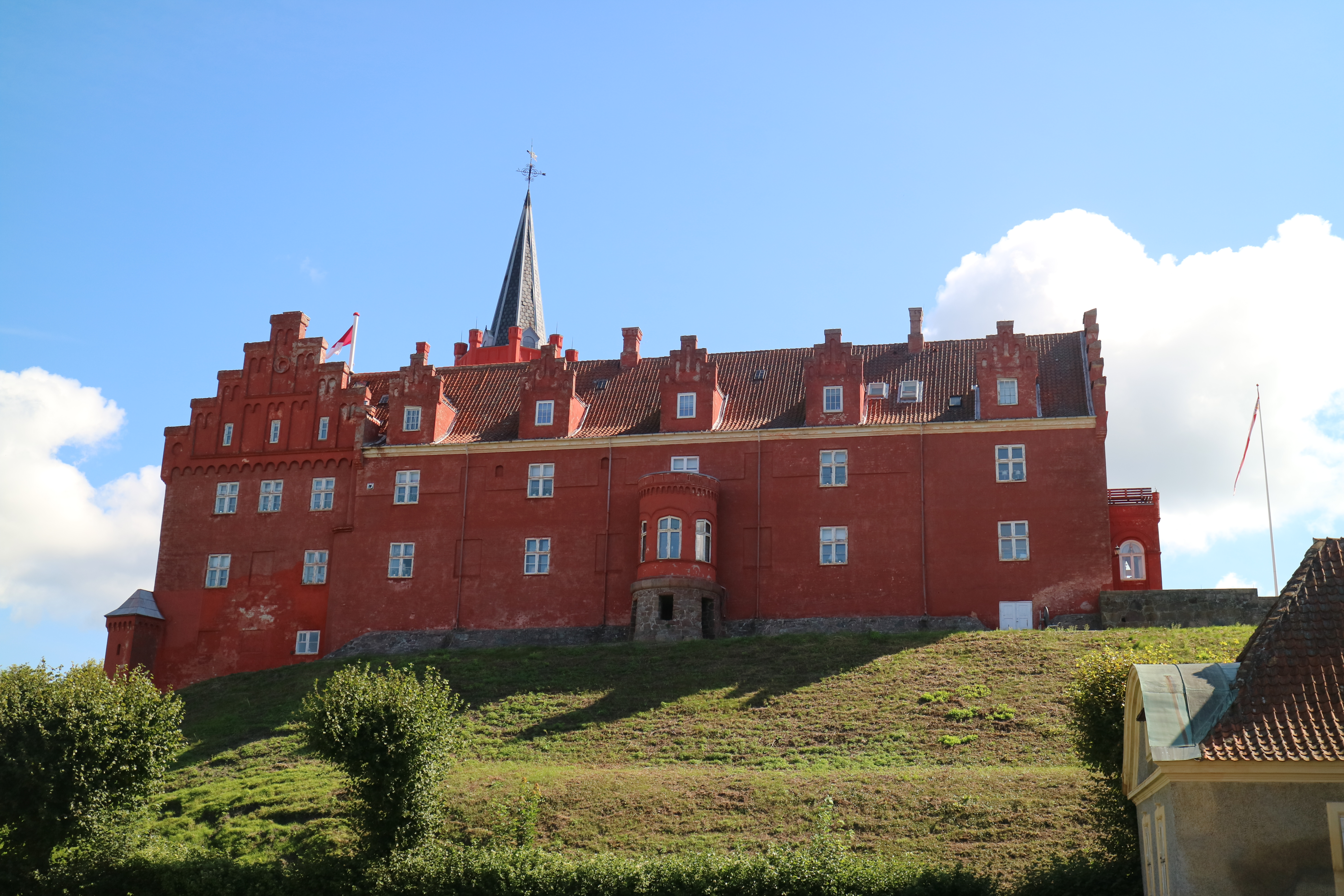
Tranekær Castle

- Lykkesholm is a manor located in Tryggelev. The manor is known to have existed from the 1400s.
- Møllegaard is a manor located southwest of Spodsbjerg. It has existed since the 1500s, where it was owned by Oluf Hansen Gaas and later Mogens Eriksen Bille. The Bille-family kept the manor until 1614, where it was acquired by Bendt Petersen von Deden. It remained in this family until 1704, and from then on switched hands between families several times. It has since 2016 been owned by a company called Møllegård Hovedgaard K/S. The manor's main building is from 1880.
- Nedergaard is a manor located south of Snøde. It has existed since at least 1409.
- Skovsbo is a manor located south of Sønder Longelse. It is known to have existed since at least 1464. In the Middle Ages there were large forest areas around the area of Skovsbo. The manor's main building is from around 1830.
- Skovsgaard is a manor located east of Hennetved. It is known to have existed since at least 1457.
- Steensgaard is a manor located southeast of Lohals. It has existed since at least 1442.
- Tranekær is a manor and castle located in Tranekær. It has existed since the 1200s, where its ownership switched between the crown and the dukes of South Jutland. It was given to Christian Rantzau in 1645, who gave the manor to his son-in-law, Frederik Ahlefeldt in 1659. The manor has remained in the Ahlefeldt-Laurvig-family since then.
- Vestergaard is a manor located southwest of Lindelse. It has existed since the 1500s. The current main building of the manor was built in 1892.

=== Churches ===
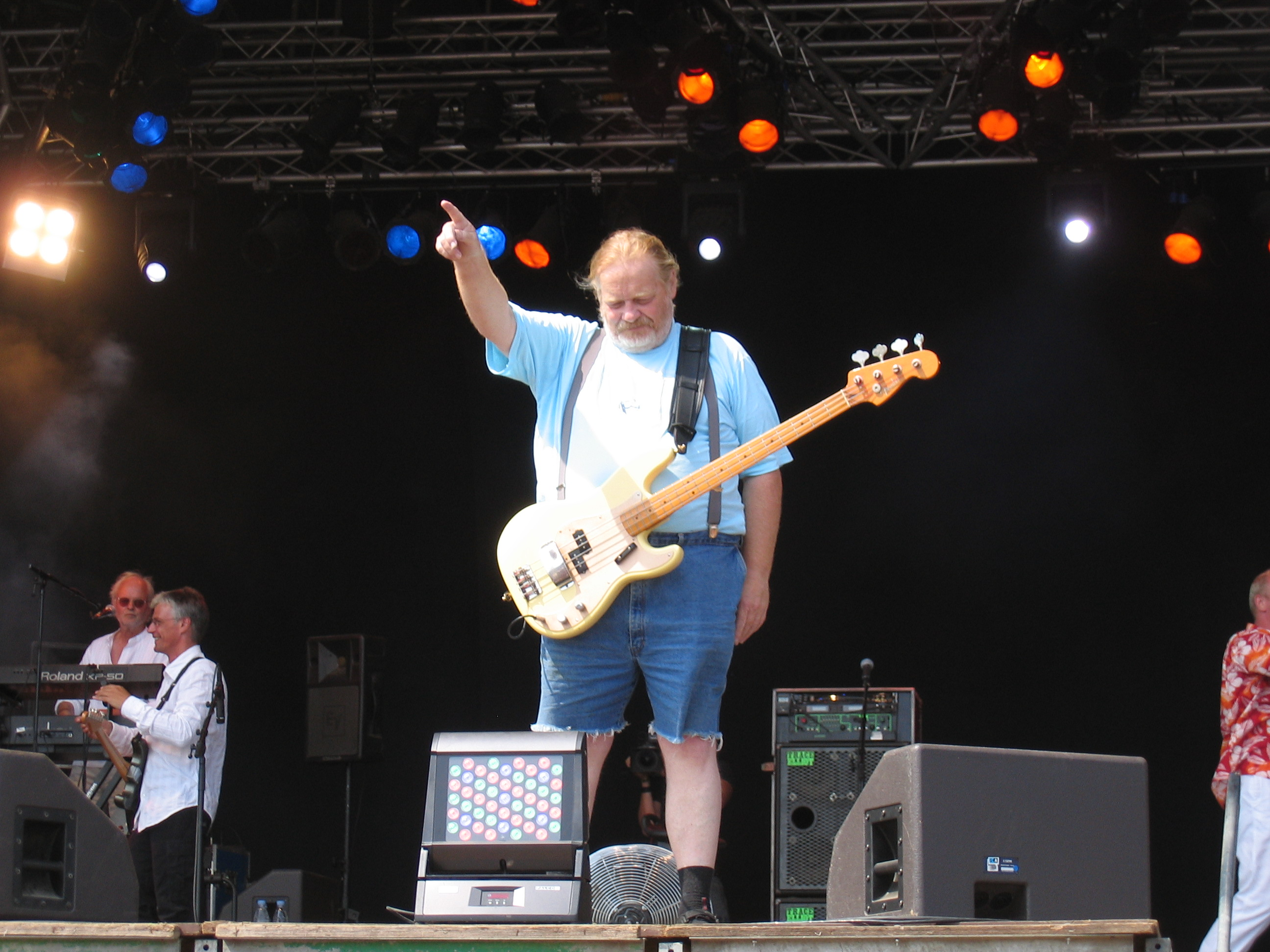
Flemming Jørgensen at the Langeland Festival in 2006

See List of churches in Langeland Municipality

=== Events ===
The Archipelago Day (Danish: Øhavets Dag) takes place in Ristinge on the last Sunday in August. It takes place on the harbour, and includes several activities related to agricultural shows.

In Lohals is a yearly festival dedicated to the frikadelle. Besides activities related to the frikadelle, there is also live music.

==== Langelandsfestival ====
The Langelandsfestival (Danish: Langelandsfestival) is a yearly music festival, set south of Rudkøbing. It takes place on Week 30 and gets around 25,000-30,000 visitors. The festival first began in 1991.

== Parishes ==
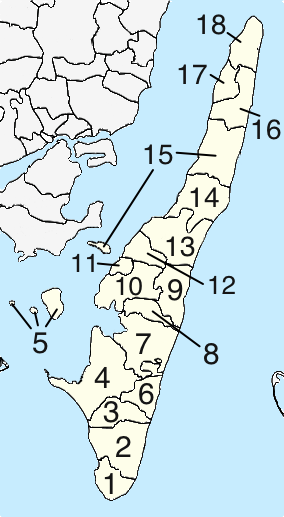
Parishes of Langeland Municipality.

There are 18 parishes in Langeland Municipality. Shown in the table below are the populations of each parish, as well as the percentage of that population that are members of the Church of Denmark. All numbers are from 1 January 2020.

#	Parish	Population	%	Source
1	Bagenkop	530	93.96	
2	Magleby	368	85.60	
3	Tryggelev	334	84.73	
4	Humble	1,307	85.77	
5	Strynø	197	62.94	
6	Fodslette	92	75.00	
7	Lindelse	733	86.22	
8	Fuglsbølle	187	87.70	
9	Longelse	575	84.17	
10	Skrøbelev	644	85.71	
11	Rudkøbing	4,014	79.97	
12	Simmerbølle	722	83.52	
13	Tullebølle	1,099	84.53	
14	Tranekær	191	78.01	
15	Bøstrup	425	80.24	
16	Snøde	337	82.49	
17	Stoense	187	82.89	
18	Hou	535	82.62	

== Symbols ==
Langeland Municipality's coat of arms

The coat of arms of Langeland Municipality is a white rose branch in the blue ocean, which is how the island of Langeland was described by Adam Oehlenschläger. The coat of arms was created by Ronny Andersen in 2006.

== Notable residents ==
=== Public thought ===
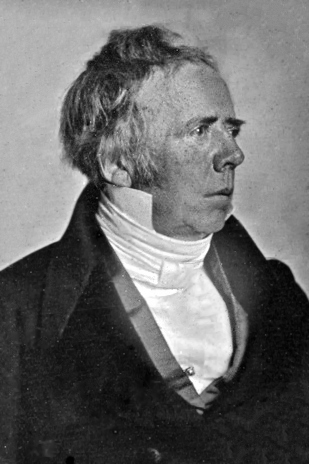
Hans Christian Ørsted

- Erik Bredal (born 1608 in Rudkøbing — 1672), bishop
- Otto Fabricius (born 1744 in Rudkøbing — 1822), missionary and explorer
- Hans Egede Saabye (born 1746 on Strynø — 1817), priest and missionary in Greenland
- Hans Christian Ørsted (born 1777 in Rudkøbing — 1851), physicist and chemist
- Jørgen Ernst Meyer (born 1802 near Hou — 1873), industrialist
- Mads Johansen Lange (born 1807 in Rudkøbing — 1856), merchant and entrepreneur
- Anders Sandøe Ørsted (born 1816 in Rudkøbing — 1872), botanist, mycologist, zoologist and marine biologist
- Johannes Pedersen (born 1883 in Illebølle — 1977), theologian
- Marianne Schroll (born 1942 in Rudkøbing), specialist in geriatric medicine

=== Politics ===
- Wincents Sebbelow (born 1770 in Tranekær — 1842), merchant and politician
- Anders Sandøe Ørsted (born 1778 in Rudkøbing — 1860), politician and former prime minister of Denmark
- James Rasmussen (born 1835 in Stoense), American politician
- Bjarne Nielsen (born 1957), politician and former mayor of the municipality
- Tonni Hansen (born 1958 in Kædebyhas), politician and mayor of the municipality
- Marlene Ambo-Rasmussen (born 1986 in Magleby), politician and MF

=== Art ===
- Ludvig Brandstrup (born 1861 in Tranekær — 1935), sculptor
- Jens Christian Bay (born 1871 in Rudkøbing — 1962), author
- Preben Lerdorff Rye (born 1917 in Rudkøbing — 1995), actor
- Bjørn Watt-Boolsen (born 1923 in Rudkøbing — 1998), actor
- Nikolaj Coster-Waldau (born 1970 in Rudkøbing), actor

=== Sport ===
- Ingrid Larsen (born 1912 in Rudkøbing — 1997), diver
- Hans Jørgen Boye (born 1942 in Rudkøbing), rower
