= Wincents Sebbelow =

Norwegian politician

Wincents Lassen Sebbelow (10 December 1770 – 19 April 1841) was a Danish born, Norwegian lawyer, merchant and politician.

== Biography ==
Sebbelow was born at Tranekær in Langeland, Denmark. He was the son of Jørgen Sebbelov (1731–91) and Catharina Maria Lassen (1742–83). He had a short military career in Denmark and in 1793, took the Danish legal examination. He came to Norway in 1796 and by 1800 he was in Kristiansand where he settled as a merchant.

During the Gunboat War, Great Britain conducted an economic war engaging its naval forces to prevent trade flowing within, into and out of the Danish-Norwegian waters. For Norway, participation in the war led to a severe economic downturn. In 1810, Sebbelow obtained the title of General War Commissioner (Overkrigskommissær) and functioned as a privateer. After the war, Sebbelow was elected to Norwegian Parliament in 1818. Sebbelow was re-elected to Parliament in 1821 and 1822. After serving at the second Extraordinary Parliamentary in 1822, he moved to Larvik where he was appointed military commissioner for Vestre Sønnafjelske and where he lived until his death.

== Sebbelows Stiftelse ==
Sebbelow was married to Justine Margrethe Arctander (1763–1826). They had a son, Christian August Sebbelow (1805–86) who inherited a significant fortune and excelled as a businessman, lawyer and public procurator. Christian Sebbelow died without direct heirs and was the founder of Sebbelows Stiftelse which was organized in Christiania (now Oslo) during 1867. The institution provided care for pregnant, unmarried women and provided temporary housing for mother and child after birth. Additionally it assisted the mother in establishing stable employment and residence. The institution is still in operation to the current time.

== Related reading ==
- Inger-Lise Stjernholm Fehn (2003) Kom ikke til meg med en lausunge" : om ugifte mødre som søkte tilflukt på mødrehjemmet Sebbelows Stiftelse i perioden 1892 til 1946 (Oslo: Fehn)
