= Spodsbjerg =

- Village
- Location within Region of Southern Denmark
- Coordinates: 54°55′35″N 10°49′32″E
- Country: Denmark
- Region: Southern Denmark
- Municipality: Langeland

Population (2020)
  - Total: 214

Spodsbjerg is a village in south Denmark, located in Langeland Municipality on the island of Langeland in Region of Southern Denmark.
