= Langeland Bridge =

Road bridge in Denmark

Langeland Bridge Langelandsbroen
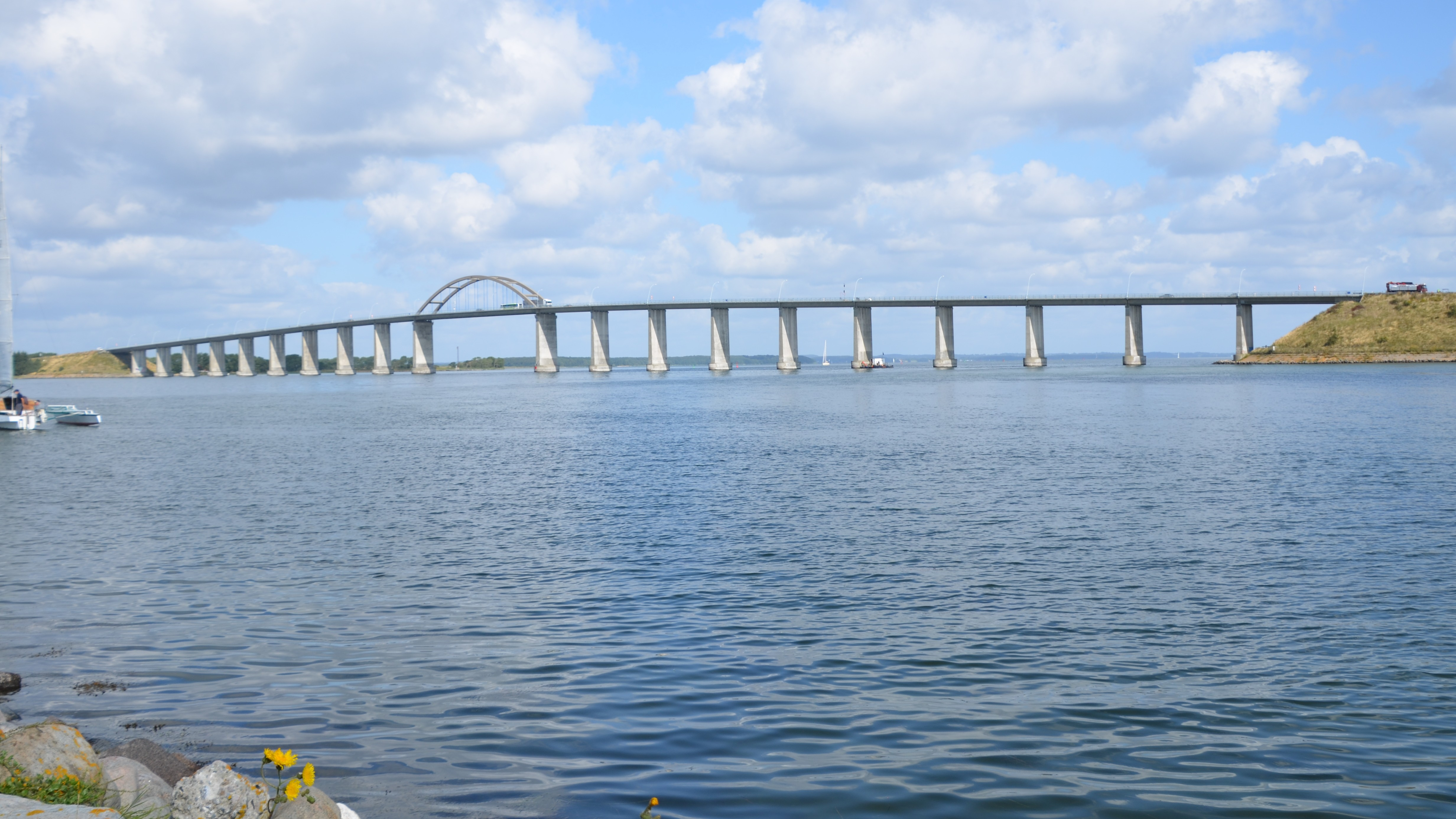
- Langeland Bridge as seen from Rudkøbing
- Coordinates: 54°56′52″N 10°42′27″E
- Carries: Pedestrians; Bicycles; Road traffic
- Locale: Langeland Municipality

Characteristics
- Design: Tied-arch bridge
- Total length: 774.0 m (2,539.4 ft)
- Width: 15.4 m (51 ft)
- Longest span: 92.0 m (301.8 ft)
- No. of spans: 21
- Piers in water: 20
- Clearance below: 26.0 m (85.3 ft)
- No. of lanes: 2

History
- Designer: Anker Engelund
- Construction start: 1960
- Construction end: 1962
- Inaugurated: November 10, 1962

Location
- Interactive map of Langeland Bridge

The Langeland Bridge (Danish: Langelandsbroen) is a road bridge that connects the islands Langeland and Siø. From Siø a connection exists via Tåsinge to Funen. It was built between 1960 and 1962.

== Dimensions ==
The Langeland Bridge is 771 metres long and 15 metres wide. The longest span is 91 metres, and the maximum clearance to the sea is 26 metres.

== See also ==
- List of bridges in Denmark
