= Hulbjerg Passage Grave =

- Hulbjerg Jættestue
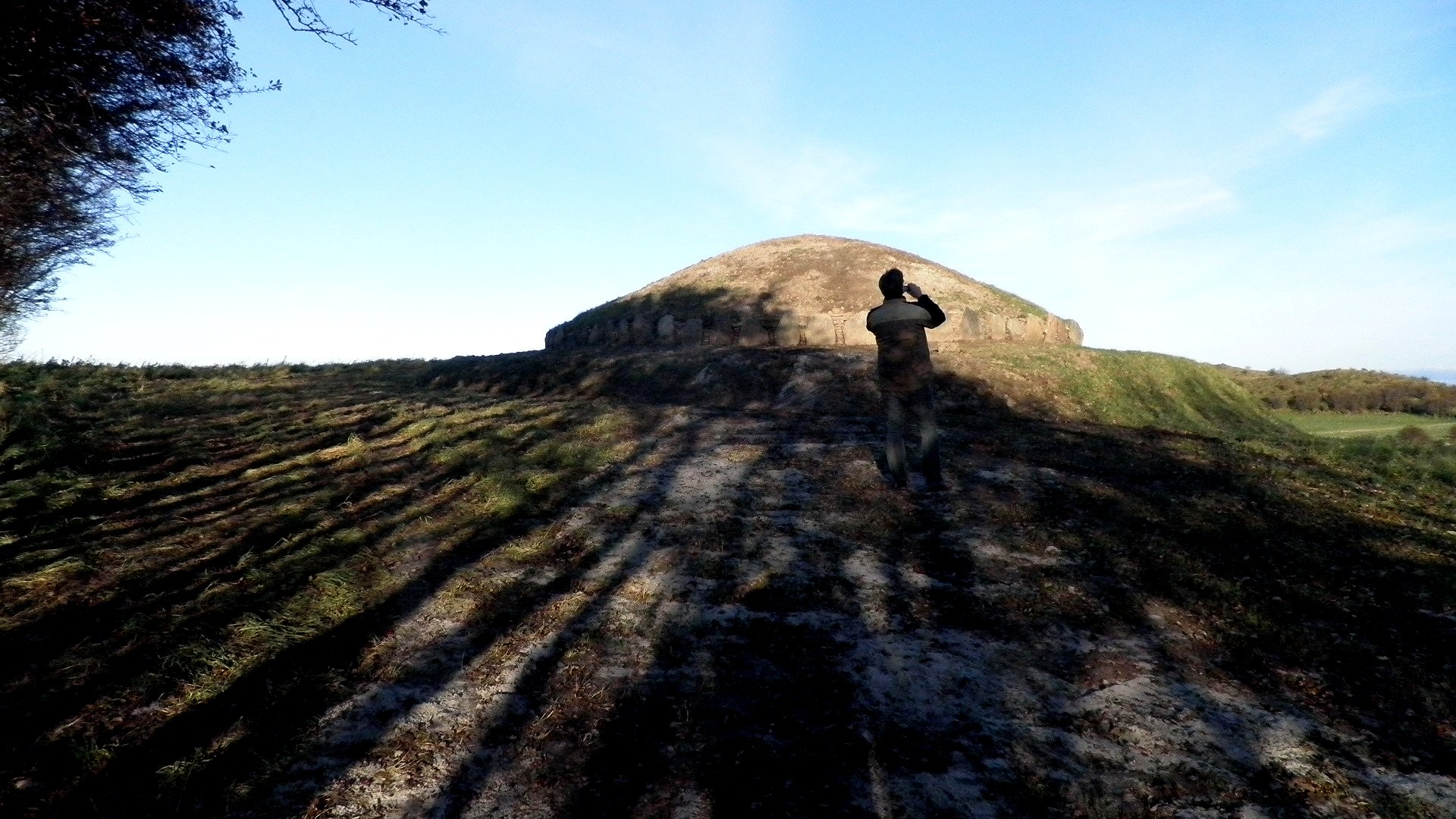
- The tomb in 2011
- Interactive map of Hulbjerg Passage Grave
- 54.7360465°N 10.6845932°E
- Type: Tomb
- Periods: Neolithic
- Cultures: Funnelbeaker culture
- Location: Bagenkop, Region of Southern Denmark, Denmark

History
- Built: c. 3250 BC

Site notes
- Material: Stone
- Diameter: c. 20 meters
- Excavation dates: 1960-1961
- Archaeologists: Håkon Berg
- Owner: Public
- Public access: Yes

The Hulbjerg Passage Grave (Danish: Hulbjerg Jættestue) is a passage grave located at the southern end of the Danish island Langeland, situated on a 15-meter hill south of the ferry harbour Bagenkop. Dating back to 3300–3200 BCE, it is part of the Neolithic Funnelbeaker culture, in short TRB or TBK. The grave consists of a chamber and a separate lateral passageway. This form of grave is predominantly found in Germany and Scandinavia, and to a lesser extent in France and the Netherlands.

== Description ==
The rectangular grave chamber is embedded in a round barrow of about 20 m diameter, framed by a ring of stones. The walls of the 6.5 x 1.7 metre chamber consist of 13 large uprights, tightly compacted with a fine wall of hewn stone tiles. On the exterior, the chamber is sealed with clay layered with crushed flint. The ceiling originally consisted of five large slabs of rock, of which three remain, complemented by two granite beams in 1961. The floor was laid with small flat stones covered in burnt flint. On the southern wall of the chamber, vertical stone plates form a separate section.

The passageway, 5 m long and uncommonly wide for this type of grave, opens in two places, with stone doorframes and doorsteps. At its one end lies a big flat stone, presumably used to close the entry.

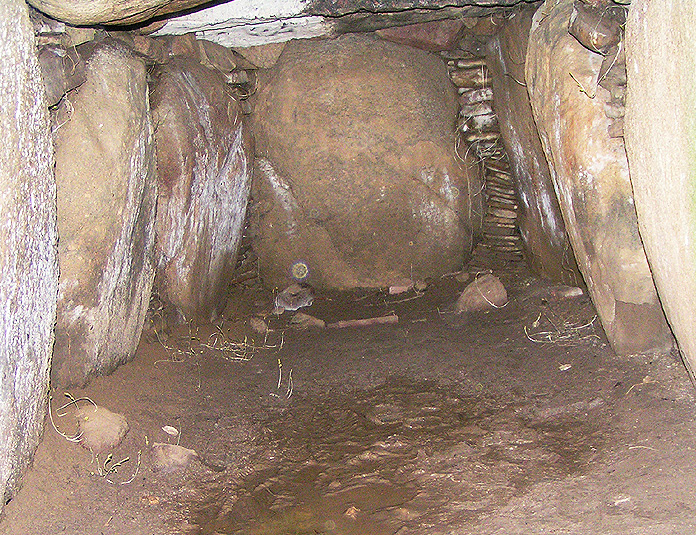
Interior

== Excavation ==
In 1960, the grave was excavated by one of Europe's leading experts in late Stone Age burials, Håkon Berg of the Langeland Museum. In the separate section in the grave chamber, sharpened flint axes and chisels, flint daggers, transverse arrowheads, decorated ceramics, amber beads as well as heaps of bones of 36 adults and 17 children were found. A skull found in the passage shows what might be the earliest known records of dental treatment: a flint drill had been used to drill down to - and possibly puncture a painful abscess in - the root canal of a molar tooth.

== Accessibility ==
The grave is located on public ground and is accessible all year. The parking lot is placed by the foot of the Hulbjerg hill. As the entry passage is low, one needs to crawl into the grave.

The excavated objects are on exhibition at the Langeland Museum in Rudkøbing.
