= Lindelse =

- Village
- Location within Region of Southern Denmark
- Coordinates: 54°51′46″N 10°43′44″E
- Country: Denmark
- Region: Southern Denmark
- Municipality: Langeland

Population (2026)
  - Total: 301

Lindelse is a village in south Denmark, located in Langeland Municipality on the island of Langeland in Region of Southern Denmark.
