= Jørgen Nielsen =

Jørgen Nielsen may refer to:

- Jørgen Nielsen (footballer, born 1923)
- Jørgen Nielsen (footballer, born 1971), Danish football goalkeeper
- Jorgen Nielsen (football manager), Danish footballer and manager
- Jørgen S. Nielsen (born 1946), professor of Islamic studies
- Jørgen Boye Nielsen (1925-2000), Danish Olympic hockey player
- Jørgen Erik Nielsen (1933–2007), professor of literature
