= Humble, Denmark =

Humble
- Town
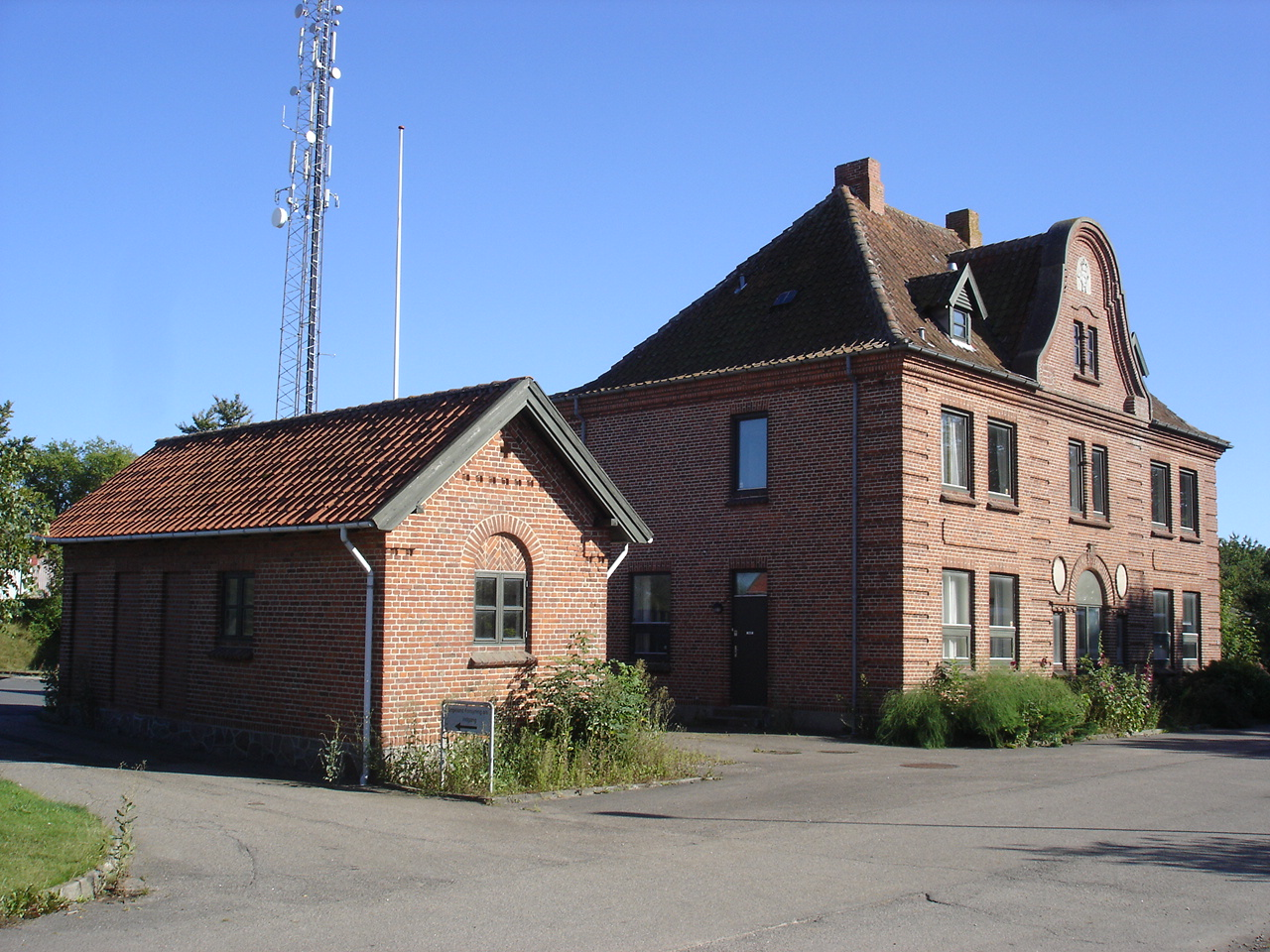
- Humble Station

- Location within Region of Southern Denmark
- Coordinates: 54°49′44″N 10°41′47″E
- Country: Denmark
- Region: Southern Denmark
- Municipality: Langeland

Population (2026)
  - Total: 562

Humble is a town in south Denmark, located in Langeland Municipality on the island of Langeland in the Region of Southern Denmark. It has a population of 562 (1 January 2026). Humble is located about 12 kilometers north of Bagenkop and 14 kilometers south of Rudkøbing.

== History ==
In the late 19th century, Humble had a doctor's house, a grocery store, and a sawmill. Humble Skytte og Forsamlingshus that no longer exists, was founded in 1884. A transcript of the house's first protocol is preserved.

Humble Station was a stop on the Rudkøbing-Bagenkop train line. The station was built in 1910 and closed in 1962.

== Facilities ==
The town has a bakery. Humble Inn & Hotel has built seven new rooms in 2008 and can accommodate parties of up to 150 people.

Music Efterskolen in Humble has many rehearsal rooms, a recording studio, and a fully equipped orchestra pit to the concert and theater. Schools organize the annual Christmas concerts, gospel concerts, musicals, etc. there.

Humble School was inaugurated in 1960 as Humble Central School.
