= Lohals =

- Town
- Location within Region of Southern Denmark
- Coordinates: 55°8′5″N 10°54′35″E
- Country: Denmark
- Region: Southern Denmark
- Municipality: Langeland

Population (2026)
  - Total: 433

Lohals is a town in south Denmark, located in Langeland Municipality on the island of Langeland in Region of Southern Denmark.
