= Tonni Hansen =

Danish politician

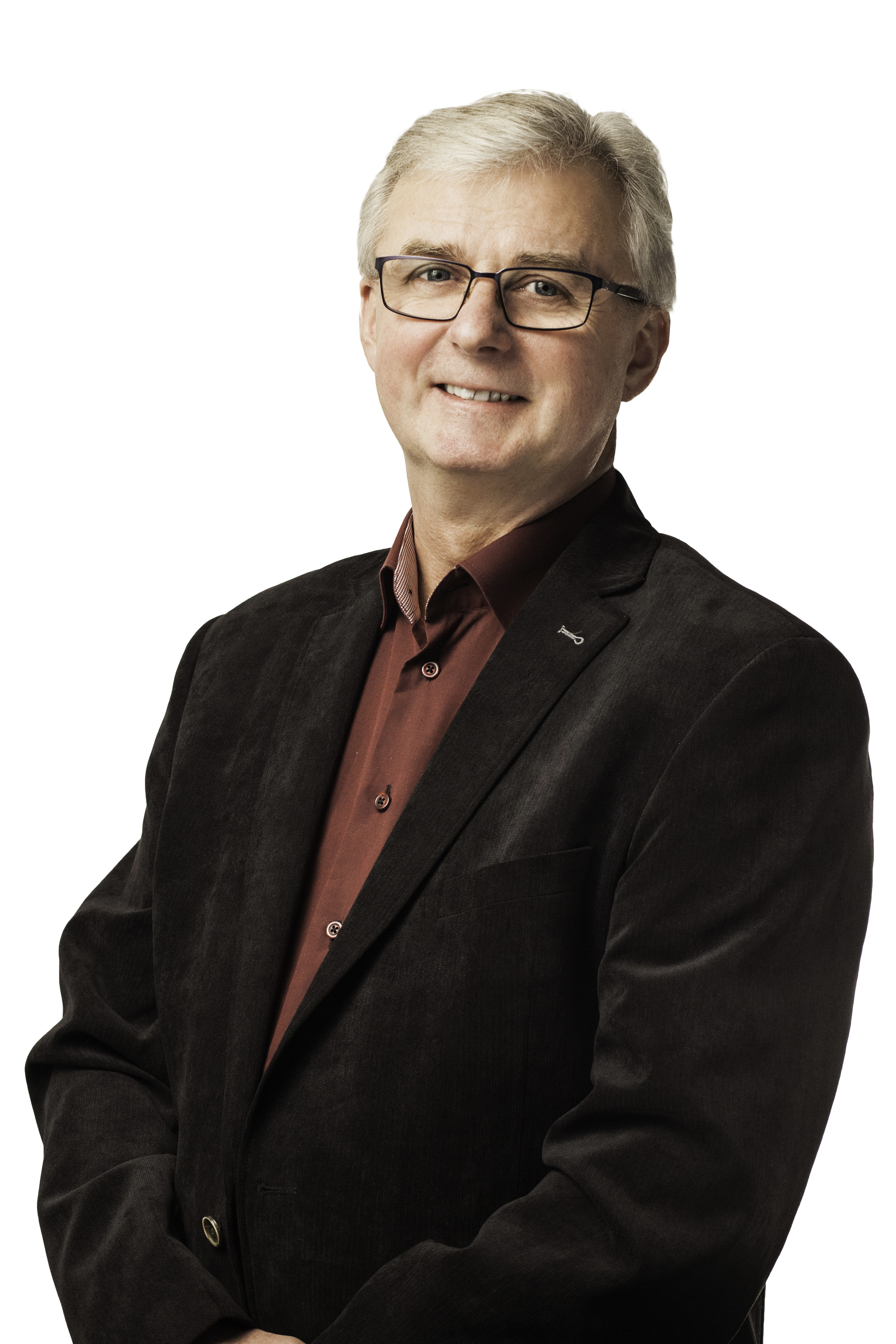

Mayor of Langeland Municipality
- Incumbent
- Assumed office 1 January 2018
- Preceded by: Bjarne Nielsen (V)

Personal details
- Born: 25 April 1958 (age 67) Kædebyhas, Denmark
- Party: Socialist People's Party

Tonni Hansen (born 25 April 1958) is a Danish politician. He is a member of the Socialist People's Party and has been the mayor of Langeland Municipality since 2018. He has worked with furniture manufacturing and later with unions. He has also worked with development in Malawi and Zambia. Hansen is married and has two children.

== Political career ==
Before the creating of Langeland Municipality, Hansen was in the municipal council of Rudkøbing Municipality from 1986 and until the municipality was merged with Sydlangeland and Tranekær in 2007.

In the 2014 European Parliament election, Hansen ran for European Parliament and became the 2nd substitute for the Socialist People's Party.

Hansen was elected into Langeland Municipality's municipal council - and also chosen as mayor - at the 2017 Danish local elections, after not having run for municipal councils since the merge of the three former municipalities on Langeland in 2007. In the election he received the most votes, by far, in the municipality with 2,189 votes. In comparison, the person with the second-most votes in the municipality received 428 votes.
