= Siø =

Island in Denmark

Coordinates: 54°57′15″N 10°41′30″E

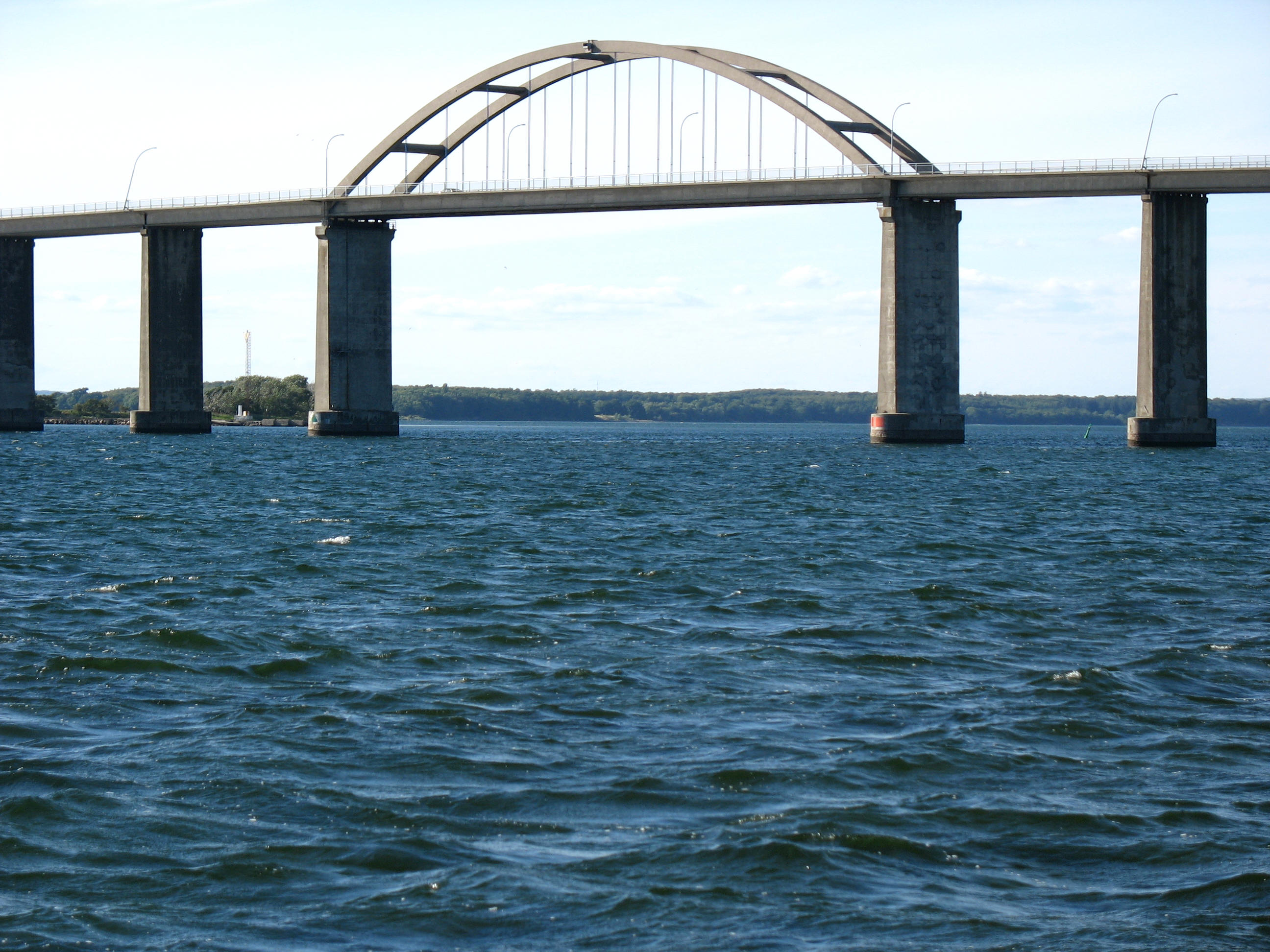
The Langeland Bridge from Rudkøbing to Siø

Siø is a small Danish island in the South Funen Archipelago between Tåsinge and Langeland. It is part of Langeland Municipality. With an area of 1.3 km^{2}, as of 1 January 2014 it has a population of 16. Since 1681, a system of dykes has expanded it to include the former islands of Skovø and Store Fugleø. In 1959, it was connected to Tåsinge by a causeway and a low bridge and, in 1962, to Langeland by a bridge. Today the island is used mainly for pig farming.

== See also ==
- List of islands of Denmark
- Langeland Municipality
