= Snøde =

- Village
- Location within Region of Southern Denmark
- Coordinates: 55°5′8″N 10°54′26″E
- Country: Denmark
- Region: Southern Denmark
- Municipality: Langeland

Population (2026)
  - Total: 247

Snøde is a village in south Denmark, located in Langeland Municipality on the island of Langeland in Region of Southern Denmark. Snøde has grown together with the village of Stoense.
