= Tullebølle =

- Town
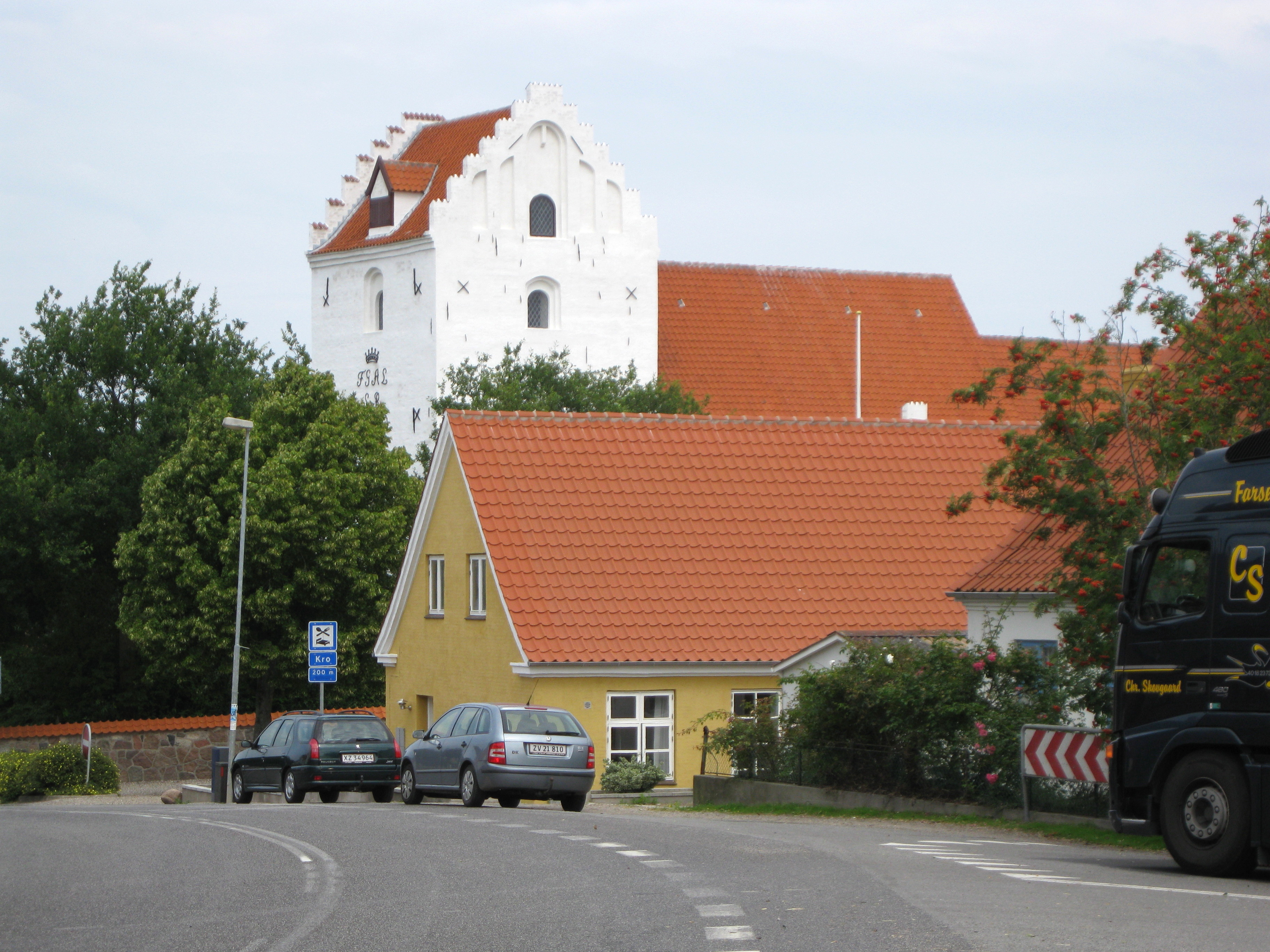
- Tullebølle Church

- Location within Region of Southern Denmark
- Coordinates: 54°57′27″N 10°47′55″E
- Country: Denmark
- Region: Southern Denmark
- Municipality: Langeland

Population (2026)
  - Total: 754

Tullebølle is a town in south Denmark, located in Langeland Municipality on the island of Langeland in Region of Southern Denmark. Tullebølle has a population of 754 (1 January 2026).
