= Bagenkop =

- Town
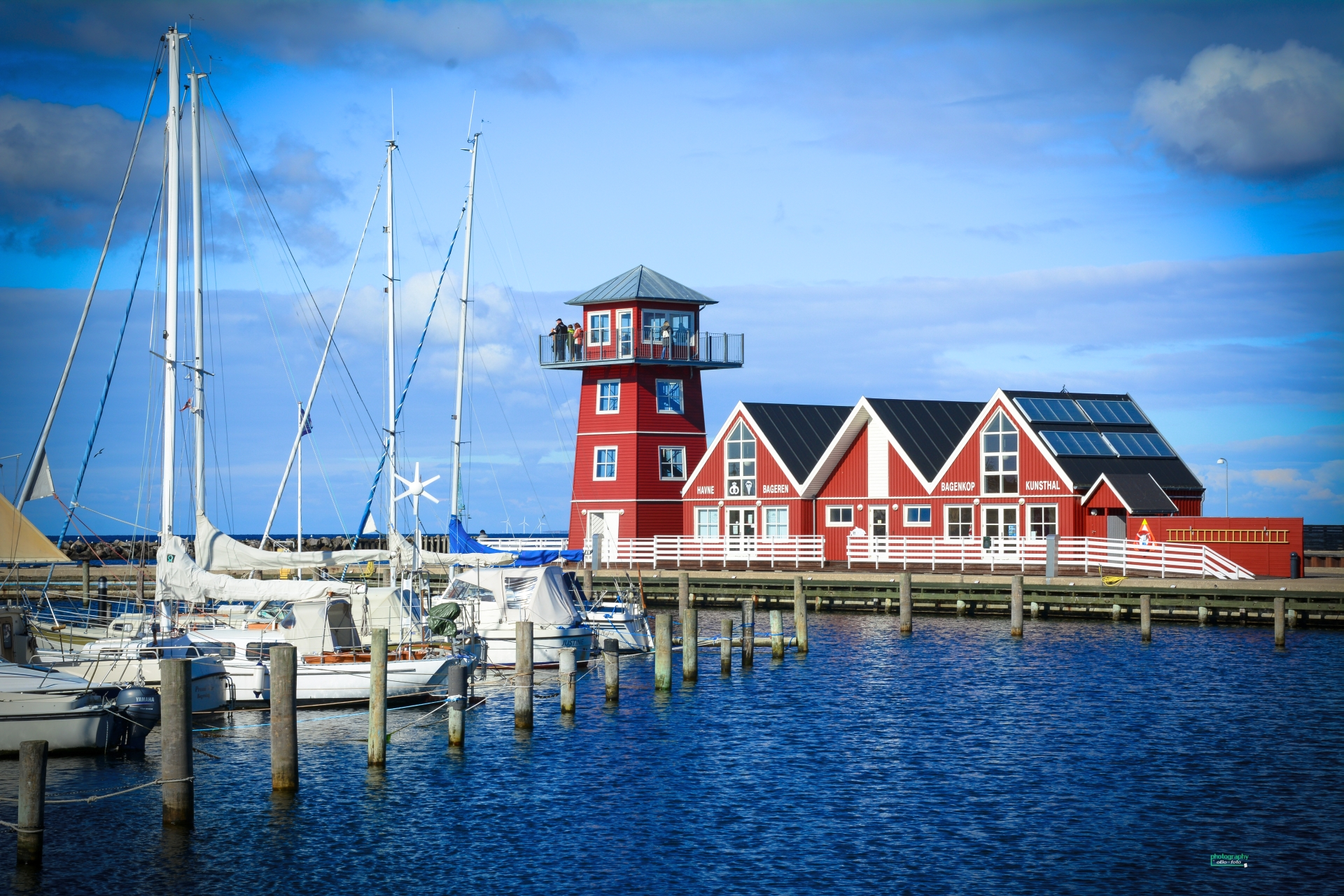
- Bagenkop Harbour

- Location within Region of Southern Denmark
- Coordinates: 54°45′0″N 10°40′36″E
- Country: Denmark
- Region: Southern Denmark
- Municipality: Langeland

Population (2026)
  - Total: 421

Bagenkop is a town in south Denmark, located in Langeland Municipality on the island of Langeland in Region of Southern Denmark.

== Sights ==
The Hulbjerg Passage Grave (Danish: Hulbjerg Jættestue) is a passage grave located south of Bagenkop. It is eight meters long and dates back to 3300–3200 BCE. The findings from the passage grave are displayed on Langeland's Museum. The passage grave was protected in 1966.

The Fishery House (Danish: Fiskeriets Hus) is a local museum located in Bagenkop. It focuses on the local history, as well as on fishery.
