= Guldborg =

- Village
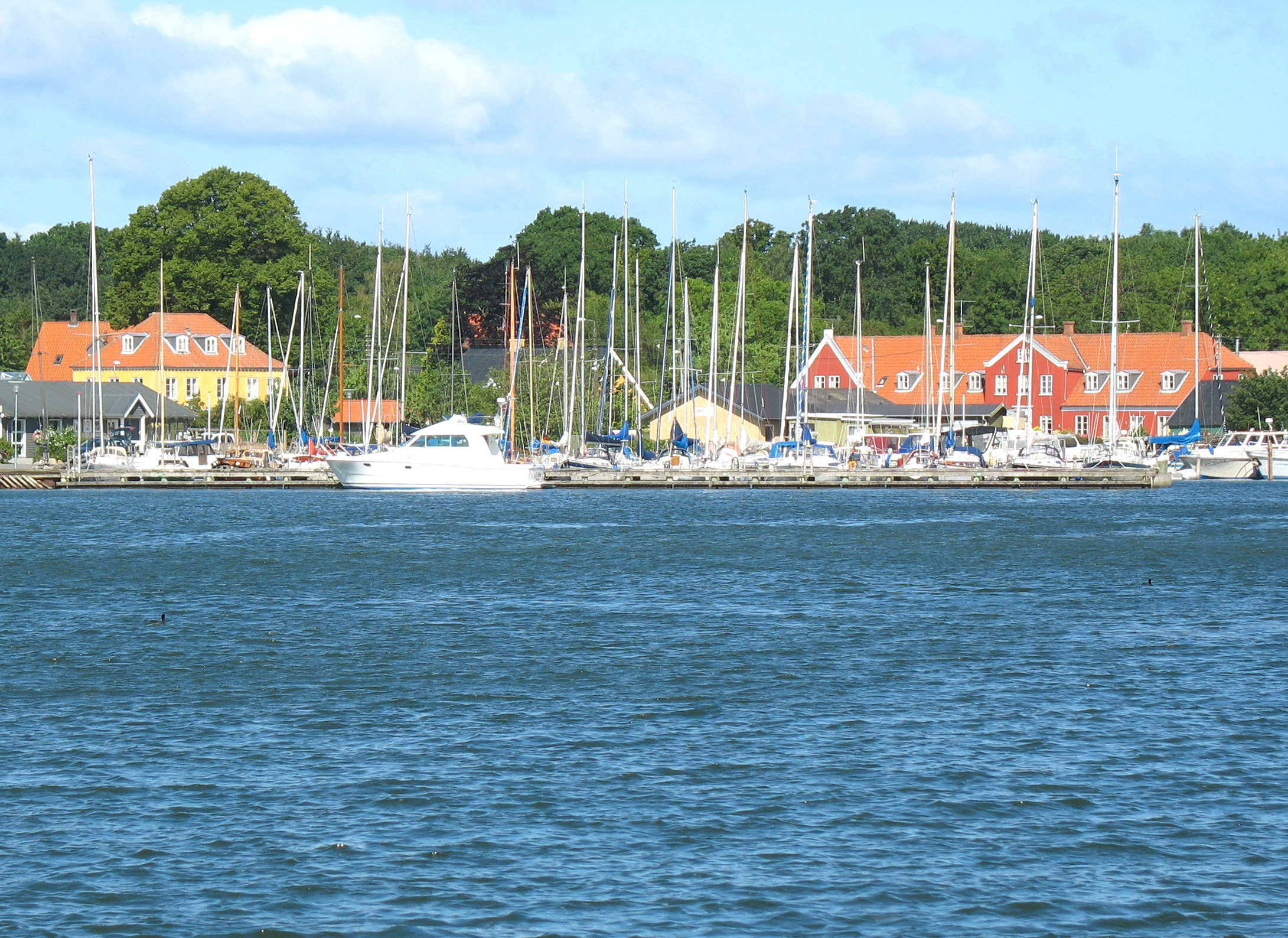

- Location on Falster
- Coordinates: 54°52′16″N 11°44′54″E
- Country: Denmark
- Region: Zealand (Sjælland)
- Municipality: Guldborgsund

Population (2026)
  - Total: 493
- Time zone: UTC+1 (CET)
  - Summer (DST): UTC+2 (CEST)

Guldborg is a fishing village spanning the islands of Falster and Lolland in Guldborgsund Municipality, Region Zealand, in Denmark. The village is located at the narrowest point between the two islands where Guldborg Bridge crosses Guldborgsund (or Guldborg) Sound. In 2026 the village had a population of 493, with about 400 living on Lolland.

== History ==
Guldborg was first documented as a ferry village in 1569. During the Second Northern War (1657–1660), embankments were built along the shore but this did not prevent the Swedes from conquering Lolland in 1658 and attempting to overcome the rest of Denmark.

By 1859, there were two farms and 40 houses in Guldborg as well as an inn, a windmill and a pilot station. The early ferries were rowboats, replaced in 1867 by a cable ferry and in 1904 by a motor ferry with space for two horse-drawn carriages. The old ferry station was destroyed by a storm in 1862. Its replacement is now in an advanced state of deterioration. The ferry stopped operating in 1934 when Guldborg Bridge, also known as Christian X's Bridge, was opened. A harbour, built in the 1860s for shipping timber from the surrounding forests, was later also used for grain, pigs and cattle. From the late 19th century to the mid-20th century, Guldborg also had a dairy, a bakery, a pottery, a sawmill and a fruit plantation.

From the mid-19th century, there was a wharf at Guldborg which was used mainly for building fishing boats. The first quay was established in 1947. The housework school, which operated from 1898 to 1905, was subsequently used as a women's college, then as a retirement home and latterly as a motel until 1997. Nearly all the traffic disappeared from Guldborg in 1988 when the Guldborgsund Tunnel connecting Falster and Lolland opened between Hjelms Nakke and Majbølle.

== Geography ==
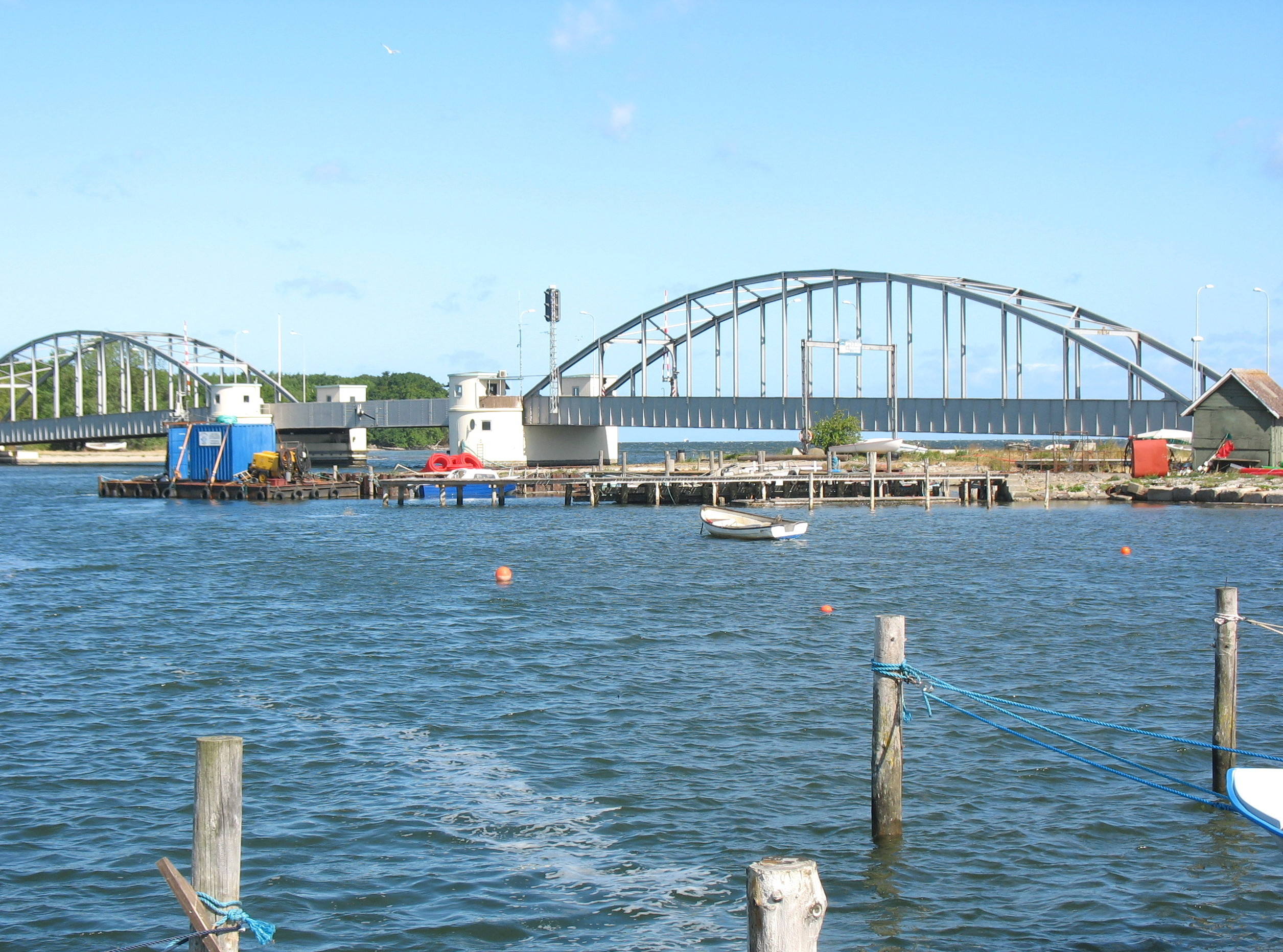
Guldborg Bridge

Guldborg is surrounded by three forests: Hillesvigskoven, Nordskoven, and Storskoven; Storskoven contains historic relics. Guldborg also borders Svenskeskansen (“the Swedish bulwarks”) whose history stretches to the 1659 Dano-Swedish War. The village also has a beach with bathing facilities. The shore is popular with fishermen and ramblers. There are two marinas, one on each side of the sound, with facilities for watersports. Both openings of Guldborg's double bascule-spanned bridge are lit. The bridge straddles a narrow part of the sound with only 30 metres (98 ft) being of navigable width. The sound is icy from January through March. Three churches are nearby, one with a steeple (at Kippinge), one with a tower (at Brarup), and one with a stepped tower (at Majbølle).

== Culture ==
Facilities in the village include a day nursery, food store, restaurant, activity centre and sailing services. There are bus connections with Vordingborg, Nykøbing Falster and Maribo. Guldborg used to provide a ferry crossing between Falster and Lolland. As a result, many of the buildings originated as residential premises and warehouses for merchants. There are a number of galleries where local craftsmen display their paintings, jewellery, pottery, glasswork and textiles. Guldborg has an active sports club where some 350 members enjoy gymnastics, volleyball, football and rollerskating. Guldborg Folk & Show Festival, an annual event, brings together regional musicians.
