= Frederik IX Bridge =

Bridge in Denmark

King Frederik IX Bridge Kong Frederik IX's Bro
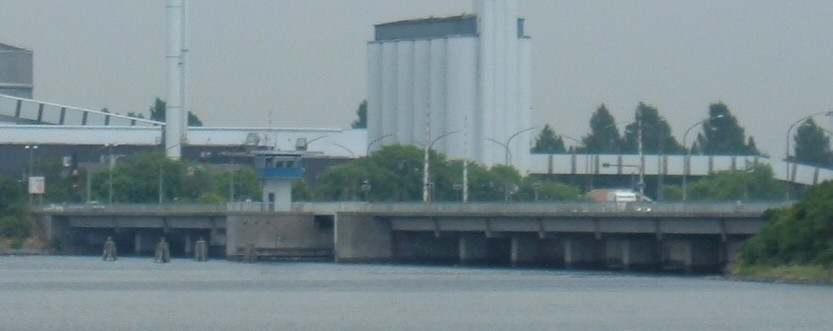
- Frederik IX Bridge
- Coordinates: 54°45′32″N 11°51′58″E
- Carries: Danish national road 9 Sydbanen; Lollandsbanen
- Crosses: The Guldborgsund strait
- Locale: Region Sjælland, Denmark
- Begins: Nykøbing, Falster
- Ends: Sundby, Lolland
- Named for: King Frederik IX of Denmark
- Owner: The Danish Road Directorate
- Maintained by: The Danish Road Directorate
- Website: www.vejdirektoratet.dk/kong-frederik-den-ixs-bro

Characteristics
- Design: Beam bascule bridge
- Total length: 295 metres (968 ft)
- Width: 33 metres (108 ft)
- Height: opens

Rail characteristics
- No. of tracks: 1
- Track gauge: 1,435 mm (4 ft 8 1/2 in)

History
- Construction start: 1960
- Construction end: 1962
- Inaugurated: 14 May 1963

Location
- Interactive map of King Frederik IX Bridge

The King Frederik IX bridge (Danish: Kong Frederik den 9's Bro; named for King Frederik IX of Denmark) is a combined road and railway bridge carrying the Danish national road 9 as well as Sydbanen and Lollandsbanen railway lines across the Guldborgsund strait between the islands of Falster and Lolland in Denmark. It joins the larger part of the city of Nykøbing on Falster with the smaller part of the town on Lolland. The rail link is a part of the railway section of the Fugleflugtslinjen transport corridor between Copenhagen, Denmark and Hamburg, Germany.

The bridge is 295 metres (968 ft) and 33.3 metres (109 ft) wide. It is a bascule bridge of beam design. The bridge carries four lanes of vehicle traffic and a single railway track.

== History ==
In 1867, after many years of discussion, a pontoon bridge, the Christian IX Bridge, was constructed across the Guldborgsund from Nykøbing to Lolland, which at its inauguration was the longest in Denmark. Furthermore, in 1875 a separate railway bridge was constructed to allow for the railway lines on Lolland to reach Nykøbing. Both bridges were swing bridges which could be opened for passing ships. These two bridges existed – with several reconstructions – until 1963.

The current Frederik IX Bridge was constructed between 1960 and 1962. The official opening was on 14 May 1963.

== Current construction ==
There is a decision to widen the bridge with one more rail track and to fit electric overhead line, in connection with the Fehmarn Belt Tunnel. In order to cut costs, a tunnel company wanted to disallow bridge openings. However, it was later decided that the new bridge will also open.

In 2023, the construction was slated to complete in 2026.

== Features ==
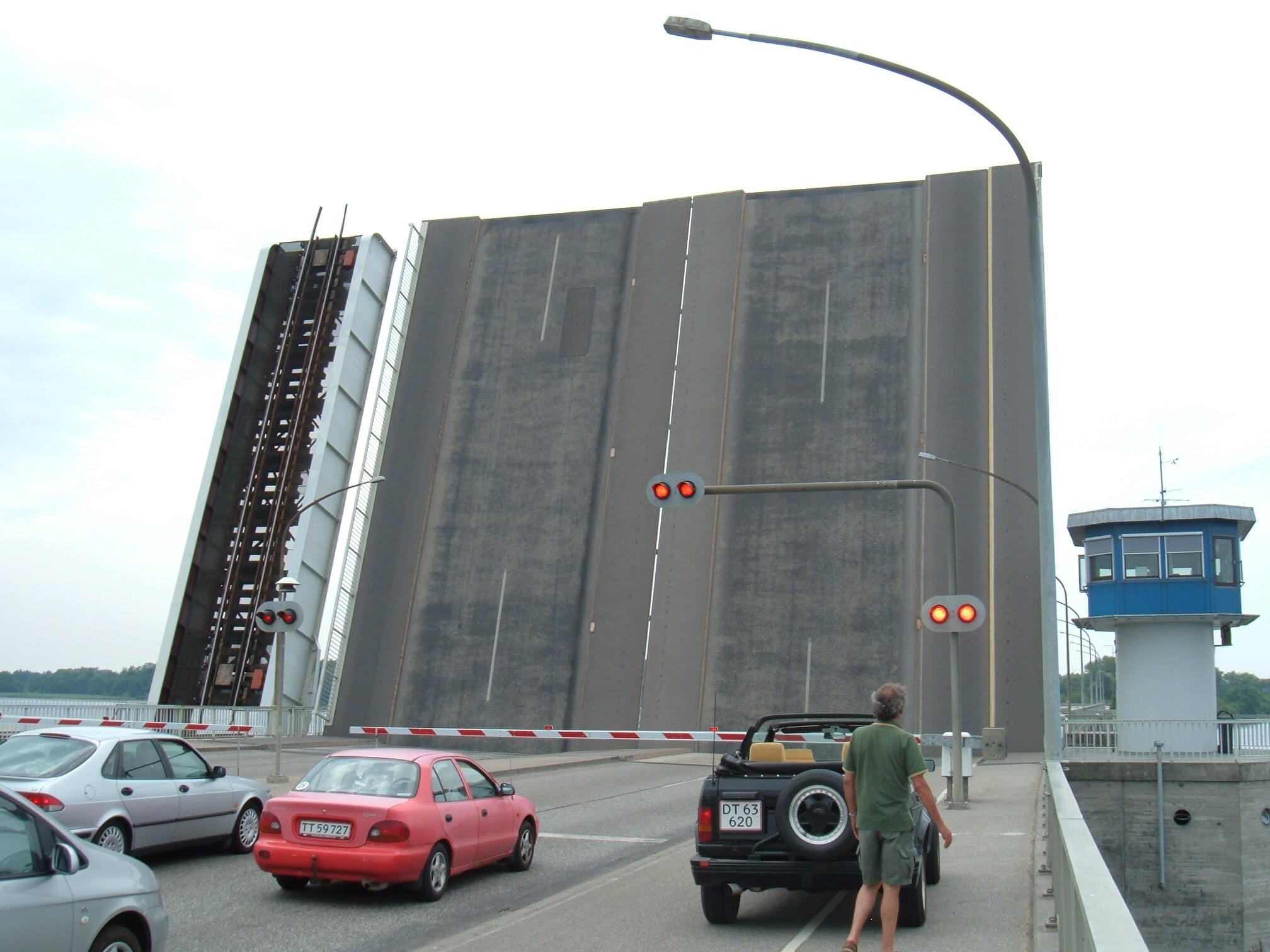
Rail and road bascules in raised position

The bridge has a central 20m span with two bascules, both on the eastern side of the bridge. One carries four lanes of vehicle traffic while the other carries a rail link. The two parts normally operate together. Bridge control is staffed during the day and opened on request for passing ships, but may only be opened once every half-hour. It is planned for the bridge to be re-equipped for automatic operation.

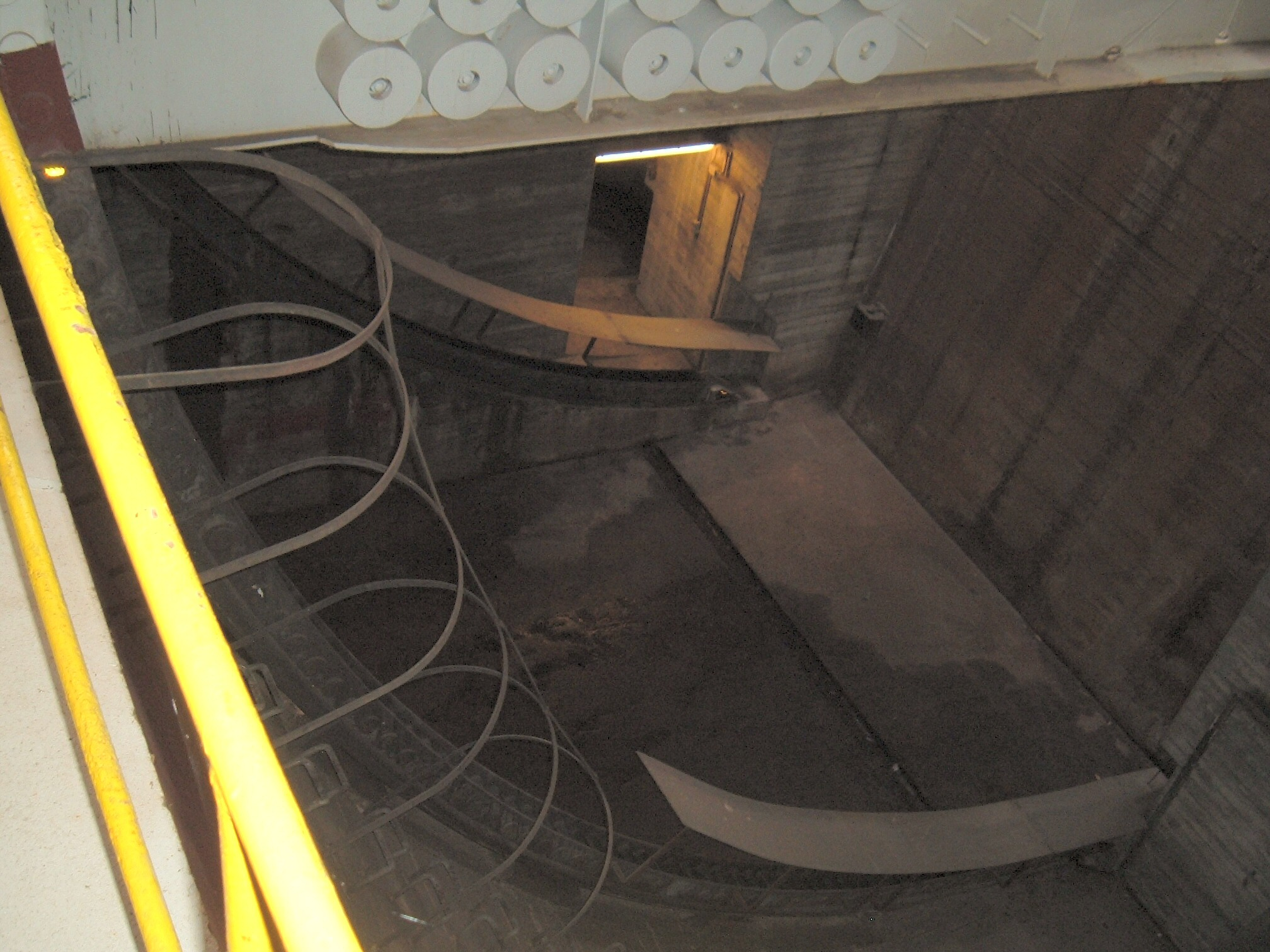
Chamber into which the bascule counterweights sink when raised, showing drive racks

The bascules consist of a long bridge span and a short counterweight section. Each bascule is supported by two pivot bearings, one either side. Two motors, one either side of the bridge, turn shafts passing through the centre of the pivot bearings. Further shafts take power to the rear of the counterweights, where there are pinions pressing against a rack mounted in the wall of the counterweight chamber, which drive the bascule.

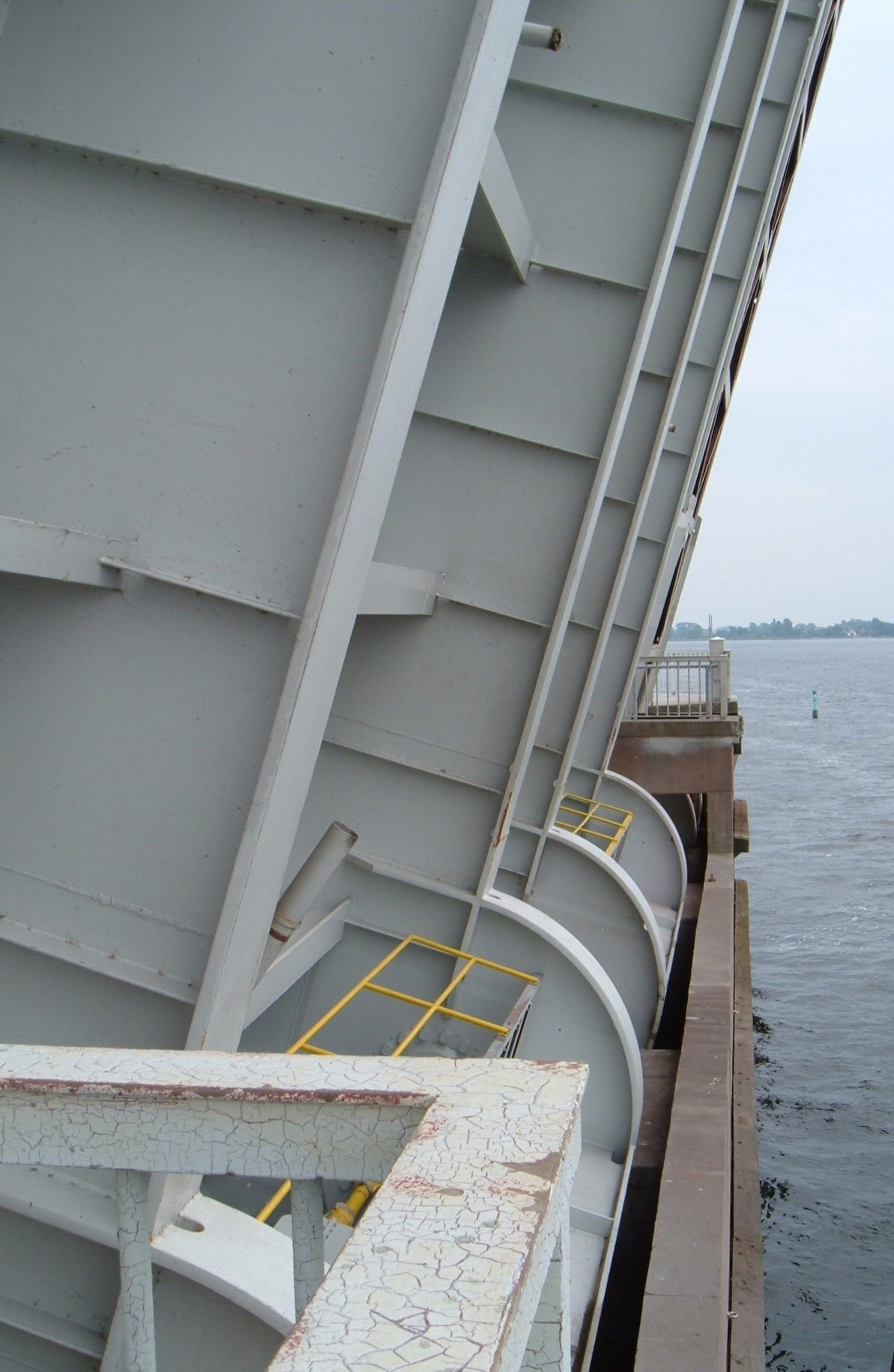
Underside of raised bascules, showing tipped up railings and yellow driveshaft

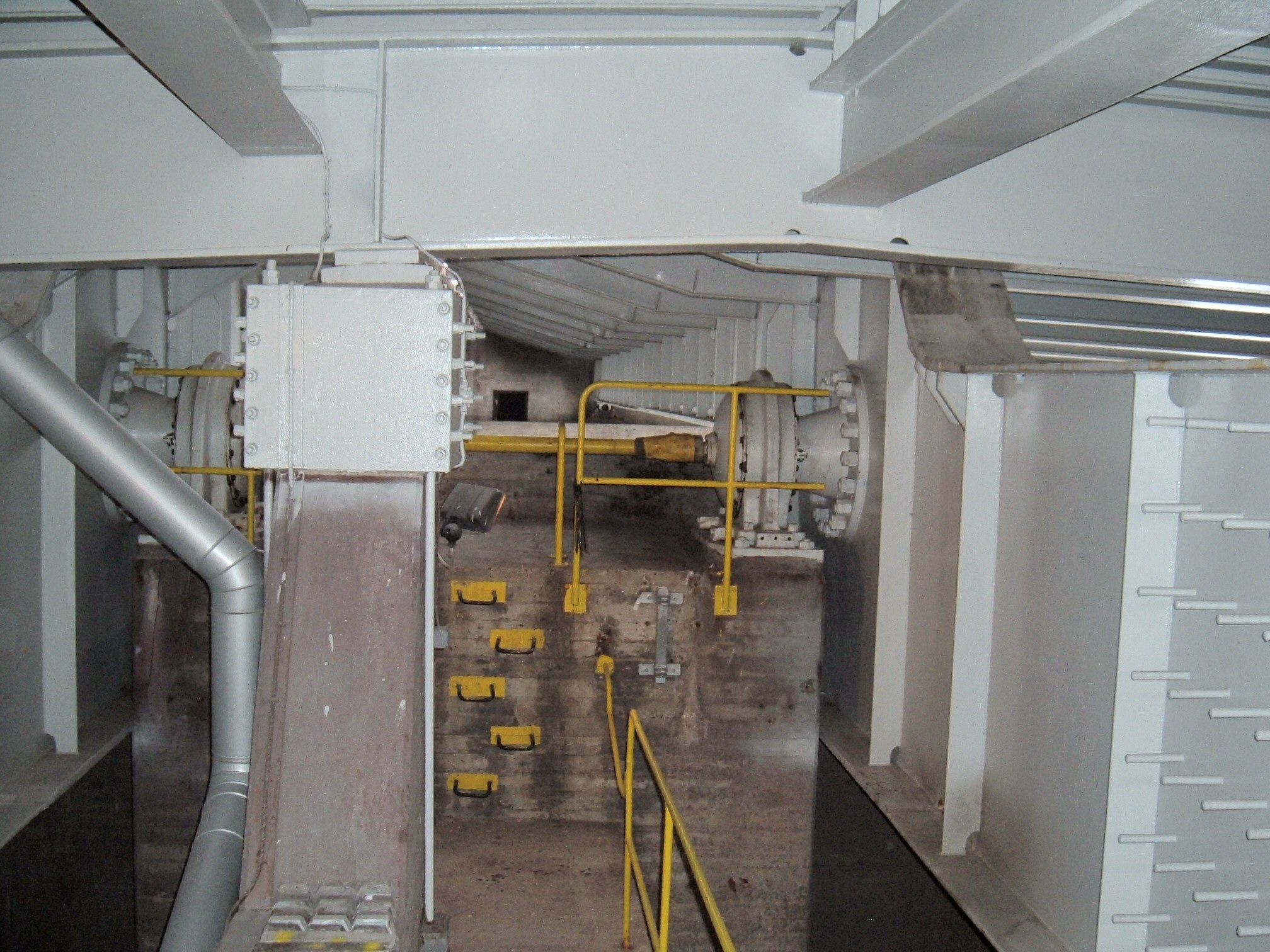
Underside of bascules, showing bearings about which bascules rotate, and yellow drive shaft

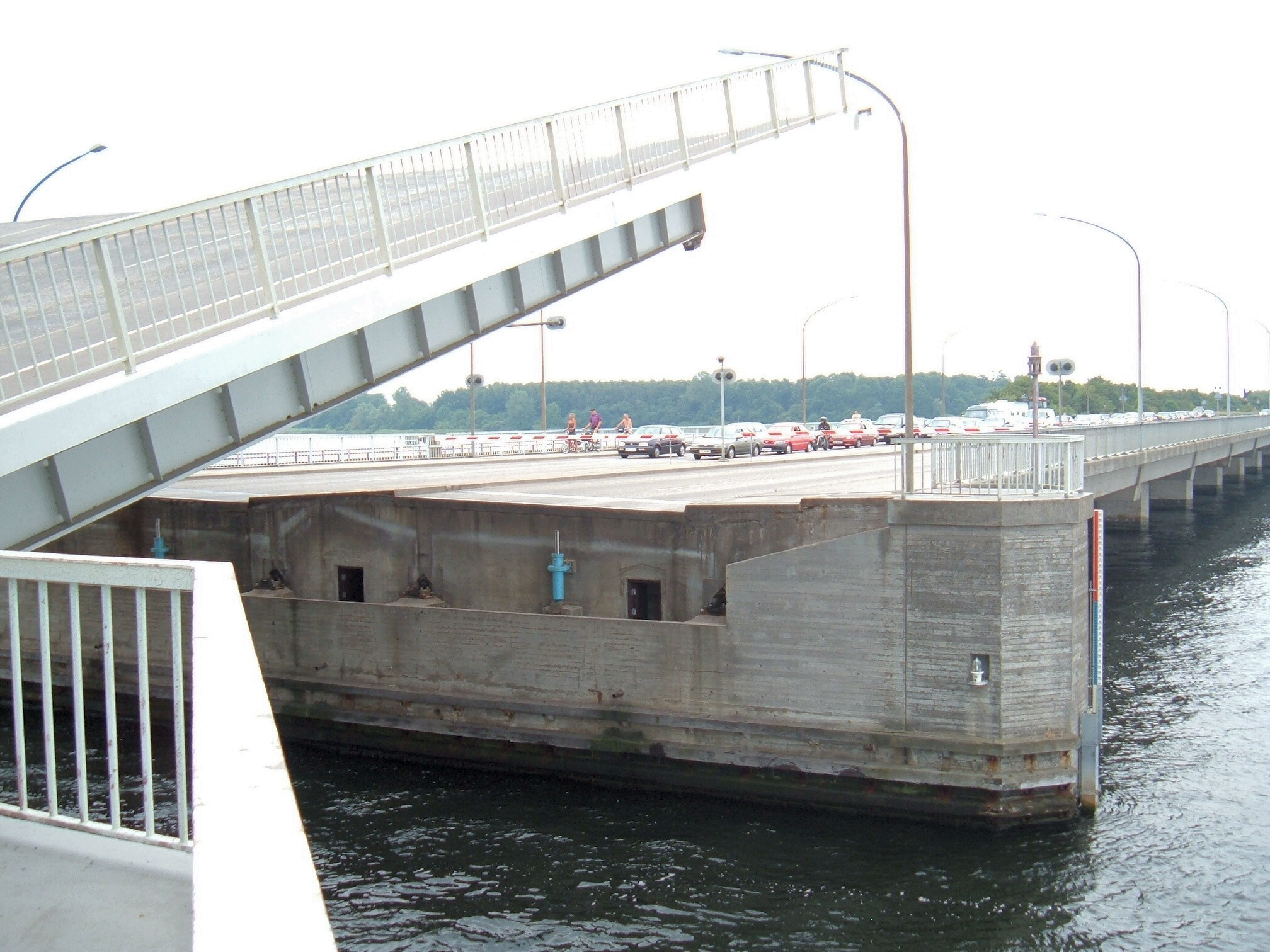
Bascules falling

== See also ==
- Danish national road 9
- Lollandsbanen
- Sydbanen
- Fehmarn Belt Fixed Link

== Bibliography ==
- Nørregård, Georg (1977). Nykøbing Falster gennem tiderne (in Danish). Vol. 1–2. Nykøbing Falster: Nykøbing Falster Kommune. ISBN 87-98-06-35-0-2.
