= USS MSC-257 =

R.F.M.NAZEEM

History

United States
- Name: USS MSC-257 / Guldborgsund (M 575)
- Namesake: strait of Guldborgsund
- Builder: Stephens Brothers, Inc., Stockton, California
- Laid down: 17 August 1955
- Launched: 17 March 1956
- Sponsored by: Mrs. Betty Bullen
- Completed: 11 November 1956, transferred to Denmark
- Commissioned: 19 November 1956, sa Guldborgsund (M 575)
- Decommissioned: 1 May 1993
- Fate: unknown

General characteristics
- Class & type: AM-218 / MSC-218 class motor minesweeper
- Displacement: 375 tons
- Length: 144 feet
- Beam: 27 feet
- Draft: 8 feet, 3 inches
- Installed power: Two General Motors diesel engines
- Propulsion: Two shafts
- Speed: 14 kts.
- Complement: 39
- Armament: Two 20 mm mounts, replaced by one 40 mm mount in 1965

USS MSC 257 was ordered as an AM-218 class motor minesweeper but the classification changed 7 February 1955 to MSC-218 class coastal minesweeper before construction. She was transferred to Denmark and performed her service there as Guldborgsund (M 575).

== Description ==
This was a minesweeping vessel that served in the Royal Danish Navy from 1956 to 1993.

== Construction ==
Laid down on 17 August 1955 by Stephens Brothers, Inc., Stockton, California, she was launched 17 March 1956. She was christened at Stockton, on 2 April 1956 by Mrs. Arthur C. Bullen Jr., formerly of San Bernardino, California, on the tenth anniversary of her marriage to Cmdr. Bullen, senior assistant in the office of the supervisor of shipbuilding, 12th Naval District, San Francisco.

MSC-257 was transferred to Denmark upon completion and was commissioned on 19 November 1956 as Guldborgsund (M 575).

== Fate ==
Guldborgsund was decommissioned 1 May 1993.
