= Kåre Johannessen =

Danish historian, writer, lecturer and presenter

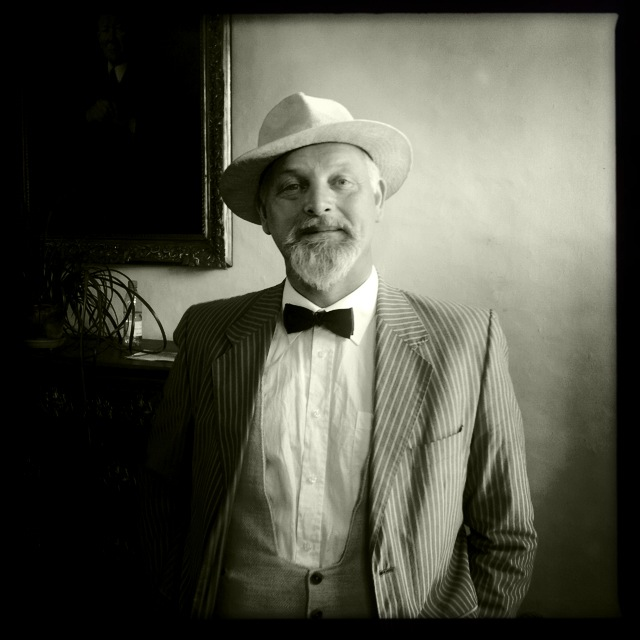
- Born: 1964 (age 61–62); Copenhagen, Denmark
- Occupations: Historian, curator, presenter, writer, lecturer
- Years active: 1994 – present
- Website: kaarejohannessen.dk

Kåre Johannessen (born 1964) is a Danish historian, writer, lecturer and presenter. He is the former curator of the museum of Trelleborg and Middelaldercentret, where he worked from 1994 to 1999 and again from 2004 to 2015. Today, he is a self-employed historian. While working at Trelleborg he recreated the Viking game of knattleikr and injured his knee so badly that he had to use crutches for a time.

Johannessen has written several non-fiction books about both the Middle Ages and the Viking Age and historical novels. He has hosted a series of programs on the regional TV Øst (a sub-channel of TV 2) about historical locations in Region Zealand and he has participated in historical quiz shows such as Historiequizzen (The History Quiz) on DR K. He has also been a historical expert in documentaries and series. He is very interested in the First World War and has founded a historical re-enactment group that portrays a group of German soldiers on the Western Front.

== Bibliography ==
Johannessen has written both fiction and non-fiction and has particularly worked with the Viking Age and Middle Ages.

Non-fiction

- 1993 Den hedenske islandske tvekamp, (Syddansk Universitet, Center for Historie)
- 1997 Magi og Heksetro i Nordisk Middelalder (Middelaldercentret) ISBN 87-984133-8-4
- 1998 Den Skæve Pind – Buen som Militærvåben i Middelalderen (Middelaldercentret) ISBN 978-87-984-1337-0
- 1998 Hor Saa Vide – Seksualiteten i Middelalderen (Middelaldercentret) ISBN 87-984133-9-2
- 2001 Politikens Bog om Danmarks Vikingetid (Politikens Forlag) ISBN 978-87-567-6456-8
- 2003 Blandt Krigere, Søfolk og Trælle – Vikingetid i Danmark (Forlaget Klematis) ISBN 978-87-7905-755-5
- 2004 Det Lo De Meget Af – Middelalderens humor (Middelaldercentret)
- 2004 Hvad Mønten Fortæller – en introduktion (Middelaldercentret)
- 2006 Stil og Status – møbler og boligindretning i middelalderens verdslige bygninger (Middelaldercentret) ISBN 978-87-990421-4-2
- 2011 Blandt Spøgelser, Gengangere og Andet Godtfolk – om det overnaturlige i middelalderen (Middelaldercentret)
- 2011 Guds Dilletanter... og Hvermands – teater i middelalderen (Middelaldercentret)
- 2014 Løgne, misforståelser og halve sandheder. 10 myter om middelalderen (Middelaldercentret)
- 2014 Middelalderens tyske fægtemestre (Middelaldercentret)
- 2020 Magt og Mennesker i Danmarks Middelalder (Turbine Forlaget), ISBN 978-87-406-5851-4
- 2021 Lyst og lidenskab i middelalderen (Turbine Forlaget), ISBN 978-87-406-6791-2
- 2021 Mørkets Skabninger (Turbine Forlaget), ISBN 978-87-406-7383-8
- 2023 Fritid og Forlystelser (Turbine Forlaget), ISBN 978-87-406-9418-5

Articles

- 1995 "Den militære udrustning i Bayeux-tapetet", s. 137–168, Vaabenhistoriske aarbøger, bd. 40
- 1996 "Middelalderligt Artilleri…", Vaabenhistoriske aarbøger 29/4
- 2001 "Naboskab", Skalk, 5:2001
- 2002 "Educational Aspects of Killing…", Viking Heritage Magazine, 4/2002
- 2003 "Blod, sved og latter: et benknusende boldspil genskabes" s.4-10 Siden Saxo Årg. 20, nr. 1
- 2007 "Instant Justice? A note on the holmgangslaw of Kormaks Saga", Zeitschrift für Historisches Waffen-und Kleiderkunde

Fiction

- 2008 Blodsbånd (Slægten, bind 7, Aschehoug) ISBN 978-87-112-9279-2
- 2008 Vredens Dag (Slægten, bind 9, Lindhardt & Ringhof) ISBN 978-87-7089-205-6
- 2009 Forræderen (Slægten, bind 12, Lindhardt & Ringhof) ISBN 9788711421574
- 2009 Kejserhøgen (Borgens Forlag) ISBN 9788721035563

== Filmography ==
- 2009 12 Paces Without a Head, German movie
- 2010 En God Historie (Tv2 øst, documentary)
- 2011 Historien om en Købstad (Tv2 øst, documentary)
- 2013 Kåres Danmarkshistorie (Tv2 øst, documentary)
- 2013–2015 Historiequizzen (DR K, quiz show)
- 2013 Kåre kigger på Kunst (Tv2 øst, documentary)
- 2013 Vikingeborgen Trelleborg (dk4, documentary)
- 2014 I krig for Danmark episode 2 og 6 (DR K, documentary)
- 2014 Duellen (Tv2 øst, quiz show)
- 2015 Det danske Guld (DR K, documentary)
- 2016 Guld i Købstæderne episode 6 (DR)
- 2016 Rejsen til Slagmarken (DR K, documentary with Cecilie Nielsen)
- 2018 Kåre spidder myter (Tv2 East, documentary )
- 2018 I krig & kærlighed (movie, extra)
