= Middelaldercentret =

Archeological open air museum in Denmark

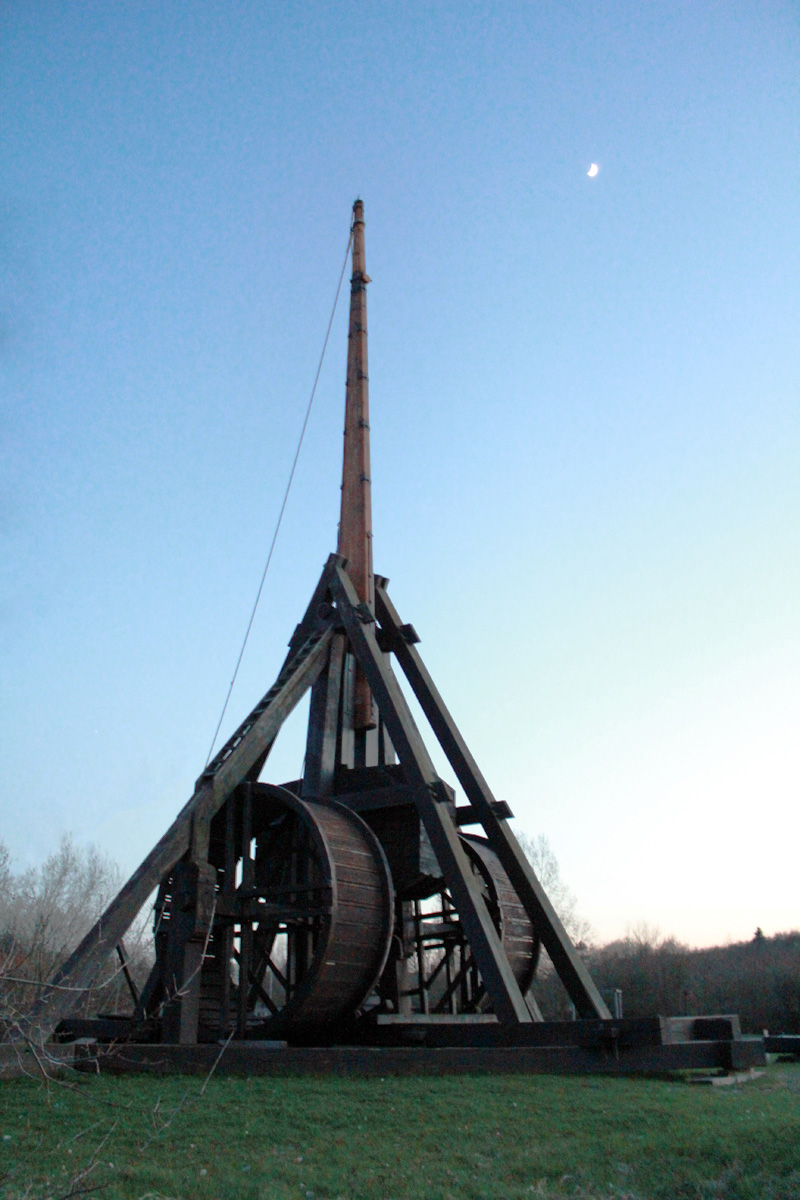
- The trebuchet at the Middle Ages Center
- Established: 1989
- Location: Middelaldercentret, Ved Hamborgskoven 2, Sundby. 4800 Nykøbing Falster
- Coordinates: 54.777°N 11.84°E
- Type: Open-air museum
- Visitors: 44.968 (2016)
- Founder: Peter Vemming
- Director: Poul Schreiner Hansen (interim director)
- Curator: Thit Birk Petersen
- Website: middelaldercentret.dk

Middelaldercentret (English: The Medieval Centre) is an experimental living history archaeological open-air museum in Denmark, which depicts the Middle Ages in the Denmark of the late 14th and early 15th centuries. It is located in Sundby Lolland, some 4 km northwest of the centre of Nykøbing Falster on the waterfront of Guldborgsund.

It features a town built as part of a typical Danish market town with craftsmen, a harbour with ships and boats, and a market place. The employees are dressed in period costumes and live and work in the houses and do everyday activities such as craftmanship, cooking and weapon training. Furthermore, the museum has a variety of siege weapons of the period, such as trebuchets, a ballista and a cannon and smaller weapons such as handguns, longbows and crossbows. All of the items are built on site using period tools. Activities include live firing of the weapons daily, archery, knightly tournaments, and demonstrations of crafts and tasks from the late 14th century and early 15th centuries.

The employees are both permanent staff and unemployed people sent in job training from the municipality. In addition, a support association exists, from which a large group of volunteers participates in the daily work. All the involved people "live in the medieval period", which means that they do not know of modern things like television, cellphones and so on. The former curator of the centre was the historian, writer and lecturer Kåre Johannessen. By 2016, the curator was Thit Birk Petersen. In 2021 Roeland Paardekooper took over as director He left the position in December 2023 allegedly because he was dismissed. Poul Schreiner Hansen was installed as interim director after this.

Besides normal museum activities, the Middle Ages Centre does extensive research within the Middle Ages and different medieval technologies, and the museum has reconstructed weapons, ships, clothing and diving equipment among others. The museum has a reputation of being the most authentic place in Europe within the medieval period. Due to the authenticity the medieval town has been used as a setting for many movies, documentaries and TV series.

== History ==
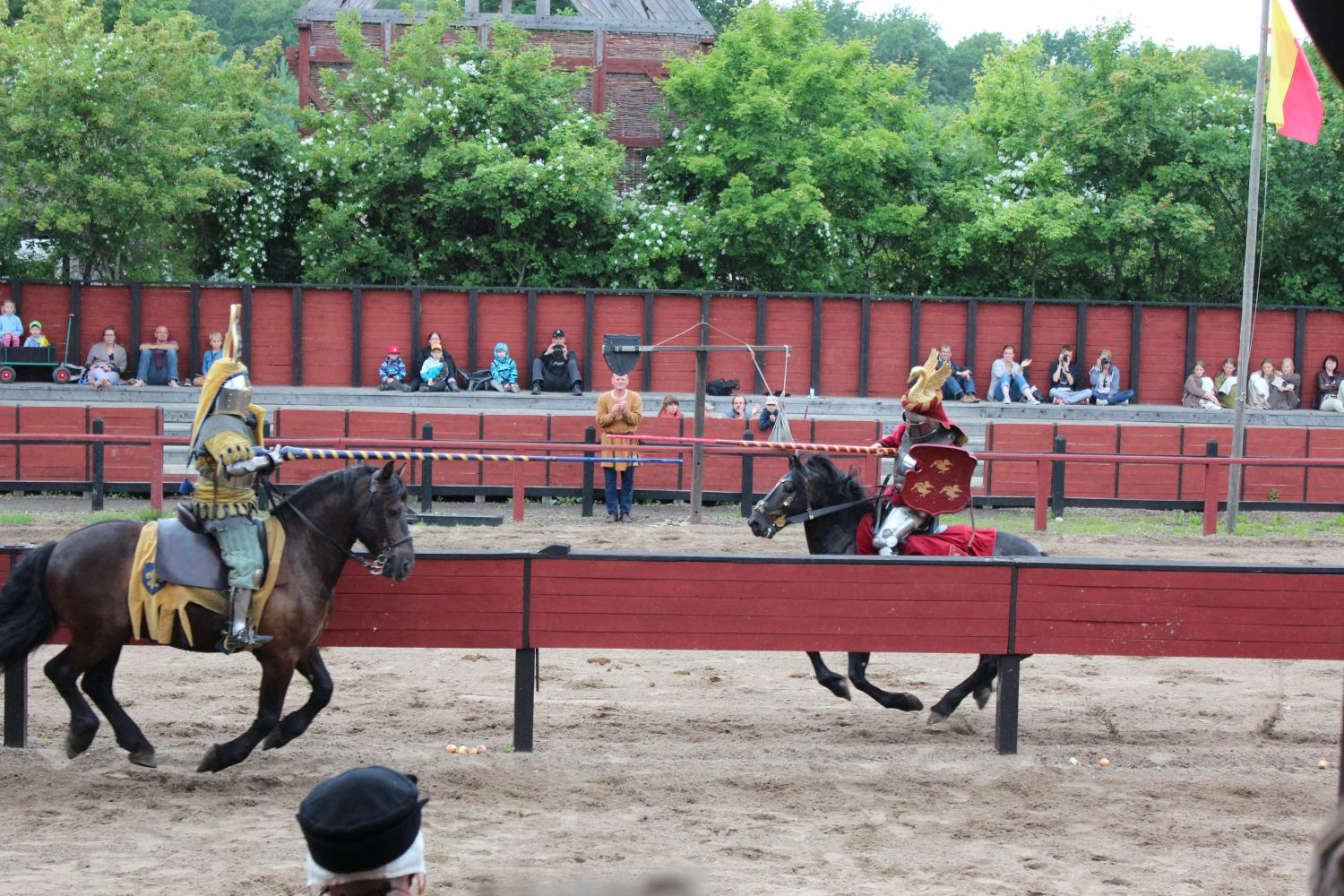
Jousting at the museum

The Middle Ages Centre started with the reconstruction of a medieval siege weapon, called a trebuchet, built to mark the 700th anniversary of Nykøbing Falster in 1989. The local museum reconstructed the trebuchet and the experiment ran for three weeks in which 15000–30000 people visited the site. Given the considerable interest in the trebuchet, a scoping project, "Medieval Technology Centre", was conducted for two months in the summer of 1991. The project consisted of a series of workshops and a kitchen tent set up around the trebuchet. As a private institution, The Middle Ages Centre was founded in 1992. Two years later, in 1994, a donation from Arbejdsmarkedets Feriefond (a non-profit foundation) made it possible to build an entire settlement with houses, tournament lists, a harbour, and a new entrance building. Since then, more houses have been built and one major new project is carried out each year.

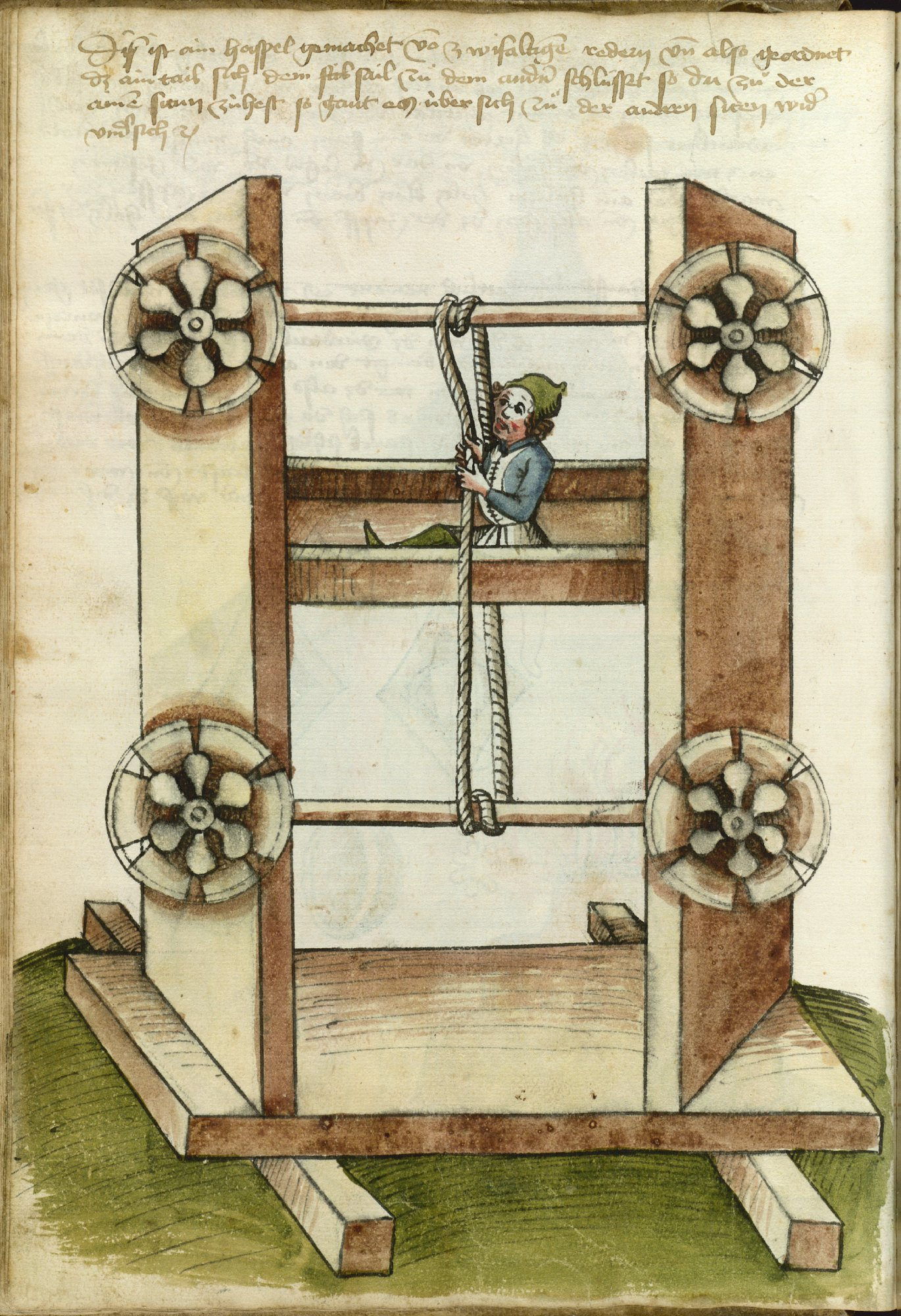
Illustration from the manuscript of Hans Talhoffer

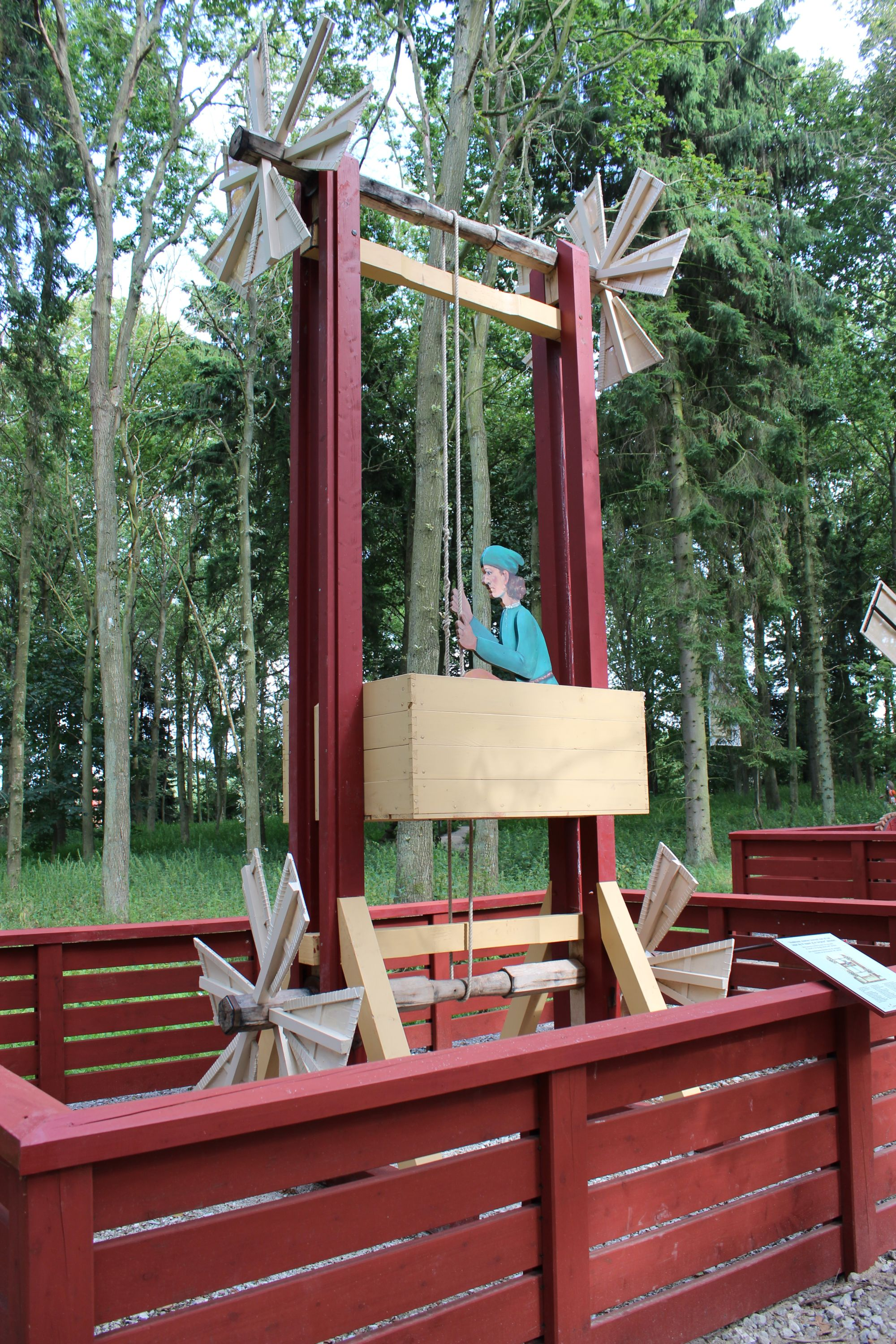
Reconstruction in full size

Wind powered lift, an example from the technology park

In 2013 the museum opened a technology park where inventions and technologies from the medieval period have been built full size for the audience to try. Many of these have not been built before and have only been an idea on a paper and some would never work in reality such a perpetual motion machine and the world's first car built from a drawing from the Italian engineer Giovanni Fontana. In 2014 a new war wagon was introduced and added to the daily display of siege engines. It is made from a depiction from the manuscript Hausbuch at Schloss Wolfegg and is said to be the first tank in history.

In 2020 the museum opened a new attraction called Griffenholm which is an area with treetop houses with a steampunk like interior and elements from Jules Verne and Harry Potter where a fictional professor is investigating the area for mythical creatures from the Middle Ages. The area is mostly for schools but is also used for escape rooms.

== Concept ==
Living history is central to The Middle Ages Centre and the focus is a Danish market town in the period around the year 1400. The centre follows the current calendar, but offset by 610 years – in 2014 the year 1404 is depicted and so on.

The centre's work is based on thorough research. The purpose of the work is partly dissemination, but also academic research, especially in the form of so-called experimental archaeology where ancient tools and technology is reconstructed on the basis of extant sources and objects in exhibitions around the world, and then tested in practice.

Staff and volunteers dress in period costume, and live in the opening hours just as they would have 610 years ago. Both volunteers and employees are thoroughly trained so as to make sure that they are professionally equipped to assume the role of medieval people. Neither glasses nor piercings are allowed and the inhabitants don't know about mobile phones, TV or other modern things, as these are not a part of the concept. Volunteers are co-ordinated by the Guldborgsund Guild (Guldborgsund Gildet).

The museum has a restaurant called The Golden Swann, which is furnished as a dining hall at a major Danish castle around 1400. It serves authentic medieval food by candlelight. The restaurant is independent but meets the same requirements regarding authenticity as the rest of the centre.

== Research and reconstructions ==
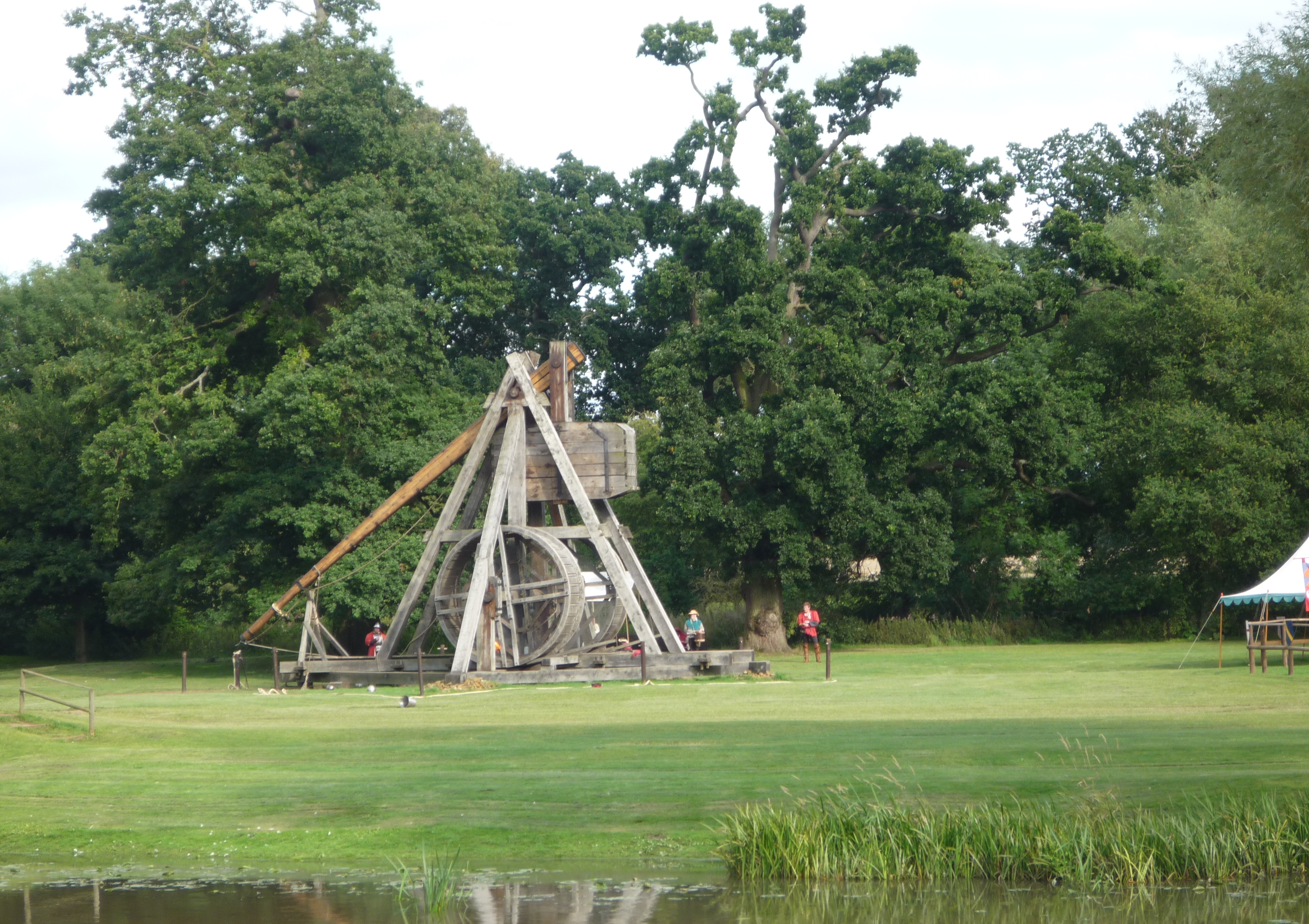
The trebuchet at Warwick Castle build by Middelaldercentret

The centre was the first in the world to reconstruct an actual working trebuchet in 1989. Since then the centre has been hired to help build the trebuchet at Warwick Castle, Warwickshire, England which was the largest functioning trebuchet in the world for six years. In 2011 the Middelaldercentret took back the record, putting a longer throwing arm on the machine after the old one broke. The new throwing arm is just 5 centimeters longer than the one on the machine at Warwick Castle.

Together with Moesgård Museum the museum has reconstructed the world's oldest cannon cast in bronze.

The centre participated in the third Galathea expedition (2006–2007) and researched both sulfur and saltpeter in black powder production in Puducherry, India and transportation to Europe. Furthermore, research regarding textiles, winter habitation, and the manufacture of medieval war machinery has been carried out. A conference about black powder manufacturing was held at Middelaldercentret in 2010.

The construction of a medieval church began in 2010. It is a reconstruction of Kippinge Church in northwestern Falster, Denmark.

== Other ==
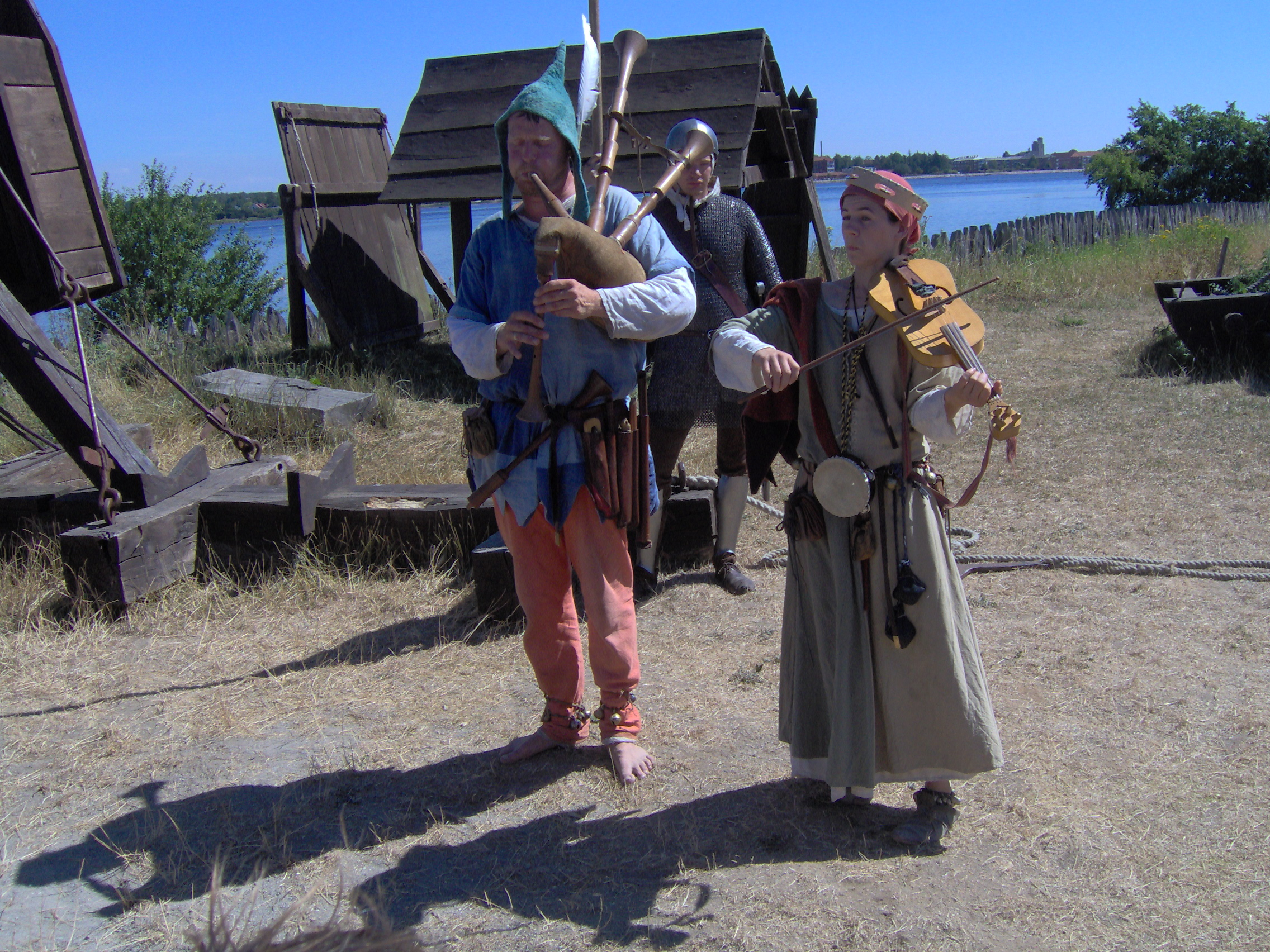
Musicians at the Middle Ages Centre

Medieval reenactment groups from around the world visit the centre during the season. Since 2010, there has been held a week-long festival during the summer holidays, where international reenactment groups have been invited. During these specific festivals, the time period and region of interest being portrayed been extended to embrace broader medieval life. The international group Company of Saynt George, dealing with the years 1460–1490, has been a guest several times at these events. The centre also runs courses on historical use of medieval weaponry, which are often attended by members of historical European martial arts groups, such as the Laurentius Guild.

A historical reenactment society from King Edward's School, Birmingham have visited the museum several times as a part of their education.

Given its unique medieval features, the town it has been used as a set for both national and international film productions. Thus both National Geographic Channel has recorded a documentary about early inventions such as diving equipment and throwing machines and the Danish movie Vølvens forbandelse and the German film 12 Paces Without a Head has scenes shot at the centre. In 2006 the documentary program Mark Williams' Big Bangs which is a history of explosives with Mark Williams used the centre to blow up a boat for the series. Weapons from the centre has also been used in the History Channel series Ancient Discoveries.

== Gallery ==
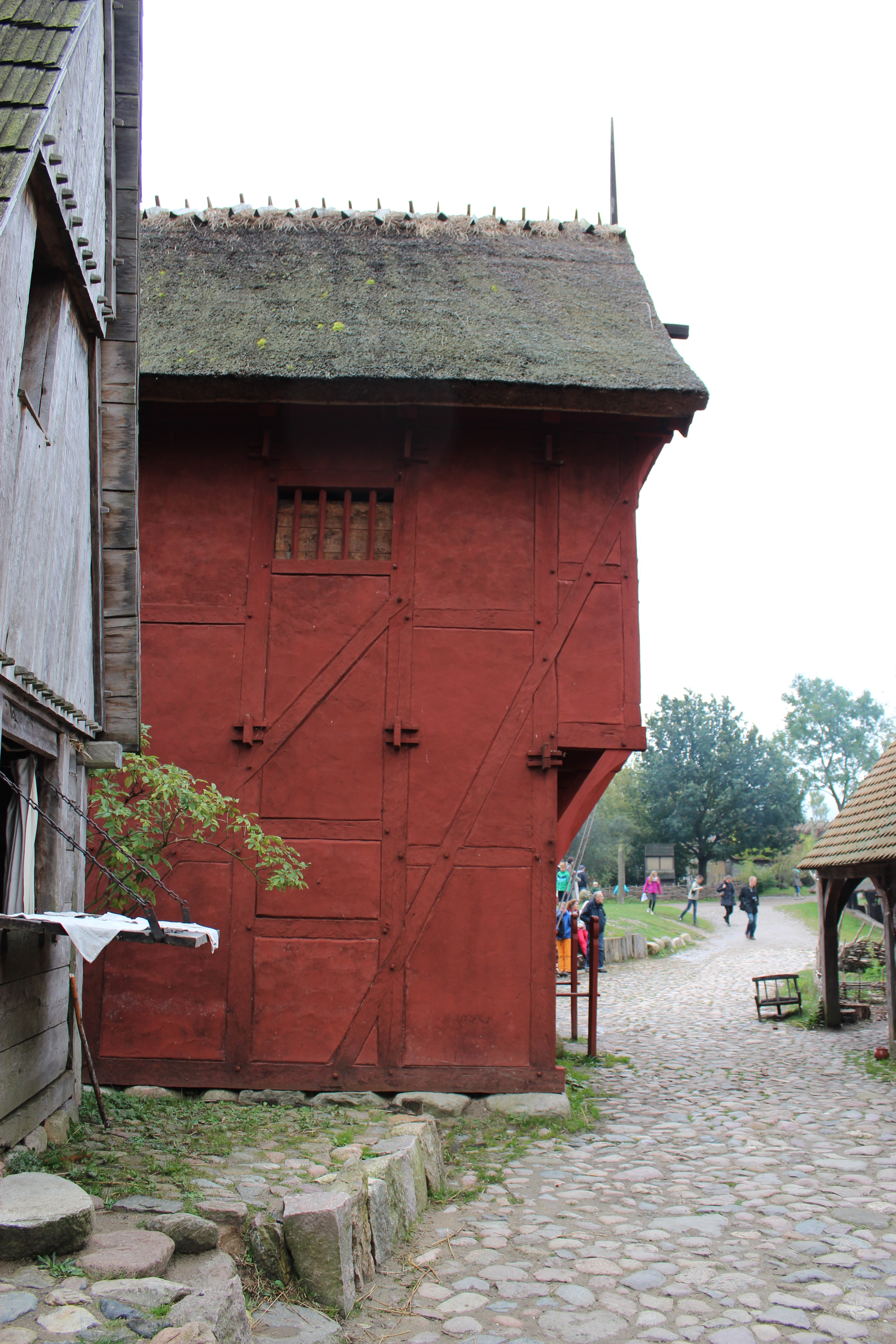
Timber-framed house

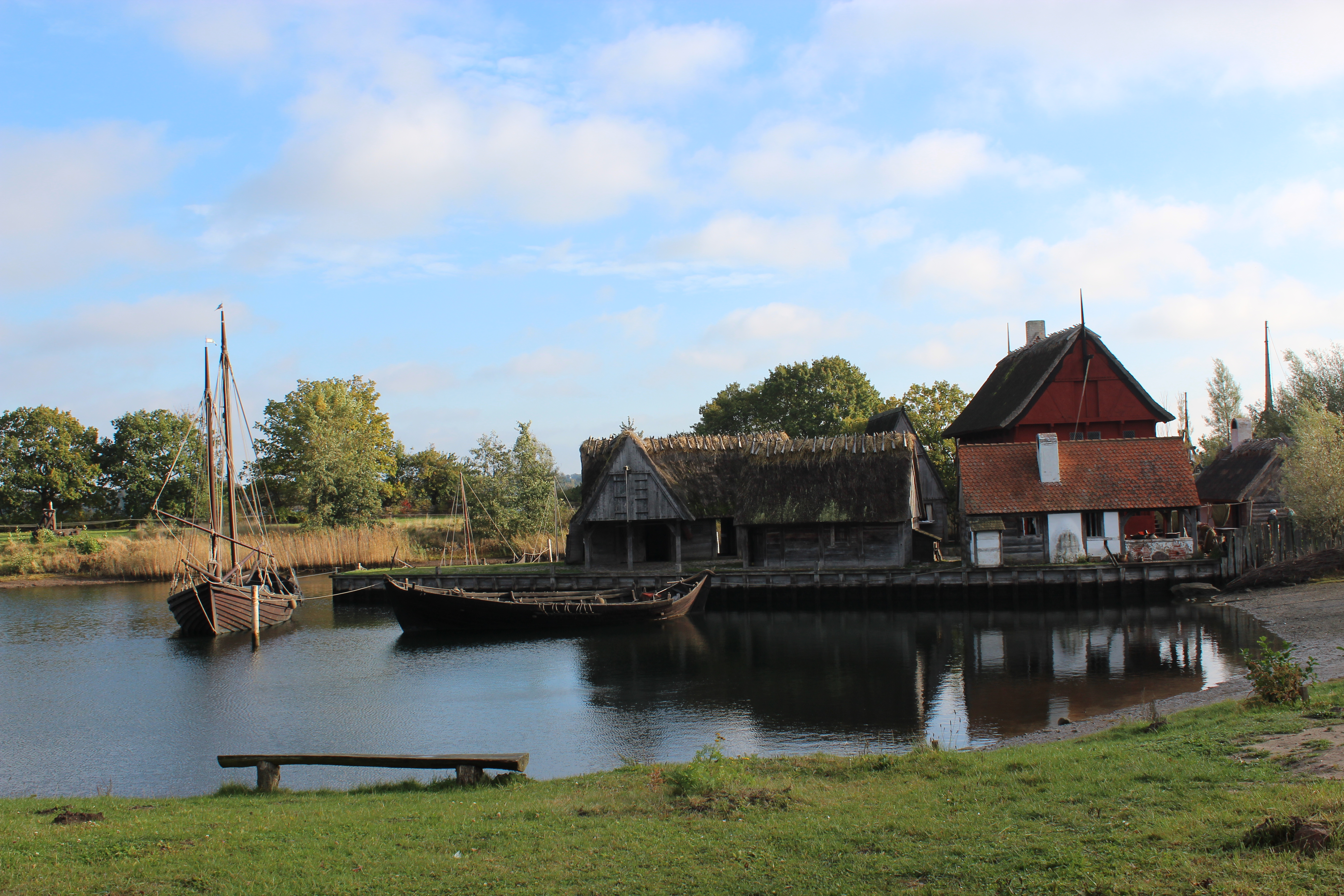
View at the harbour

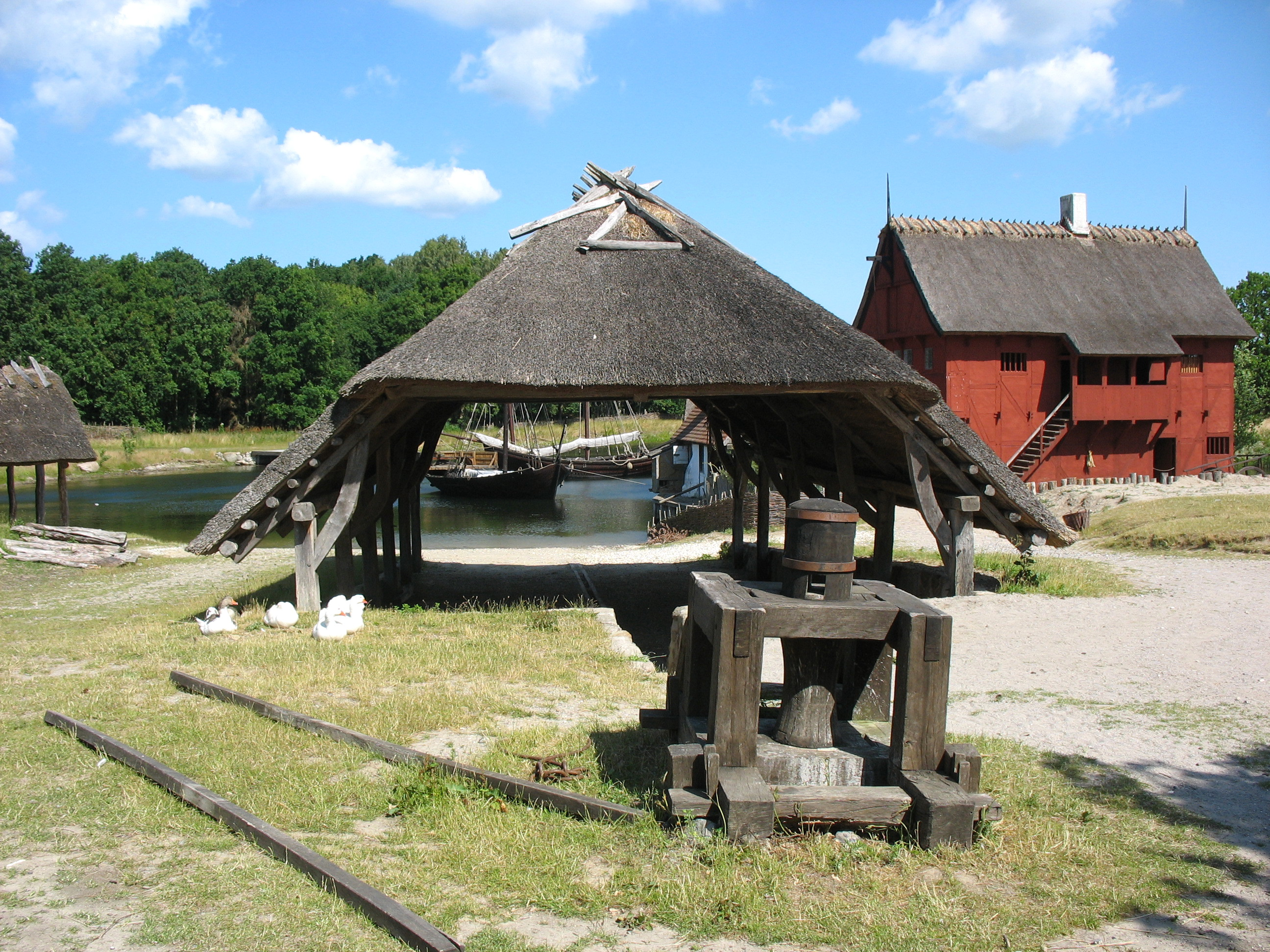
Boathouse

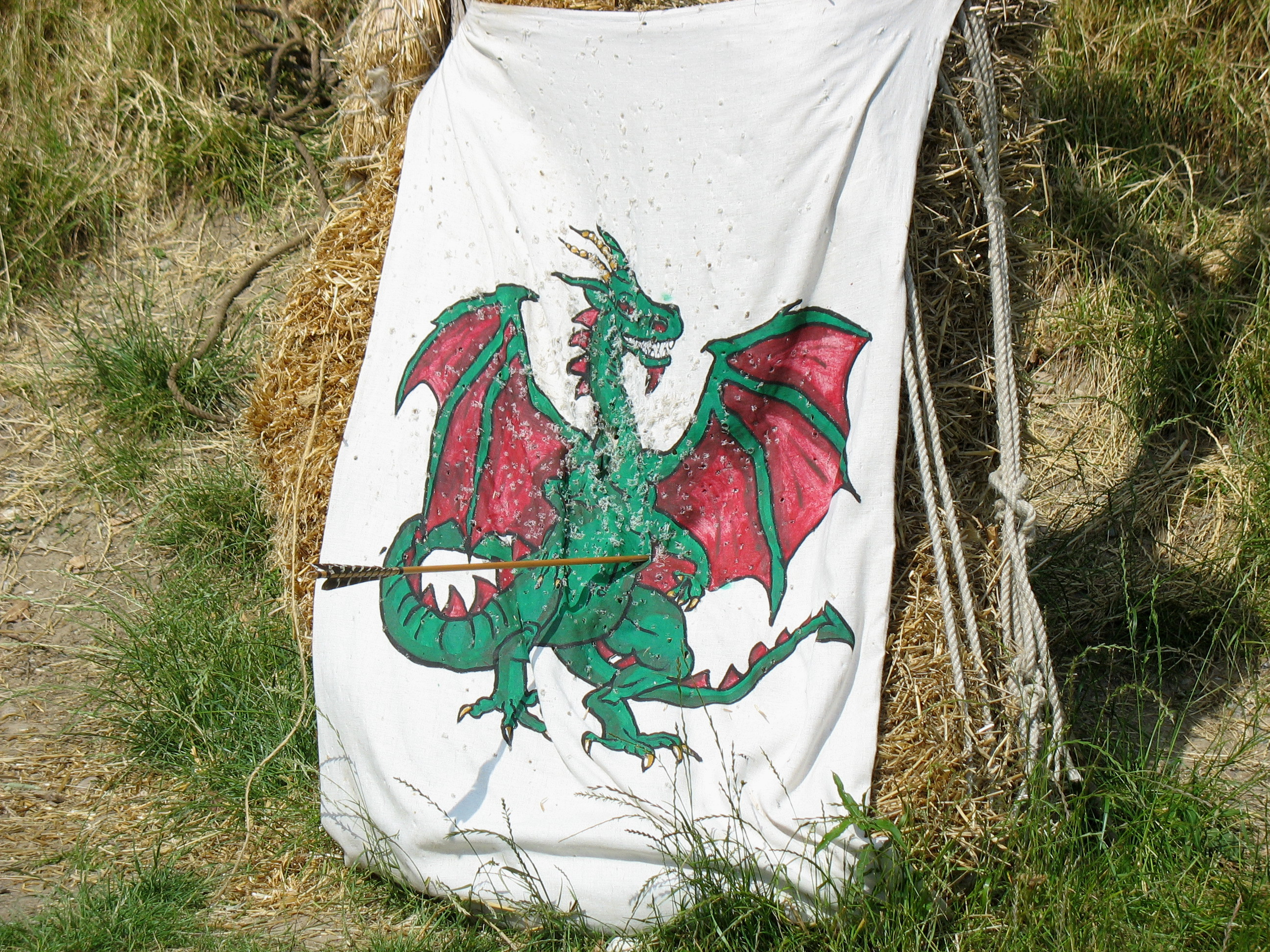
Target for archery

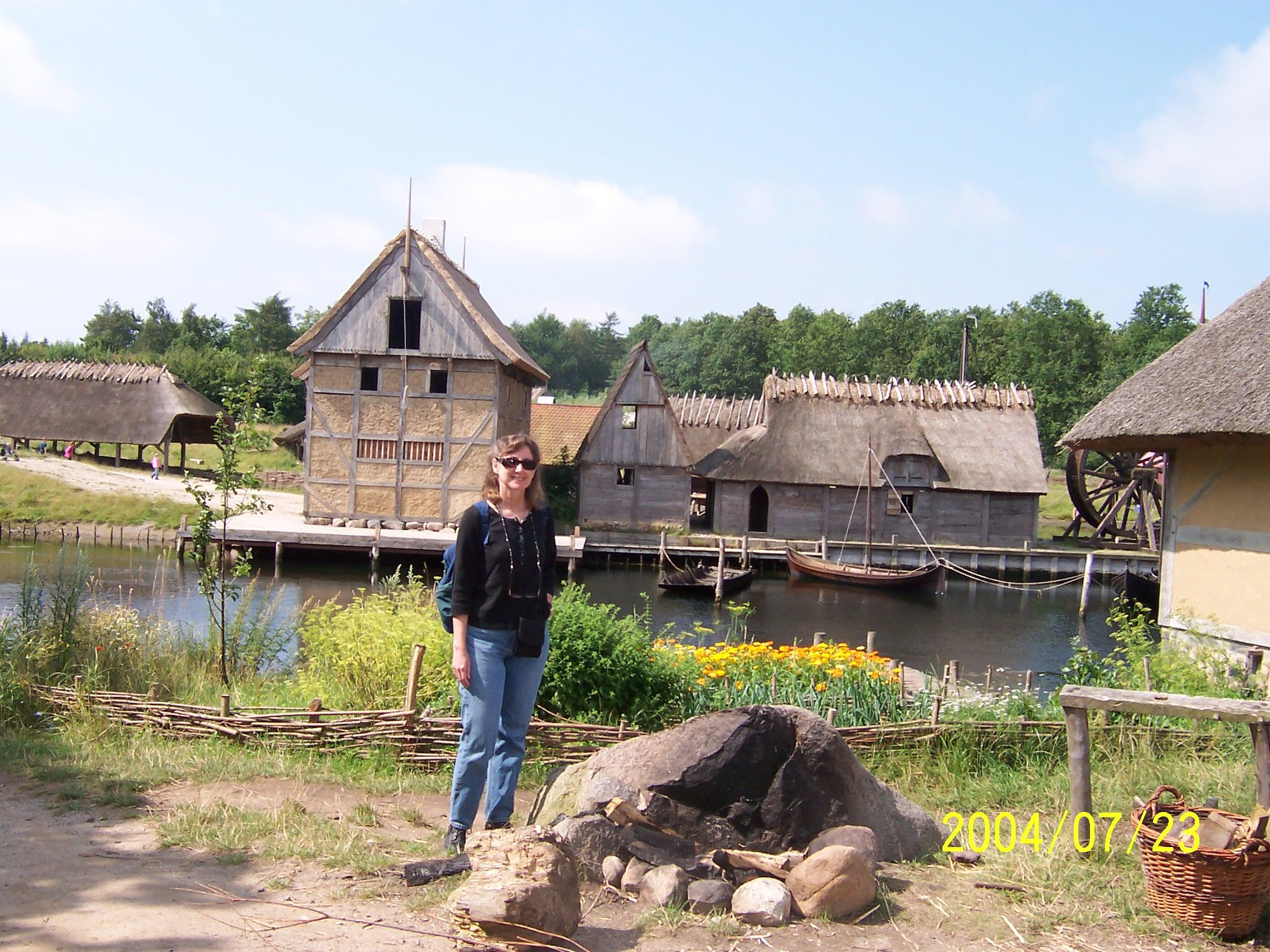
Tourist at The Middle Ages Center

== See also ==
- Archeon
- Frontier Culture Museum
