= Stephens Bros. Boat Builders =

Boat design company

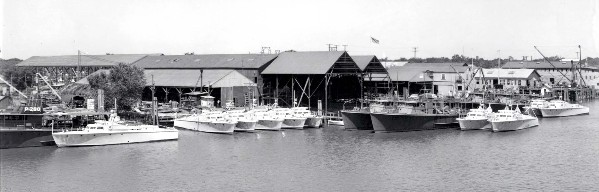
Stephens Bros. Boat Builders with 63-foot Crash boats in 1944

Stephens Brothers Boat Builders and Designers company (Stephens Bros.), an American boat designer, began in the back yard of brothers Theodore (Thod, 1882–1933) and Robert (Roy, 1884–1953) Stephens. Their boatbuilding firm in Stockton, California operated from 1902 to 1987. Over the years the company became famous for its elegantly designed pleasure craft, including sailboats, speedboats, cruisers and private yachts. Stephens Bros. also built many vessels for the U.S. military, especially during World War II. The company's first vessel was the sloop Dorothy, in 1902.

== History ==
=== 1902-1924 ===
Fred F. Lambourn, 28-foot (8.5 m) commercial runabout, 1911

The Dorothy displayed the brother’s craftsmanship, and a local businessman took notice and gave the brothers $1,000 in credit along with construction plans for a 25-foot (7.6 m) motor launch. By 1903 they completed the Gee Whiz, making it their first commissioned boat. Later that same year, the brothers built an even larger motor launch, the 50-foot (15 m) Queen. By now, their popularity and demand had outgrown their backyard construction site.

The brothers relocated their business to a partially submerged barge in the Stockton channel, giving them room to expand. From this new location, they were able to work year round and tackle projects of greater magnitude. One of their biggest challenges was learning to install the innovative gasoline engine into their boats. Luckily, Stockton’s Samson Iron Works, which manufactured these gasoline engines, was nearby and engineers from the company were available to answer questions and assist with installations.

During this time, Stockton was still predominantly a farming community. A sleek, quick craft was needed to transport commission merchants out to secure contracts with the farmers of the Delta islands west of Stockton. Such high demand for a speedy vessel gave rise to a new Stephens Bros. design, sometimes referred to as “spud-boats”, since potatoes were a Stockton agricultural staple. The most famous of these speedboats was the Fred F. Lambourn. Completed in 1912, this boat earned Stephens Brothers a praiseworthy reputation with its record-breaking speed.

=== 1925-1941 ===
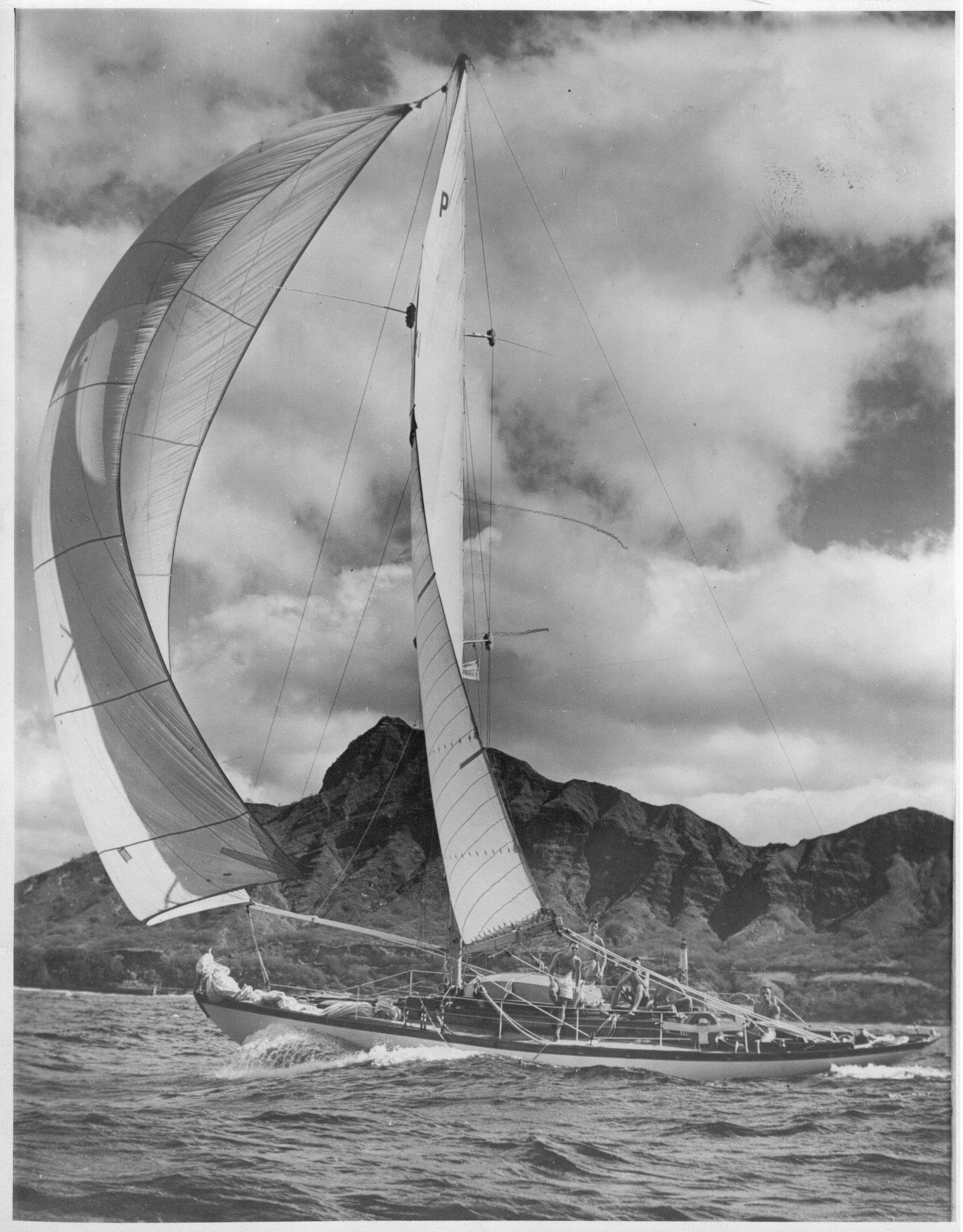
Paraja Stephens Bros., 44 foot cutter, late 1930s

As the city of Stockton grew, the use for boats as a means of transportation throughout the Delta gave way to the increasingly popular automobile. Needing to adapt, Stephens Bros. moved into the new field of pleasure craft as Americans became increasingly interested in boats for leisure activities. To keep up with their east coast competitors, Stephens Bros. introduced the 26-foot (7.9 m) runabout. Each of these was a work of art, hand-crafted out of teak, mahogany and white oak. In total, 38 of these boats were made between the years of 1925 and 1929.

The company was economically successful even during the Great Depression. East coast buyers were taking an interest in Stephens Bros'. new gasoline powered semi-stock cruisers that were smaller and more affordable than the previously built steam yachts.

In 1933, Thod Stephens died unexpectedly, leaving full management of the company to Roy. Despite this setback, the company went on to build a number of luxury and racing sailboats including the 44-foot (13 m) Pajara, and a small fleet of 38-foot (12 m) auxiliary sloops known as Farallone Clippers. In May 1938 the schooner JADA was built for Delbert Axelson. By the spring of 1941, production of all pleasure craft was halted as the company began a major contract with the U.S. military.

=== 1942-1945 ===
104-foot Air Rescue Boat, 1943

Even before the attack on Pearl Harbor, Stephens Bros. was building vessels for the U.S. government. The Navy’s Bureau of Ships and the U.S Coast Guard contracted the company to build wooden minesweepers that were used to remove magnetic mines or to protect slower ships from submarine torpedo attacks. At 136 feet (41 m), these were the largest vessels the company had ever built.

The company’s main contribution to the war effort was the Air-Sea Rescue Boat. Two types of these vessels were built, a 63-foot (19 m) and a 104-foot (32 m). With 12-cylinder engines, they were designed to race out to crash sites and rescue wounded men, and hence were also known as “crash boats.” By the end of the war in 1945, the company was able to stop production on military vessels and open its doors for more peaceful pursuits.

=== 1946-1966 ===
Westlake, 85-foot (26 m) raised-deck motor yacht, 1952

After successfully managing the company following his brother’s death, Roy Stephens decided to retire at the end of World War II. He turned the company over to his nephews, Theo, Barre and Dick Stephens. Stephens Bros. continued making semi-stock cruisers with their generic outside hulls and custom designed interiors. In the wake of the postwar economic boom, orders for more custom yachts increased. One of their more spectacular specimens was the Westlake. Built in 1952, this 85-foot (26 m) motor yacht was outfitted with a television in her main cabin.

By the end of the Korean War and the beginning of Cold War hostilities in 1953, Stephens Bros. again contracted with the military. The company built more minesweepers and rescue boats for the Air Force. However, only a quarter of the company’s production was set aside for military work.

Work continued on private vessels such as the famed 'Farallone Clippers' yachts, of which only 19 were built. By this time, Stephens Brothers had made such a name for themselves through build quality and level of craftsmanship that these yachts were reserved for wealthy clientele.

In 1960, the brothers sold the company to the Wrather Corporation, headed by entertainment industry mogul and Stephens Bros. boat collector, Jack Wrather, and the company name was changed to Stephens Marine, Inc.

However, this short-lived transaction proved to be a poor financial investment so the brothers bought the company back just three years later. Through the mid-1960s, the company continued to gain popularity, with more orders flowing in from the east coast. The most impressive of these was an 85-foot (26 m) yacht, Miss Budweiser, which was completed in 1962 for Anheuser-Busch in New York.

=== 1967-1987 ===
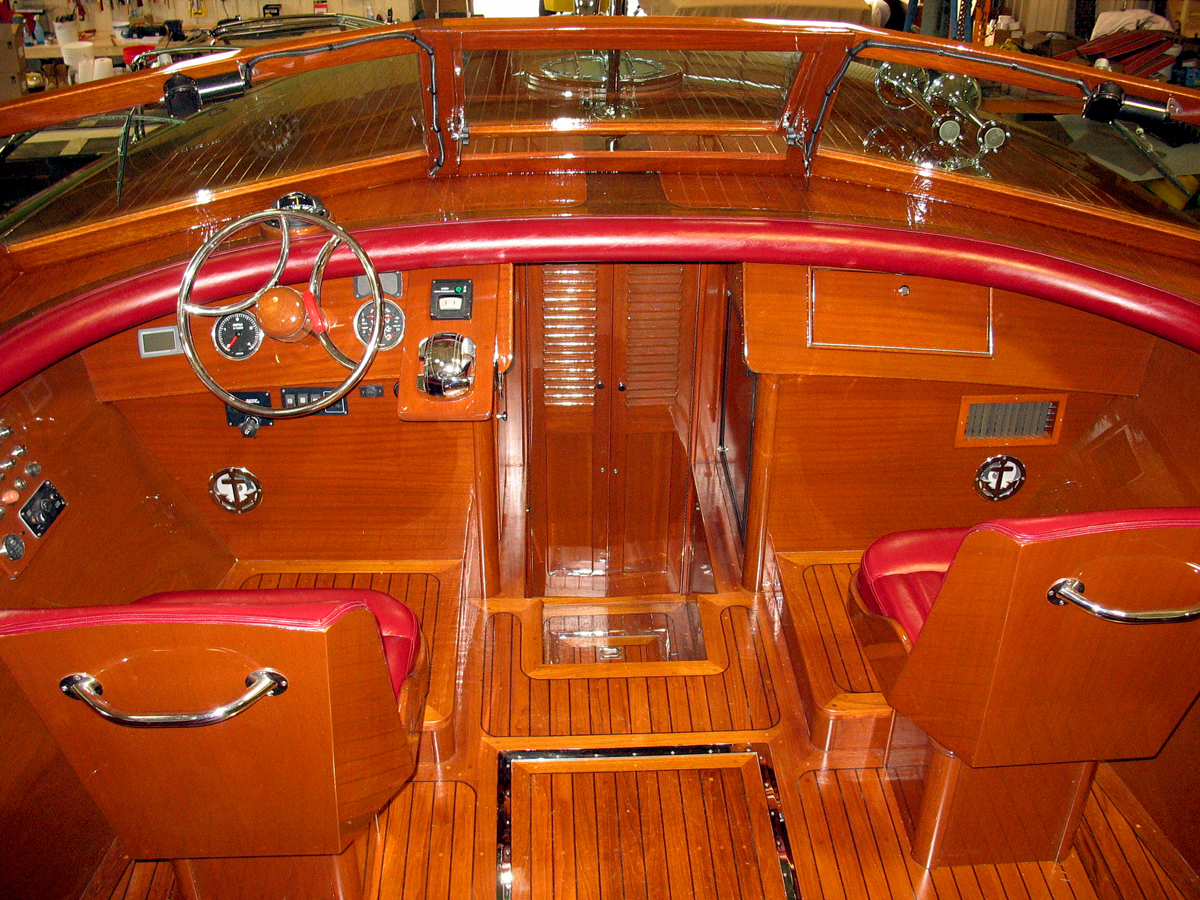
Sea Stag II, 38-foot (12 m), 1946 Restored by Mayea Boat & Aeroplane Works

Late into the 1960s, the boat building market underwent a transformation. New materials like aluminum and fiberglass were proving to be more durable and affordable. The demand shifted from wood to these materials; Stephens Bros. launched its last wooden boat in 1974.

From then, the company focused solely on yachts and sailing vessels, producing nothing less than 58-foot (18 m) in length. These large yachts were very expensive to build and, because of their size and intricacy, the company could not complete more than two a year. With rising expenses and a slowing market, Stephens Bros. was no longer financially viable, and closed down in the spring of 1987.

== Stephens Bros. boats today ==
Today, Stephens Bros. boats are highly prized as collector's items. Stephens Bros. boat owners meet every year at the Stephens Rendezvous, organized by the Northern California Fleet of the Classic Yacht Association, to show off these beautiful vessels.

A collection of Stephens Bros. documents, photographs and original drawings are available to the public in the archives of The Haggin Museum in the brothers’ hometown of Stockton, California. The museum displays a fully restored 1927 26-foot runabout to commemorate the company and its legacy. Stephens Bros. Boat Builders is on the deepwater port on the Stockton Ship Channel of the Pacific Ocean and an inland port located more than seventy nautical miles from the ocean, on the Stockton Channel and San Joaquin River-Stockton Deepwater Shipping Channel (before it joins the Sacramento River to empty into Suisun Bay.

== Vessels built ==
- USS MSC-257
