= Guldborgsund Bridge =

Bridge in Denmark

Coordinates: 54°52′16″N 11°44′54″E

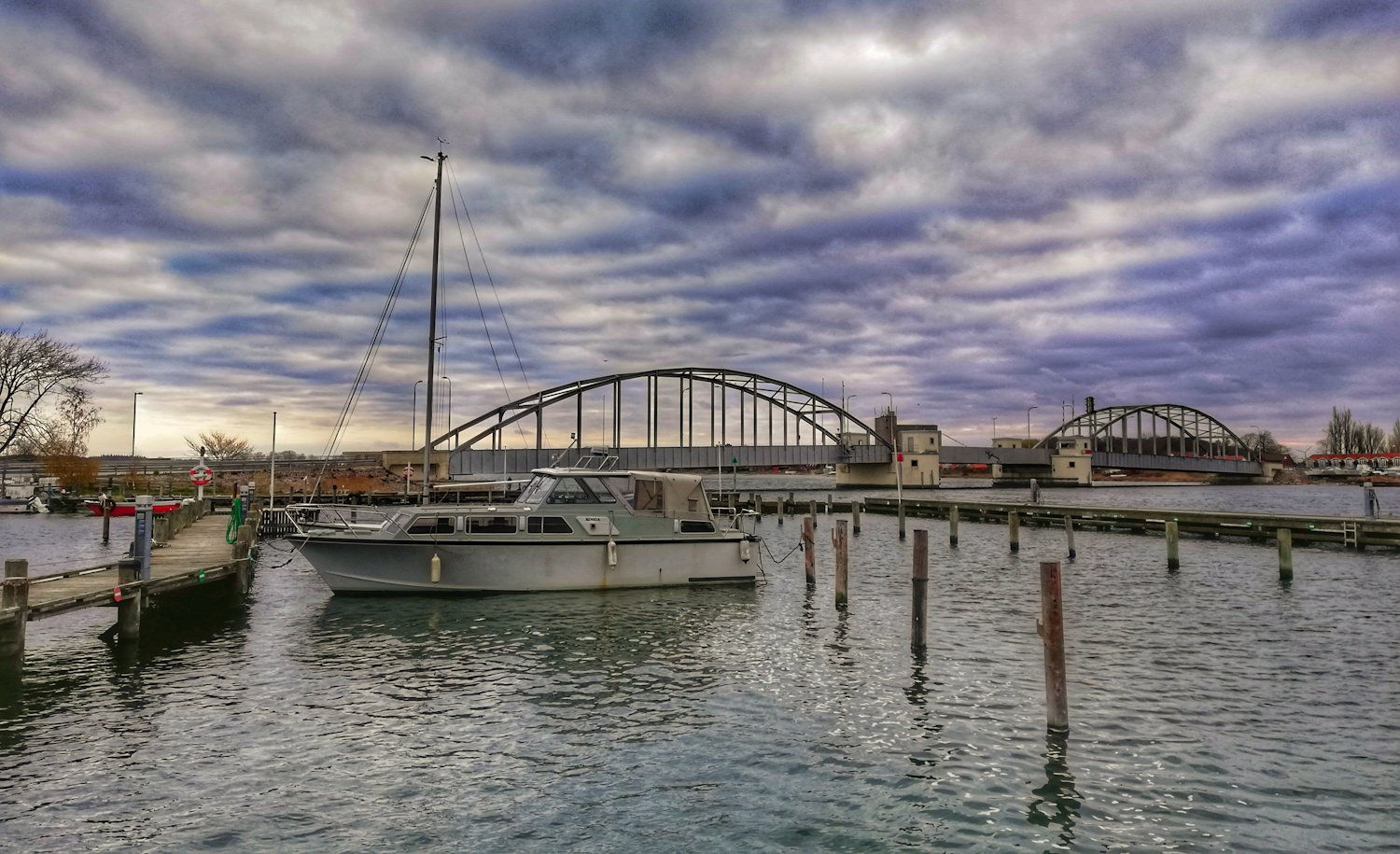
Guldborgsund Bridge

Guldborgsund Bridge (Danish: Guldborgbroen) spans the northern end of the Guldborgsund, between the islands of Lolland and Falster in Denmark. The bridge consists of two steel-arched spans with a 30m central opening section featuring two rising bascules. It was built in 1933 and 1934, is 180m long and 7m wide, carrying two road carriageways, and was officially opened by Prince Axel of Denmark on 6 October 1934.

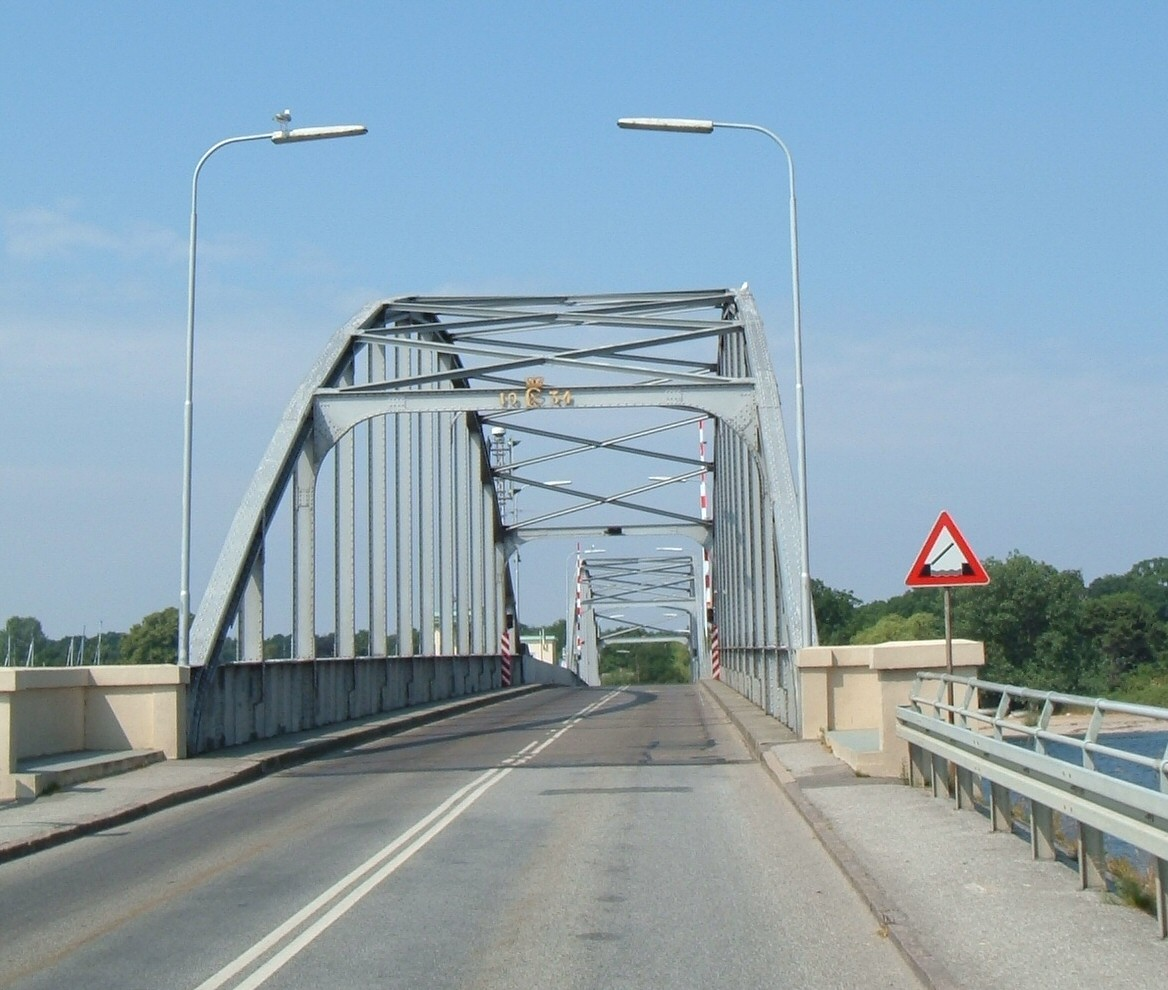
View of bridge deck

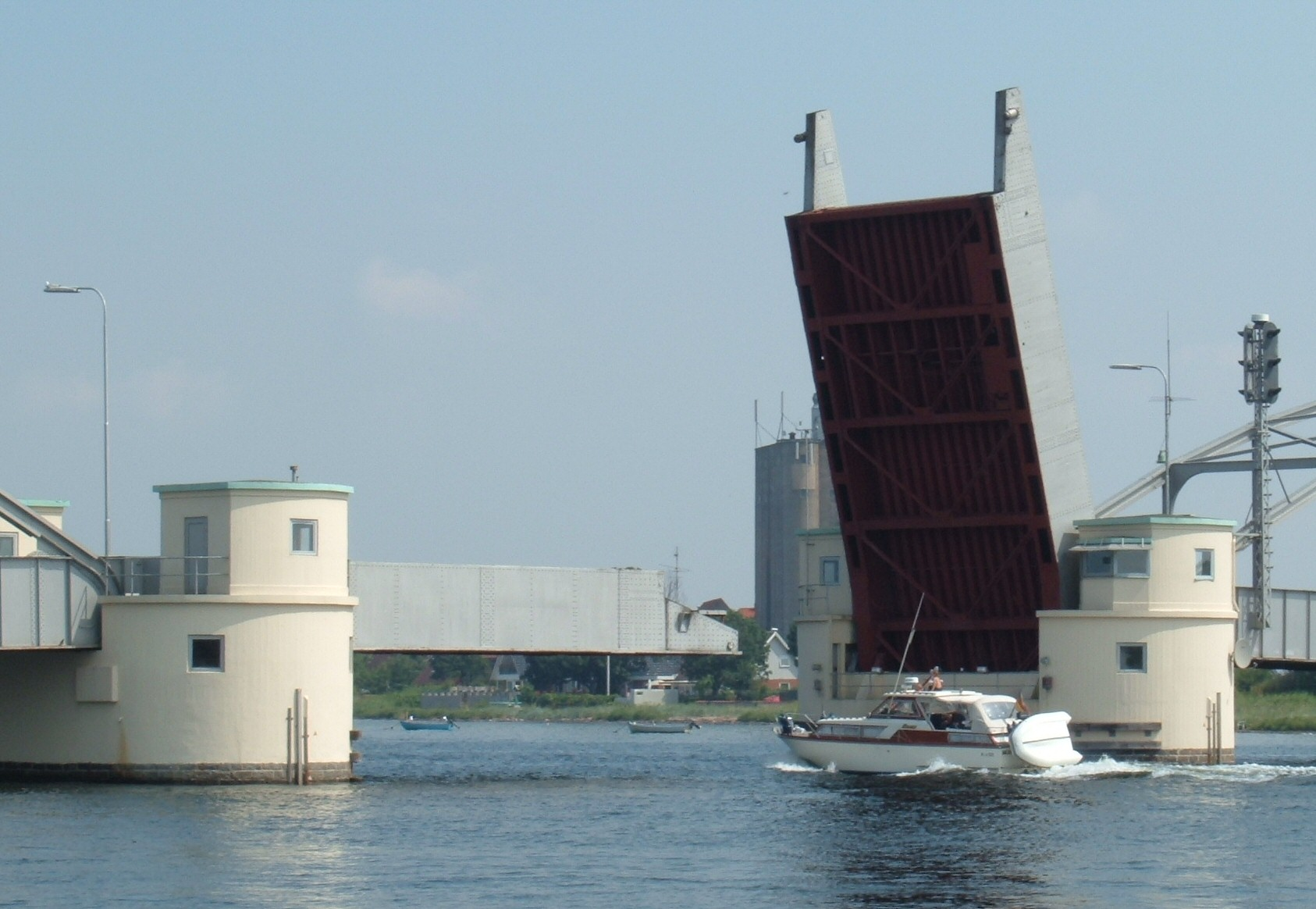
The bridge with one bascule open
