= Sundby, Lolland =

Town in Denmark

Coordinates: 54.76559°N 11.85236°E

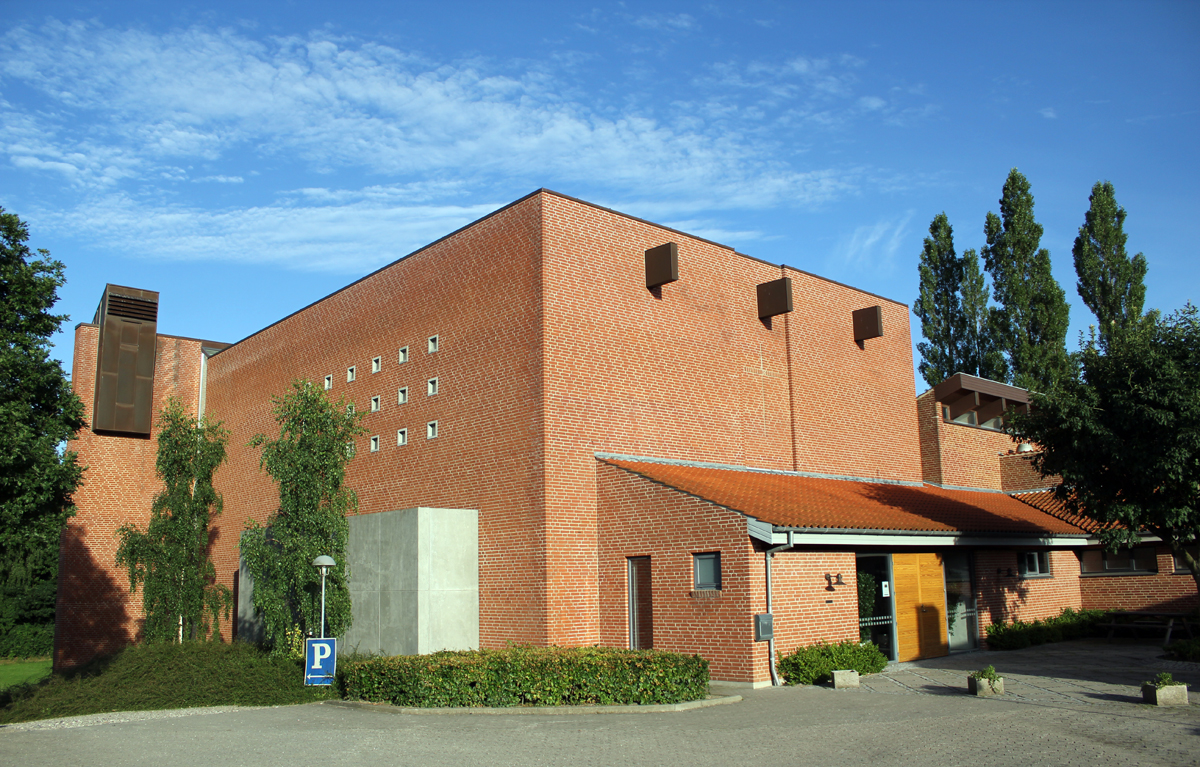
Sundkirken, the church in Sundby

Sundby (Danish pronunciation: [ˈsɔnˌpyˀ]) is a town with a population of 3,236 (1 January 2026) on the east coast of the Danish island of Lolland located at the western shore of Guldborgsund just opposite the town of Nykøbing Falster on Falster. It formed the western part of the now former Nykøbing Falster municipality before the municipal mergers 1 January 2007. Since 1 January 2007, the town is a part of Guldborgsund Municipality in Region Zealand.

The main attraction of Sundby and Nykøbing Falster is Middelaldercentret (The Medieval Centre), an experimental living history museum, located at the shore of Guldborgsund just north of the town.
