= Rudkøbing Municipality =

Rudkøbing Municipality Rudkøbing Kommune
- Former municipality
- Coat of arms

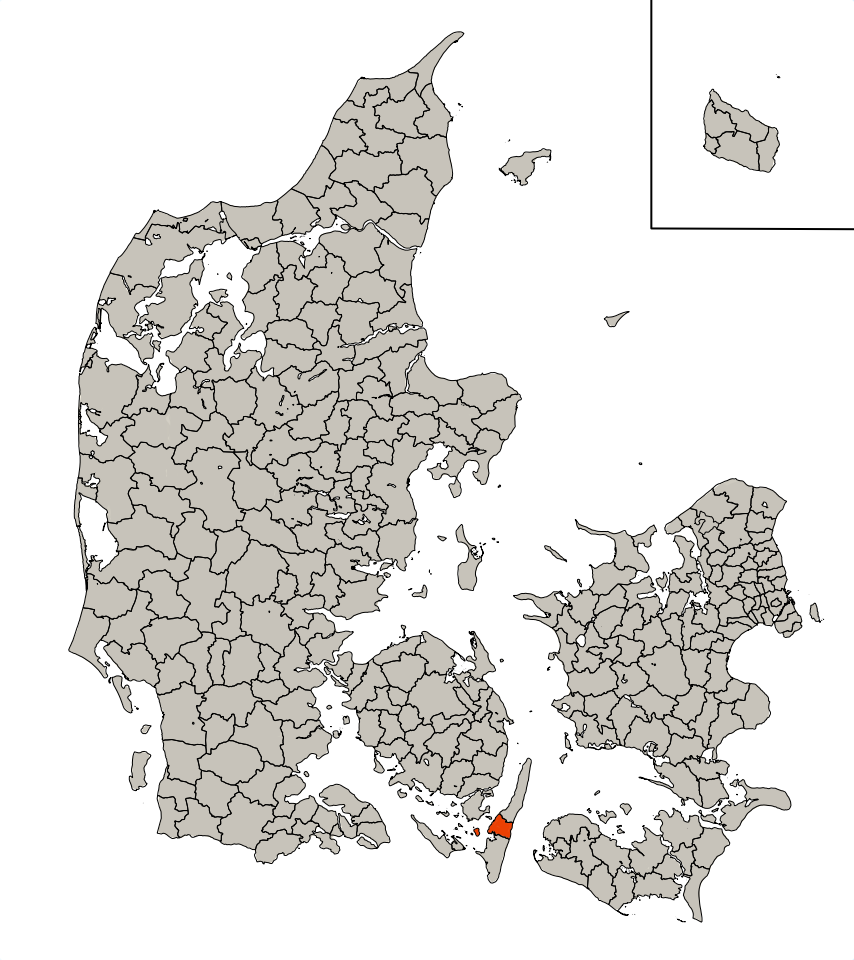
- Country: Denmark
- County: Funen
- Established: 1 April 1970
- Dissolved: 31 December 2006
- Seat: Rudkøbing

Government
  - Last mayor: Johan Norden (A)

Area
  - Total: 62.94 km^{2} (24.30 sq mi)

Population (2006)
  - Total: 6,647
  - Density: 105.6/km^{2} (273.5/sq mi)
- Time zone: UTC1 (CET)
  - Summer (DST): UTC2 (CEST)
- Municipal code: 475

Until 1 January 2007 Rudkøbing Municipality was a municipality (Danish: kommune) in the former Funen County, on the central parts of the island of Langeland. It also included the islands of Strynø, Strynø Kalv and a number of small uninhabited islands. The municipality covered an area of 62.94 km^{2}, and had a total population of 6,647 (2006). Its last mayor was Johan Norden, a member of the Social Democrats political party.

Rudkøbing Municipality bordered Sydlangeland Municipality to the south and Tranekær Municipality to the north and west, connecting to Siø through the Langeland Bridge.

The municipality ceased to exist as the result of Kommunalreformen 2007 (the Municipality Reform of 2007). It was merged with the Sydlangeland and Tranekær municipalities to form the new Langeland municipality. The new municipality belongs to the Region of Southern Denmark.

== History ==
The town of Rudkøbing was granted market town rights in the 1200s, though struggled to compete with the numerous illegal trade ports around the island. During the Northern Wars in the middle of the 1600s, Rudkøbing was occupied by the Swedes. The occupation hurt the already struggling town, and the population dwindled. In the later parts of the 1700s the town began to recover, and during the industrialization the town and the island grew in population and activity. A new harbour was constructed in Rudkøbing in 1847, and the roads of the island were improved. Steamboat routes to Copenhagen, Svendborg and Ærø were established, and the population of Rudkøbing was tripled during the 1800s.

In the Middle Ages, when Denmark was divided into hundreds, Langeland was divided into two hundreds. These were Langeland's Northern Hundred (Danish: Langelands Nørre Herred) and Langeland's Southern Hundred (Danish: Langelands Sønder Herred), the latter also including the island of Siø. The island of Strynø was part of Sunds Hundred, which encompassed Svendborg and the town's surrounding area, as well as numerous islands in the South Funen Archipelago. The two hundreds on Langeland were part of the fief (Danish: len) of Tranekær Fief, which became Tranekær County in 1662. Sunds Hundred, with Strynø, meanwhile became a part of Nyborg County. In 1793 the two counties of Tranekær and Nyborg were merged to form Svendborg County, which was merged with Odense County in 1970 to form Funen County (Danish: Fyns Amt). This county was dissolved in 2007, and the entirety of Funen County became a part of the Region of Southern Denmark.

In 1842 Denmark was divided into smaller administrative divisions, namely parish municipalities (Danish: sognekommunner). The borders of these municipalities were largely based on the country's parishes. In the 1970 municipal reform these parish municipalities were dissolved. Five parish municipalities had merged already in 1966 to form Rudkøbing Parish Municipality, which then became Rudkøbing Municipality in 1970. This municipality lasted until 2007 when it was merged with the municipalities of Sydlangeland and Tranekær.

=== Historical divisions ===
Historical municipal divisions of Langeland Municipality
2007	1970	1966	1842	1838	1200	Towns
Langeland Mun.	Rudkøbing Mun.	Rudkøbing Parish Mun.	Rudkøbing Market Town Mun.		Rudkøbing Market Town	Rudkøbing
Langeland Mun.	Rudkøbing Mun.	Rudkøbing Parish Mun.	Simmerbølle Parish Mun.			Simmerbølle
Langeland Mun.	Rudkøbing Mun.	Rudkøbing Parish Mun.	Skrøbelev Parish Mun.			Gammel Skrøbelev
Langeland Mun.	Rudkøbing Mun.	Rudkøbing Parish Mun.	Longelse-Fuglsbølle Parish Mun.			Spodsbjerg
Langeland Mun.	Rudkøbing Mun.	Rudkøbing Parish Mun.	Strynø Parish Mun.			Strynø By
Langeland Mun.	Tranekær Mun.					
Langeland Mun.	Sydlangeland Mun.					

== Towns ==
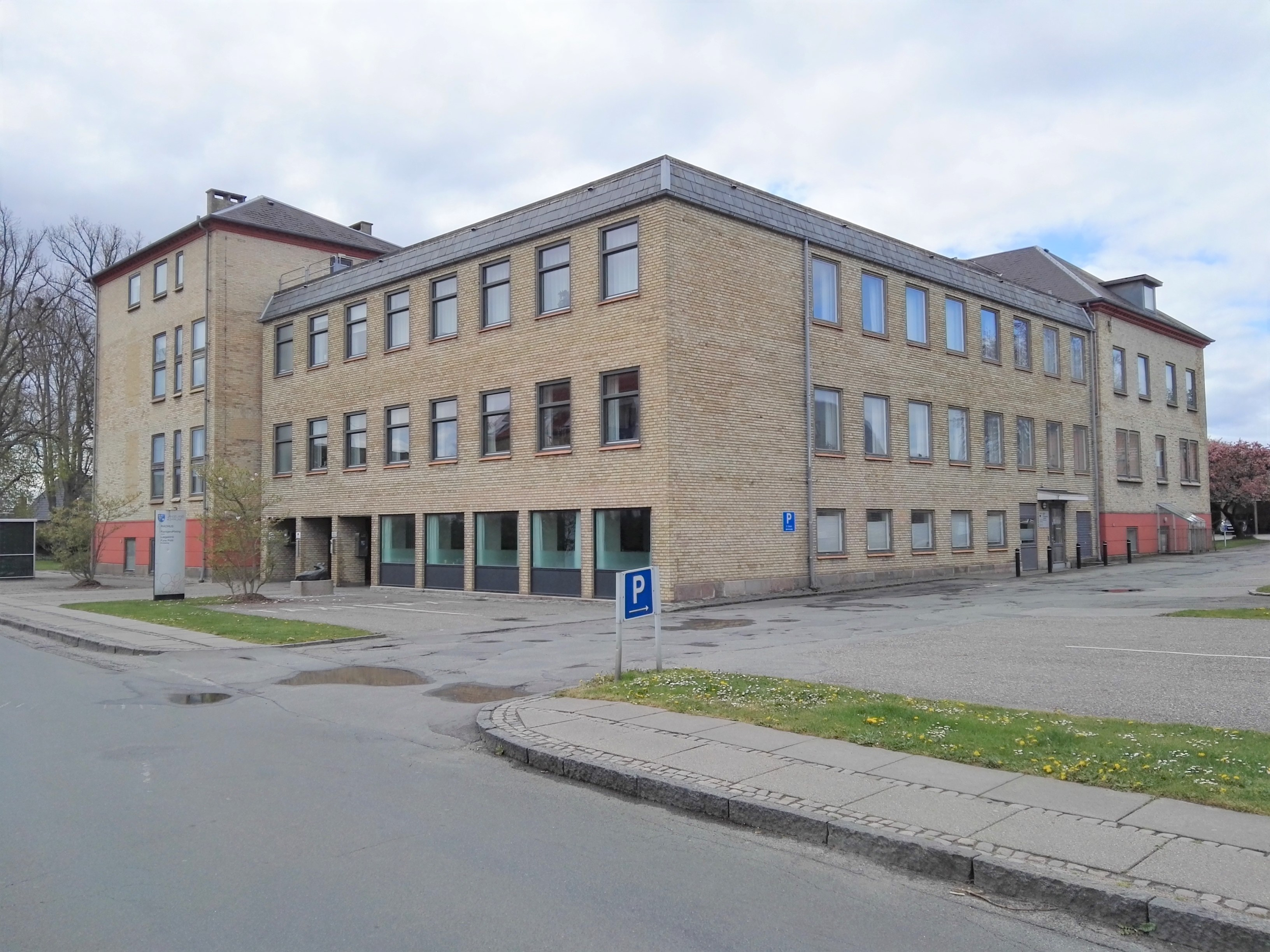
City hall in Rudkøbing. Today used as city hall for Langeland Municipality.

Approximately 70% of the municipality's population lived in the city of Rudkøbing, with the remainder living in rural areas. Smaller villages in the municipality include Spodsbjerg, Fuglsbølle and Ny Skrøbelev.

Rudkøbing was located in the western part of the municipality.

The municipality also included the island of Strynø. The only settlement on the island is called Strynø By. This village is located centrally on the island, and houses the island's attractions and facilities. It connects to the ferry harbour through a short road. In Strynø By is Strynø Church.

Below is the population from 2006 of the one larger settlement of the municipality, namely Rudkøbing.

Rudkøbing	4,717

== Politics ==
=== Municipal council ===
Below are the municipal council elected since the municipality's creation in 1970 and until 2001, which was the last election before the municipality was dissolved.

Election	Party							Total seats	Elected mayor
Election	A	B	C	F	V	Z	...	Total seats	Elected mayor
1970	9	2	2		4			17	Svend Nielsson (A)
1974	8	2	1		4	1	1	17	Svend Nielsson (A)
1978	7	2	1	1	4	1	1	17	Axel Rasmussen (V)
1981	7	1	1	1	7			17	Axel Rasmussen (V)
1985	7	1	1	2	6			17	Tonny Juul Pedersen (A)
1989	7	1		2	6		1	17	Tonny Juul Pedersen (A)
1993	9	1		1	6			17	Tonny Juul Pedersen (A)
1997	7			3	5		2	17	Tonny Juul Pedersen (A)
2001	5			4	6		2	17	Johan Norden (A)
Data from Statistikbanken.dk and editions of Kommunal Aarbog

=== Mayors ===
Since the creation of the municipality in 1970 and until it was dissolved in 2007, the mayors of Rudkøbing Municipality were:

#	Mayor	Party	Term
1	Svend Nielsson	Social Democrats	1970-1978
2	Axel Rasmussen	Venstre	1978-1986
3	Tonny Juul Pedersen	Social Democrats	1986-2002
4	Johan Norden	Social Democrats	2002-2007

== Parishes ==
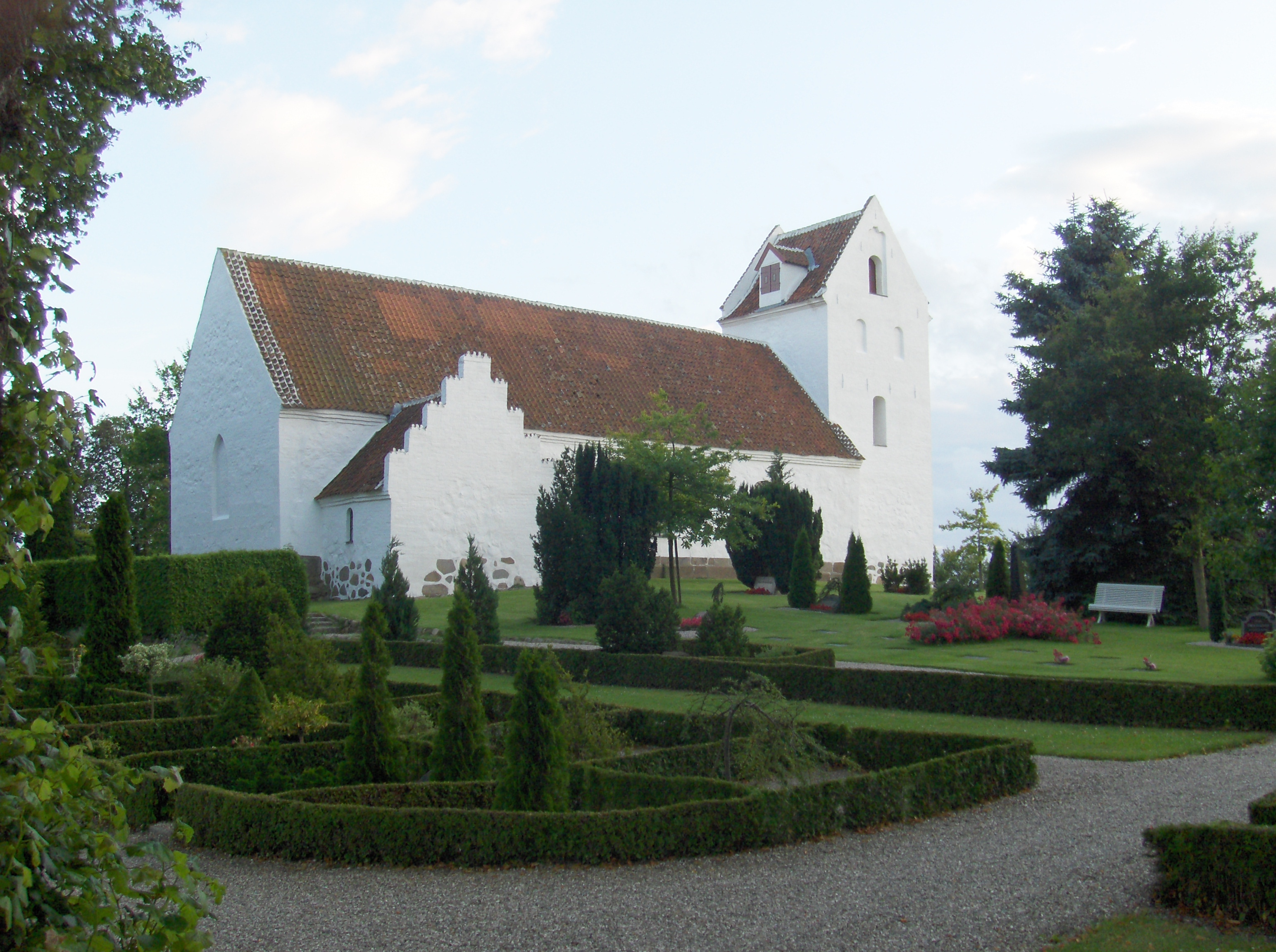
Longelse Church

The municipality consisted of six parishes and six churches.

- Fuglsbølle Parish (Fuglsbølle Church)
- Longelse Parish (Longelse Church)
- Rudkøbing Parish (Rudkøbing Church)
- Simmerbølle Parish (Simmerbølle Church)
- Skrøbelev Parish (Skrøbelev Church)
- Strynø Parish (Strynø Church)

== Symbols ==
Rudkøbing Municipality's coat of arms was three blue fish on a white background.
