= Marianne Schroll =

Danish specialist in geriatric medicine

Marianne Schroll née Bruun (born 1942) is a Danish specialist in geriatric medicine. As head of the Danish Geriatrics Society (Dansk Selskab for Geriatri) from 1986 to 1992, she has played a key role in promoting interest in the ailments of elderly people. Until her retirement in 2007, she was Professor of Geriatrics at the University of Copenhagen and principal specialist in geriatrics at Bispebjerg Hospital. An active participant in international cooperation, she was honoured as an interRAI Fellow in 1991.

== Biography ==
Born on 4 January 1942 in Rudkøbing on the island of Langeland, Marianne Bruun is the daughter of Alfred Johannes Bruun, a schoolteacher, and Karen Marie Nielsen, a nurse. An only child, she was brought up on Langeland but attended high school at Svendborg on Funen where she met Gustav Schroll whom she married in 1965. Thanks to outstanding marks in her school leaving exams, she received a scholarship which enabled her to study medicine at Aarhus University, graduating in 1968. In 1968, she gave birth to her first child, Kirsten, followed by Bodil (1970), Anders Ditlev (1972) and Marie Elisabeth (1975).

Schroll's first appointment was in the United States as a researcher at Stanford University's Department of Cardiology. In 1970, she served as a substitute physician at Frederiksborg County's Central Hospital in Hillerød. Thereafter, she developed her experience by working in several different medical departments in the Copenhagen area, leading to special recognition of her competence in internal medicine in 1977. During this period, she received several research scholarships which led to her increasing interest in undertaking research on ailments of the elderly, later known as geriatrics. In 1982, she was appointed as a specialist in the geriatric department of Roskilde County Hospital. That year, at the University of Copenhagen, she defended her thesis titled A Ten-Year Prospective Study, 1964–1974, of Cardiovascular Risk Factors in Men and Women from the Glostrup Population, Born in 1914.

Schroll's research and her promotion of dissertations and doctoral theses have provided significant support for improving the understanding of the physical and mental requirements of older people, This has been reflected in her international contributions, including leadership of the World Health Organization's MONICA project on cardiovascular diseases (1982–1992). She was president of the 11th Nordic Gerontology Congress (1992) and the Second European Congress on Nutrition and Health in the Elderly (1996). In 1991, she was honoured as an interRAI Fellow after participating in European Congress of Gerontology in Madrid. She has also served on the board of Danmarks Statistik (1991–1998) and on the Interministerial Committee on Research into the Elderly (1997–1999).

== Selected publications ==
Marianne Schroll has written a number of influential articles and books, often directed at the general public. Some have appeared or been translated into English.

- 1982: Schroll, Marianne: A ten-year prospective study, 1964-1974, of cardiovascular risk factors in men and women from the Glostrup population born in 1914
- 1989: Schroll, Marianne: Helbred (Health)
- 1998: Kirk, Henning; Schroll, Marianne: Viden om aldring : veje til handling (Knowledge about Ageing: Types of Treatment)

A comprehensive list of her contributions to research papers is available from ResearchGate.
