= Sydlangeland Municipality =

Sydlangeland Municipality Sydlangeland Kommune
- Former municipality
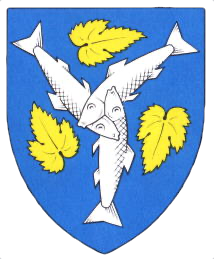
- Coat of arms

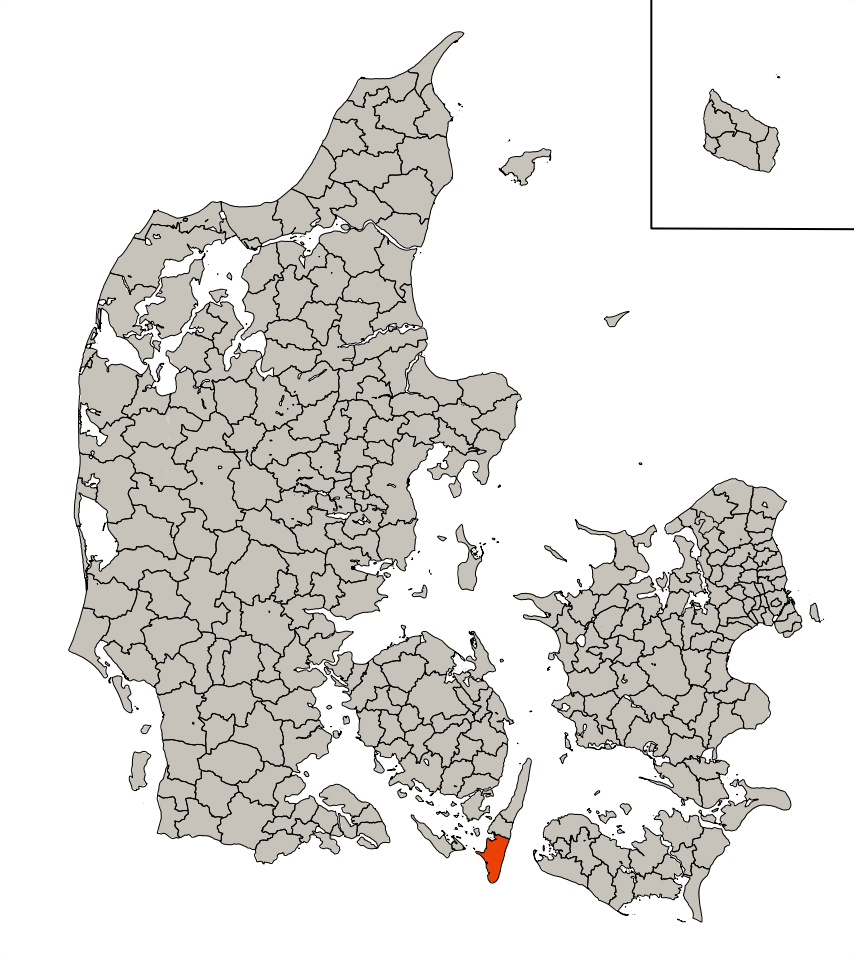
- Country: Denmark
- County: Funen
- Established: 1 April 1970
- Dissolved: 31 December 2006
- Seat: Humble

Government
  - Last mayor: Knud Gether (local party)

Area
  - Total: 120.82 km^{2} (46.65 sq mi)

Population (2006)
  - Total: 4,034
  - Density: 33.39/km^{2} (86.48/sq mi)
- Time zone: UTC1 (CET)
  - Summer (DST): UTC2 (CEST)
- Municipal code: 481

Until 1 January 2007 Sydlangeland Municipality was a municipality (Danish: kommune) in the former Funen County, on the southern parts of the island of Langeland. It also included the inhabited islands of Lindø and Langø, as well as a number of smaller uninhabited islands. The municipality covered an area of 120.82 km^{2}, and had a total population of 4,034 (2006). Its last mayor was Knud Gether, a member of a local political party.

Sydlangeland Municipality bordered Rudkøbing Municipality to the north. Across a small strait to the west was Marstal Municipality, later Ærø Municipality.

The municipality ceased to exist as the result of Kommunalreformen 2007 (the Municipality Reform of 2007). It was merged with the Tranekær and Rudkøbing municipalities to form the new Langeland municipality. The new municipality belongs to the Region of Southern Denmark.

== History ==
In the Middle Ages, when Denmark was divided into hundreds, Langeland was divided into two hundreds. These were Langeland's Northern Hundred (Danish: Langelands Nørre Herred) and Langeland's Southern Hundred (Danish: Langelands Sønder Herred), the latter also including the island of Siø. The two hundreds on Langeland were part of the fief (Danish: len) of Tranekær Fief, which became Tranekær County in 1662. In 1793 the two counties of Tranekær and Nyborg were merged to form Svendborg County, which was merged with Odense County in 1970 to form Funen County (Danish: Fyns Amt). This county was dissolved in 2007, and the entirety of Funen County became a part of the Region of Southern Denmark.

In 1842 Denmark was divided into smaller administrative divisions, namely parish municipalities (Danish: sognekommunner). The borders of these municipalities were largely based on the country's parishes. In the 1970 municipal reform these parish municipalities were dissolved. Four parish municipalities had merged already in 1966 to form Sydlangeland Parish Municipality, which then became Sydlangeland Municipality in 1970. This municipality lasted until 2007 when it was merged with the municipalities of Tranekær and Rudkøbing.

=== Historical divisions ===
Historical municipal divisions of Langeland Municipality
2007	1970	1966	1842	Towns
Langeland Mun.	Sydlangeland Mun.	Sydlangeland Parish Mun.	Lindelse Parish Mun.	Lindelse
Langeland Mun.	Sydlangeland Mun.	Sydlangeland Parish Mun.	Humble Parish Mun.	Humble
Langeland Mun.	Sydlangeland Mun.	Sydlangeland Parish Mun.	Tryggelev-Fodslette Parish Mun.	Tryggelev
Langeland Mun.	Sydlangeland Mun.	Sydlangeland Parish Mun.	Magleby Parish Mun.	Bagenkop
Langeland Mun.	Rudkøbing Mun.			
Langeland Mun.	Tranekær Mun.			

== Towns ==
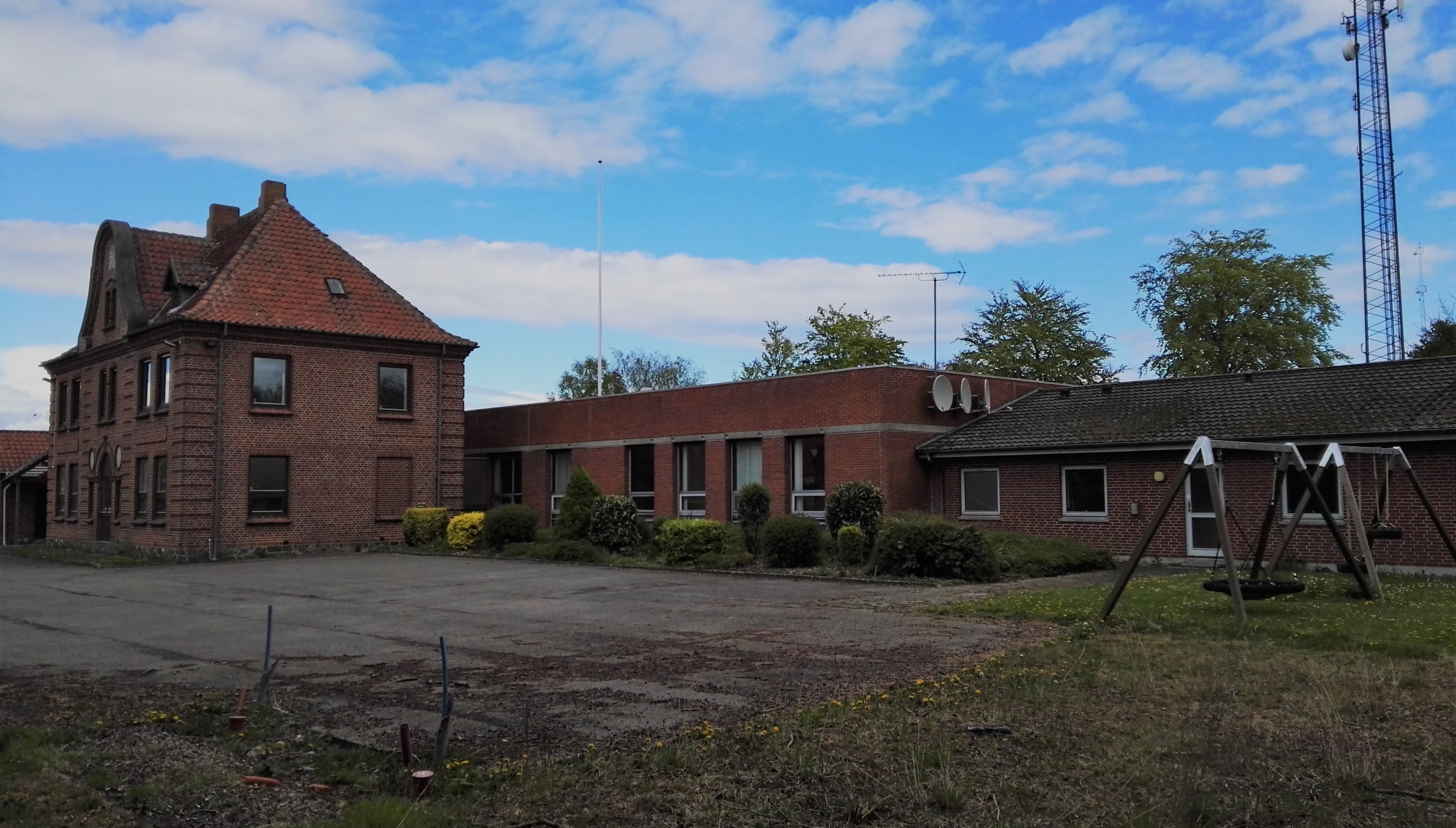
Former city hall in Humble.

Approximately 55% of the municipality's population lived in rural areas or smaller villages. The municipalities two largest towns, Humble and Bagenkop, were each home to around 15% of the municipality's population. The remaining population lived in Lindelse and Tryggelev.

Humble was the seat of the municipality. The town was located centrally in the municipality.

Below is the populations from 2006 of the four larger settlements of the municipality.

Humble	673
Bagenkop	577
Lindelse	369
Tryggelev	218

== Politics ==
=== Municipal council ===
Below are the municipal council elected since the municipality's creation in 1970 and until 2001, which was the last election before the municipality was dissolved.

Election	Party							Total seats	Elected mayor
Election	A	B	C	F	V	Z	...	Total seats	Elected mayor
1970	4	5			6			15	Arne Larsen (V)
1974	4	3	1		6	1		15	Arne Larsen (V)
1978	5	3			6	1		15	Arne Larsen (V)
1981	4	2			8	1		15	Arne Larsen (V)
1985	4	2	1	1	7			15	Arne Larsen (V)
1989	3	2		1	7			13	Helge Larsen (V)
1993	2	1	1	1	4		4	13	Knud Gether (...)
1997	3	1			3		6	13	Knud Gether (...)
2001	1	1			3		8	13	Knud Gether (...)
Data from Statistikbanken.dk and editions of Kommunal Aarbog

=== Mayors ===
Since the creation of the municipality in 1970 and until it was dissolved in 2007, the mayors of Sydlangeland Municipality were:

#	Mayor	Party	Term
1	Arne Larsen	Venstre	1970-1990
2	Helge Larsen	Venstre	1990-1994
3	Knud Gether	Local party	1994-2007

== Parishes ==
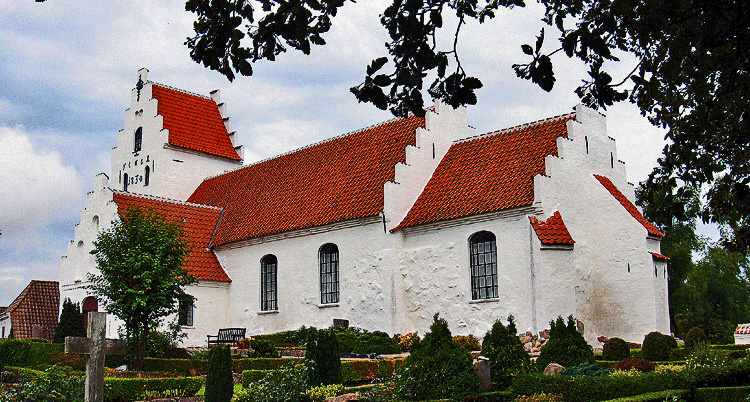
Fodslette Church

The municipality consisted of five parishes and seven churches.

- Fodslette Parish (Fodslette Church)
- Humble Parish (Humble Church, Kædeby Church, Ristinge Church)
- Lindelse Parish (Lindelse Church)
- Magleby Parish (Magleby Church)
- Tryggelev Parish (Tryggelev Church)

== Symbols ==
Sydlangeland Municipality's coat of arms was three white fish and three yellow leaves of hops on a blue background.
