= Rudkøbing =

- Town
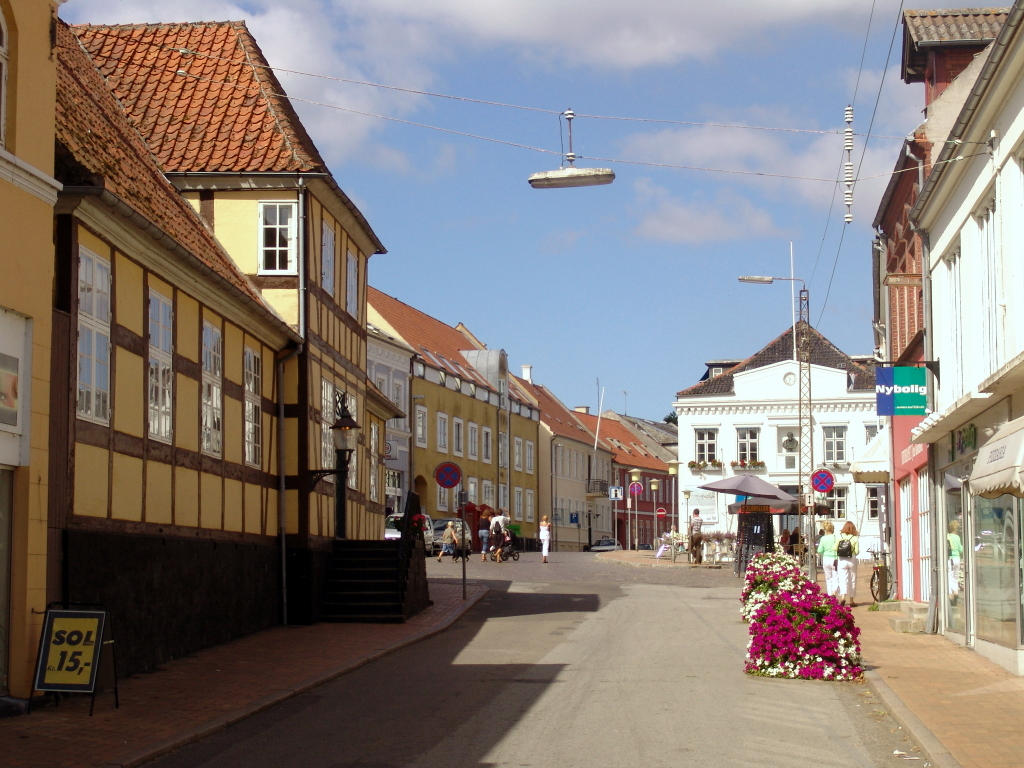
- Market place in Rudkøbing

- Coat of arms

- Location within Region of Southern Denmark
- Coordinates: 54.93685°N 10.70966°E
- Country: Denmark
- Region: Southern Denmark
- Municipality: Langeland

Area
  - Urban: 3.2 km^{2} (1.2 sq mi)

Population (2026)
  - Urban: 4,449
  - Urban density: 1,400/km^{2} (3,600/sq mi)
  - Gender: 2,135 males and 2,314 females
- Time zone: UTC+1 (CET)
  - Summer (DST): UTC+2 (CEST)
- Postal code: 5900

Rudkøbing is a town in Denmark, on the western coast of the island of Langeland. It is the seat of Langeland Municipality, in the Southern Denmark Region. The town is located 15 kilometres (9.3 mi) southeast of Svendborg and is connected to Siø through the Siøsund Bridge.

== History ==
The first mention of Rudkøbing was in 1287, when it was given market town privileges by Duke Valdemar IV of Schleswig, who held the title of rigsforstander (da) under King Eric VI Menved. The original Rudkøbing Church was most likely built in the late 12th century or early 13th century. During the Count's Feud (1534–1536) and again during the Dano-Swedish War (1658–1660), Rudkøbing was under siege by Swedish troops. Both times, the town's fortifications prevented Rudkøbing from immediately falling, but the town eventually had to give in to the Swedes. The town was hit by the Black Plague during the 16th and 17th centuries, and experienced fires in 1590 and 1610.

The Ørsted family, which most notably includes the brothers Hans Christian and Anders Sandøe Ørsted, has its origins in Rudkøbing. Their father was a pharmacist, and the brothers were born in the old pharmacy on Gåsetorvet. Across from their birth house is a statue of Hans Christian, and a statue of Anders is located at nearby Ørstedsparken, which is named in their honor. The old pharmacy remained in use until 2017.

Rudkøbing got its first proper harbor in 1826 (it had previously only had a pier). In 1898, in a town of about 3,500 people, there were 152 ships based in Rudkøbing. Every year, over 2,500 ships (carrying over 18,000 metric tons of cargo) came in and over 2,800 ships (carrying over 11,500 metric tons of cargo) went out, mostly to and from elsewhere in Denmark. The town was connected by steam ferry routes to Copenhagen, Korsør, Marstal, and Svendborg.

The town's population was stable during the interwar period, hovering above 4,000, with the census in 1930 recording a population of 4,129. The population peaked at 4,541 in 1950, and by 1965, it had fallen to 4,204. Around this time a suburb developed in Skrøbelev Parish, which eventually grew together with Rudkøbing.

Each year between 1991 and 2022, the town hosted Langelandsfestivalen, a music festival which targeted families. Usually lasting 8 days, the festival had performances from both Danish and foreign musicians. The 2023 edition was canceled because of economic problems, and the company behind the festival filed for bankruptcy at the Maritime and Commercial Court on 13 June 2023, after owner Allan K. Pedersen had unsuccessfully tried to find a new owner.

Rudkøbing was the seat of the former Rudkøbing Municipality in Funen County, and is the seat of the current Langeland Municipality in the Southern Denmark Region. When Rudkøbing was its own municipality, there were often negotiations with the two other Langelandic municipalities of Sydlangeland and Tranekær to merge. These plans were repeatedly abandoned due to a lack of public support. In the 2007 Danish Municipal Reform, the three were forced together, and Rudkøbing has since been the municipal seat.

== Transport ==
Bridges connecting Rudkøbing and Svendborg were built throughout the late 1950s and early 1960s, finishing in 1966. The old ferry route between the two towns gradually lost popularity due to the bridges, and the route was eventually ended. The ferry route to Marstal, which had been active since 1866, was closed in 2013, so that the only ferry on this route could be moved to the busy route between Marstal and Svendborg. The ferry route between Rudkøbing and Marstal opened again in December 2019.

The Langeland Bridge was built between 1960 and 1962. It connects Rudkøbing and the rest of Langeland to the island of Siø. Siø is further linked by the Siøsund Bridge to Tåsinge, and Tåsinge is linked by the Svendborgsund Bridge to Svendborg on the mainland of Funen, making Rudkøbing accessible by road.

From 1911 to 1962, Rudkøbing was the main station of the Langeland rail network (Langelandsbanen). The network was connected to Svendborg in 1926, when a railway ferry route made it possible to move train wagons between Rudkøbing and the mainland of Funen.

== Notable residents ==
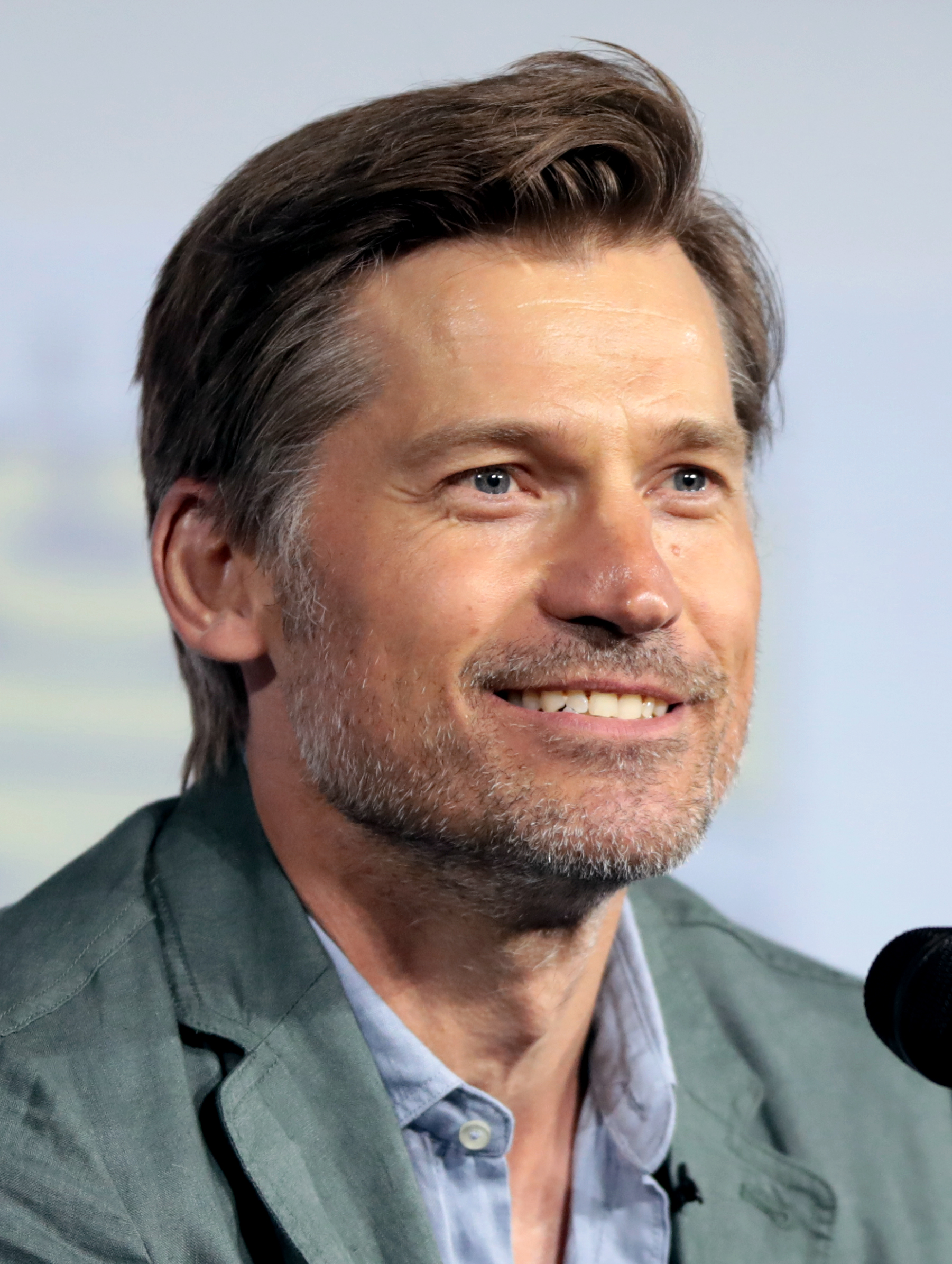
Nikolaj Coster-Waldau

=== Artists ===
- Jens Christian Bay (1871–1962), Danish American writer, bibliographer and librarian, who emigrated to the US in 1892.
- Preben Lerdorff Rye (1917–1995), actor who appeared in 92 films
- Bjørn Watt-Boolsen (1923–1998), actor who played several characters in the Olsen-banden films.
- Nikolaj Coster-Waldau (born 1970), actor who played Jaime Lannister in the TV series Game of Thrones.

=== Athletes ===
- Ingrid Larsen (1912–1997), diver who competed in the 1932 Summer Olympics.
- Hans Jørgen Boye (born 1942), retired rower who competed in the 1964 Summer Olympics.

=== Politicians and public thinkers ===
- Erik Bredal (1608–1672), Danish-born Norwegian Lutheran bishop.
- Otto Fabricius (1744–1822), missionary, naturalist, ethnographer, and explorer of Greenland.
- Anders Sandøe Ørsted (1778–1860), politician and jurist, who served as Prime Minister of Denmark 1853–1854.
- Mads Johansen Lange (1807–1856), nicknamed the King of Bali, Danish trader, entrepreneur, and peace maker on Bali. Several of his descendants visited Rudkøbing in 2011, including Tunku Abu Bakar bin Tunku Abdul Rahman, first cousin of sultan Ibrahim Iskandar of Johor.

=== Scientists ===
- Hans Christian Ørsted (1777–1851), physicist and chemist who discovered that electric currents create magnetic fields, known for Oersted's law
- Anders Sandøe Ørsted (1816–1872), botanist, mycologist, zoologist and marine biologist.
- Marianne Schroll (born 1942), specialist in geriatric medicine

== Gallery ==
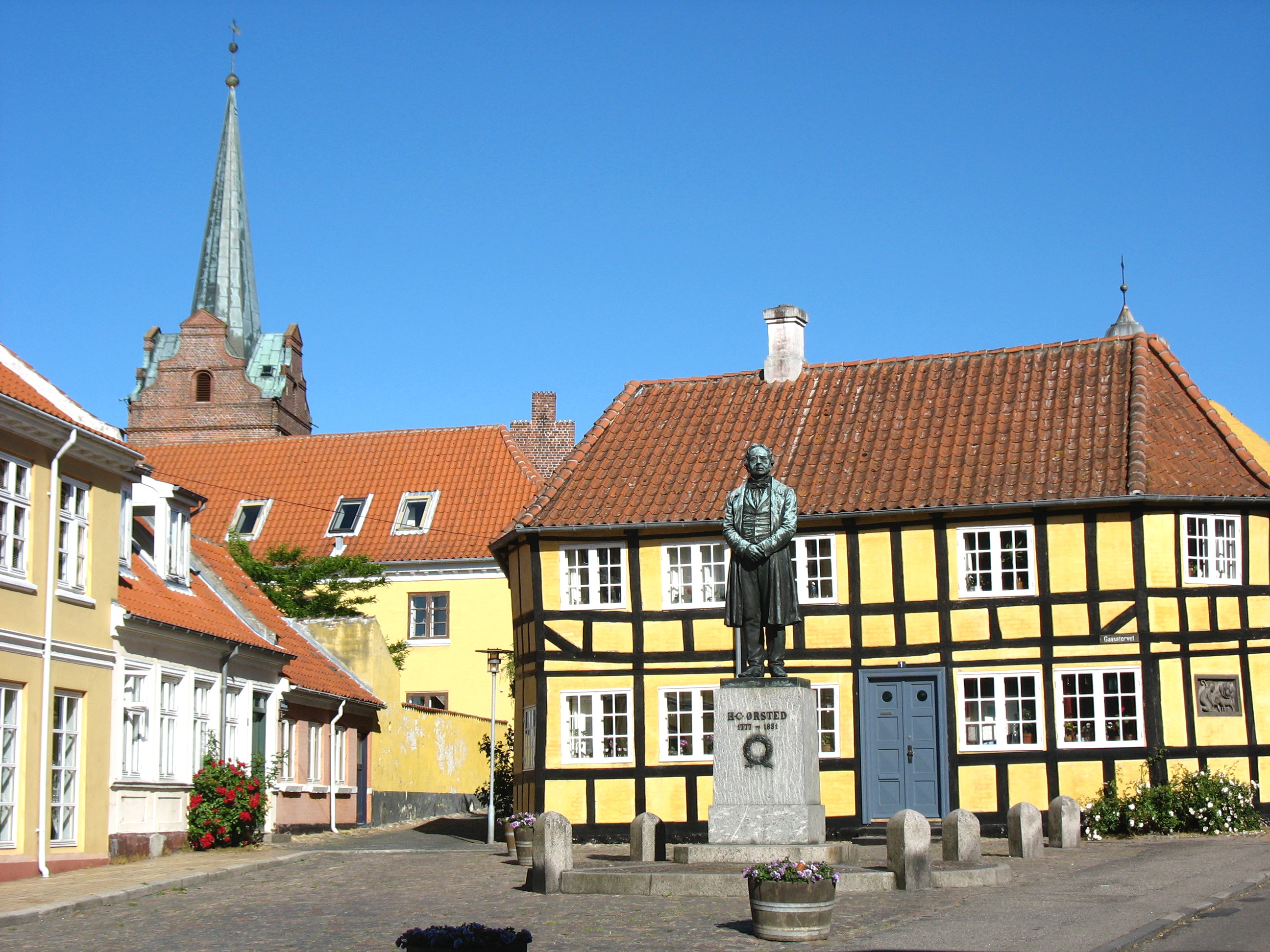
Statue of Hans Christian Ørsted on Gåsetorvet.

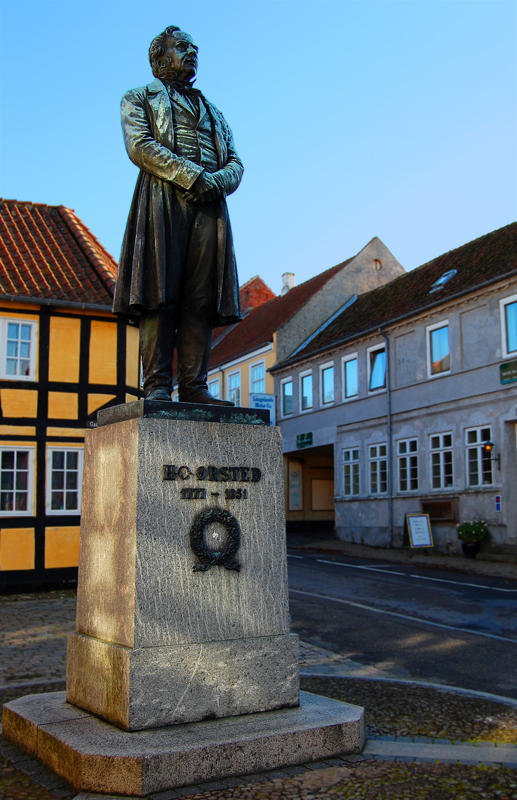
Closeup of the Ørsted statue on Gåsetorvet.

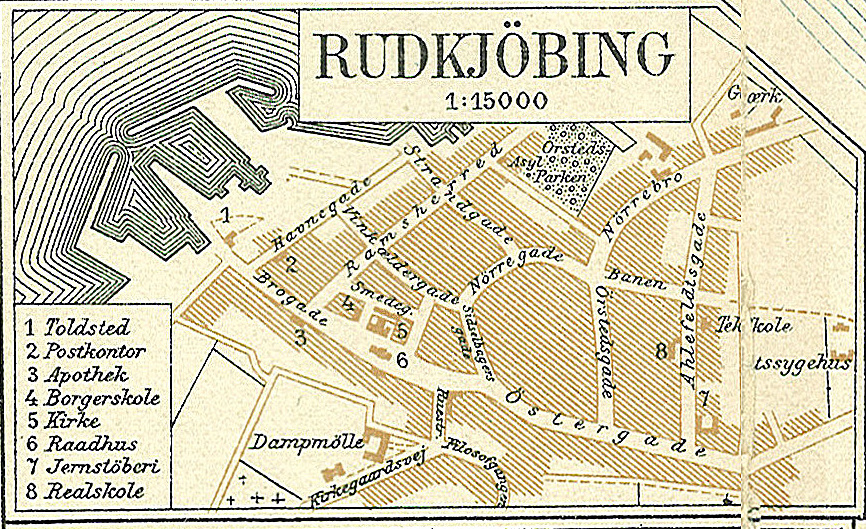
Map of Rudkøbing in 1900. Note the archaic spelling of the town's name.

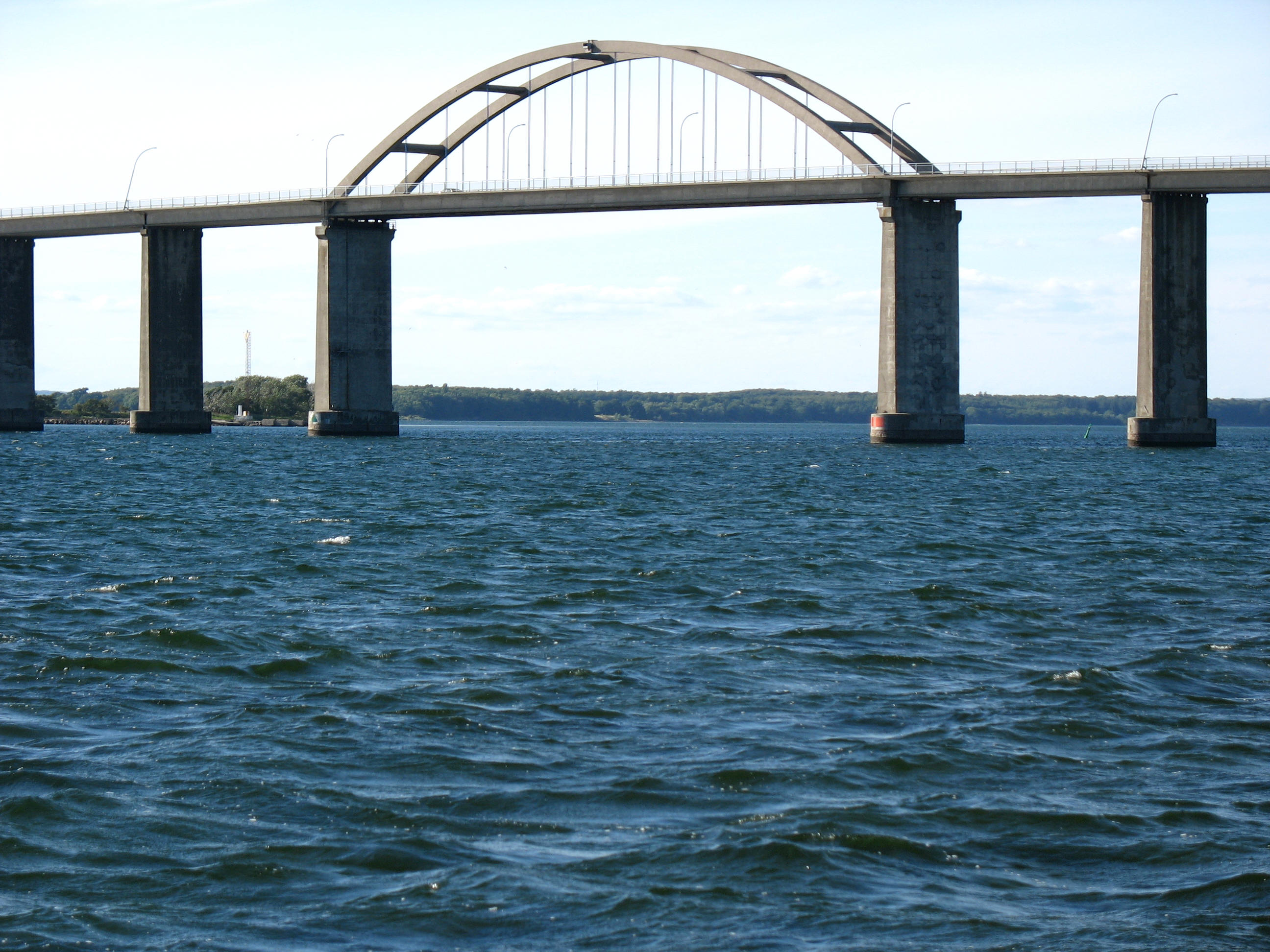
The Langeland Bridge, as seen from Rudkøbing.

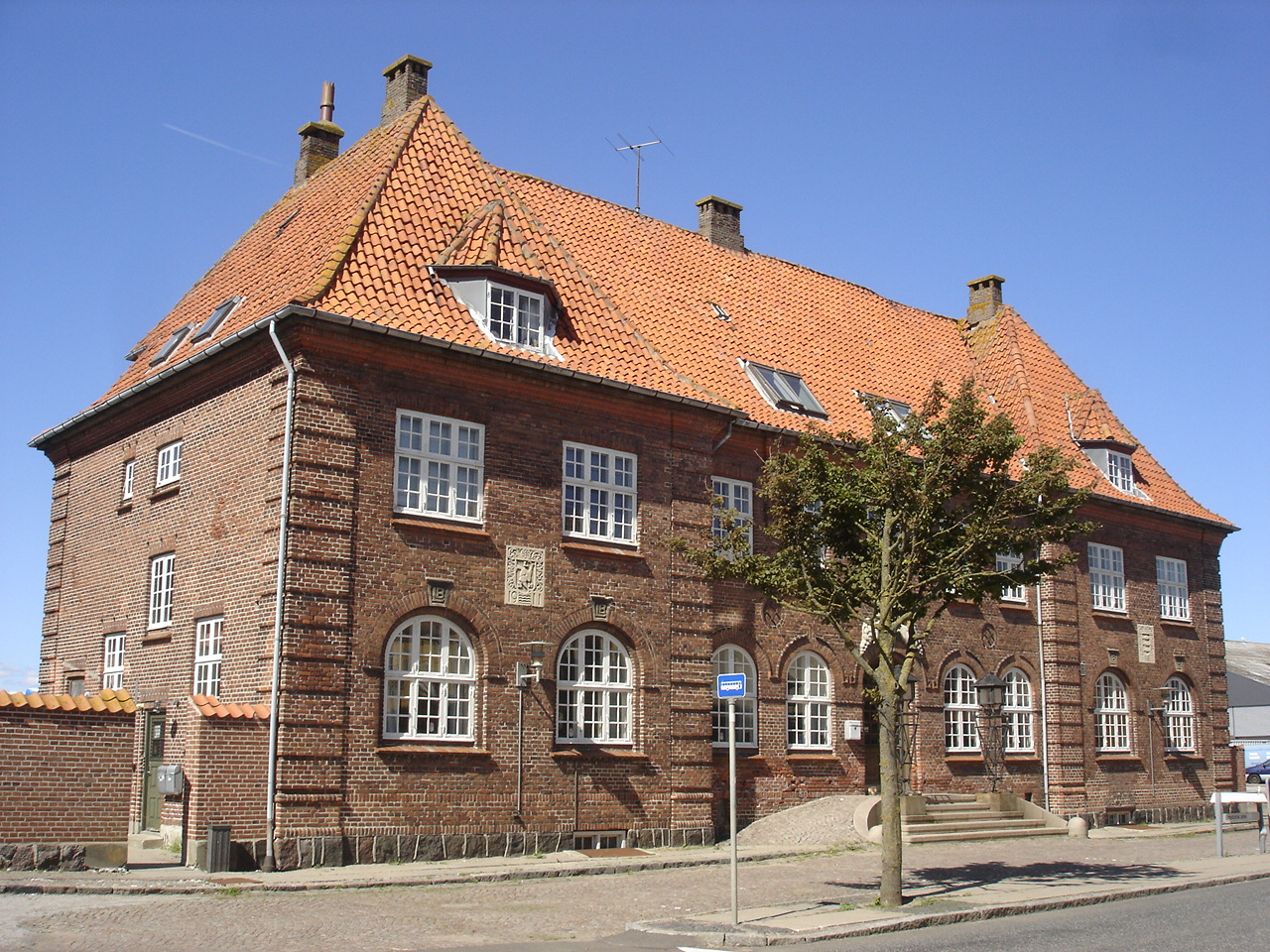
The old railway station in Rudkøbing.

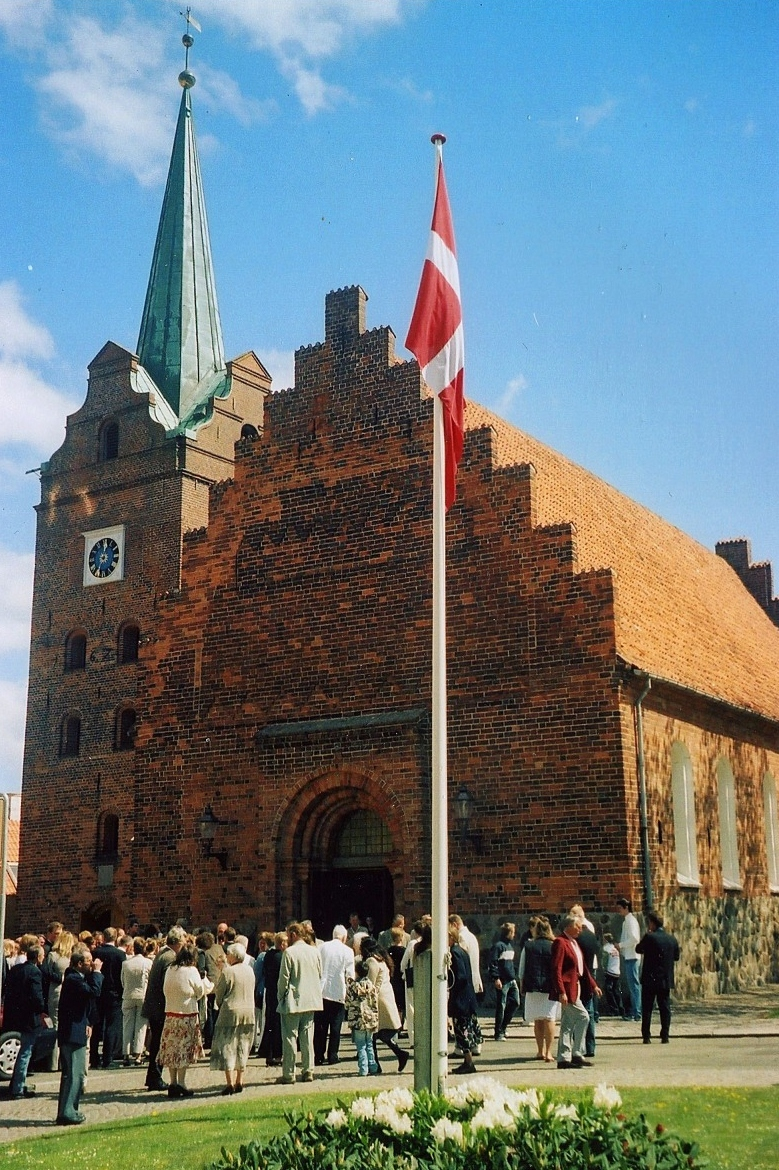
Rudkøbing Church.
