= Rudkøbing Church =

Coordinates: 54.9368769°N 10.7095857°E

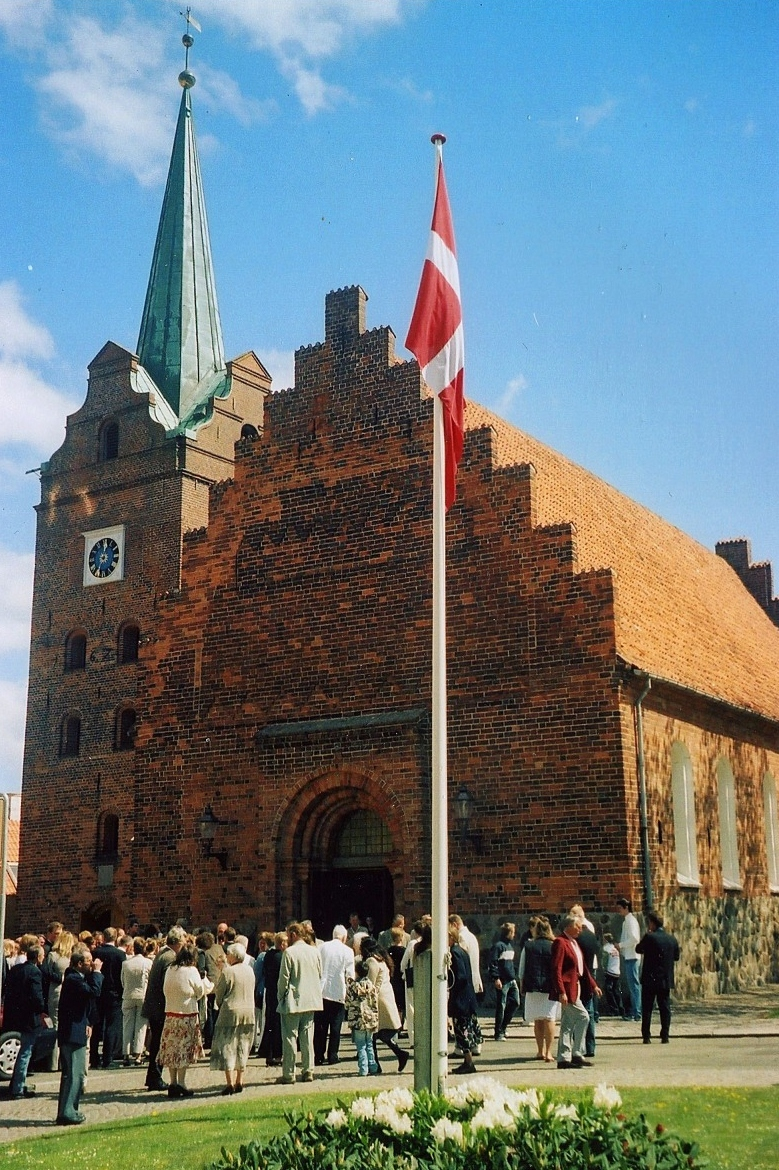
- Rudkøbing Church in 2007

Rudkøbing Church is a church located in Rudkøbing, Langeland, Denmark. It is unsure when exactly the church was built, but it is estimated that it was most likely in the late 12th century or early 13th century. The church was restored by Hans Jacob Dahr in 1780, by Niels Sigfred Nebelong in 1837, by Hector Estrup in 1895 and by Marinus Andersen in 1956. The altar decoration used is copied from Aabykrucifikset.
