= List of churches in Langeland Municipality =

This list of churches in Langeland Municipality lists church buildings in Langeland Municipality, Denmark.

== National Churches ==
=== Bagenkop Church ===
Bagenkop Church
- Bagenkop Kirke
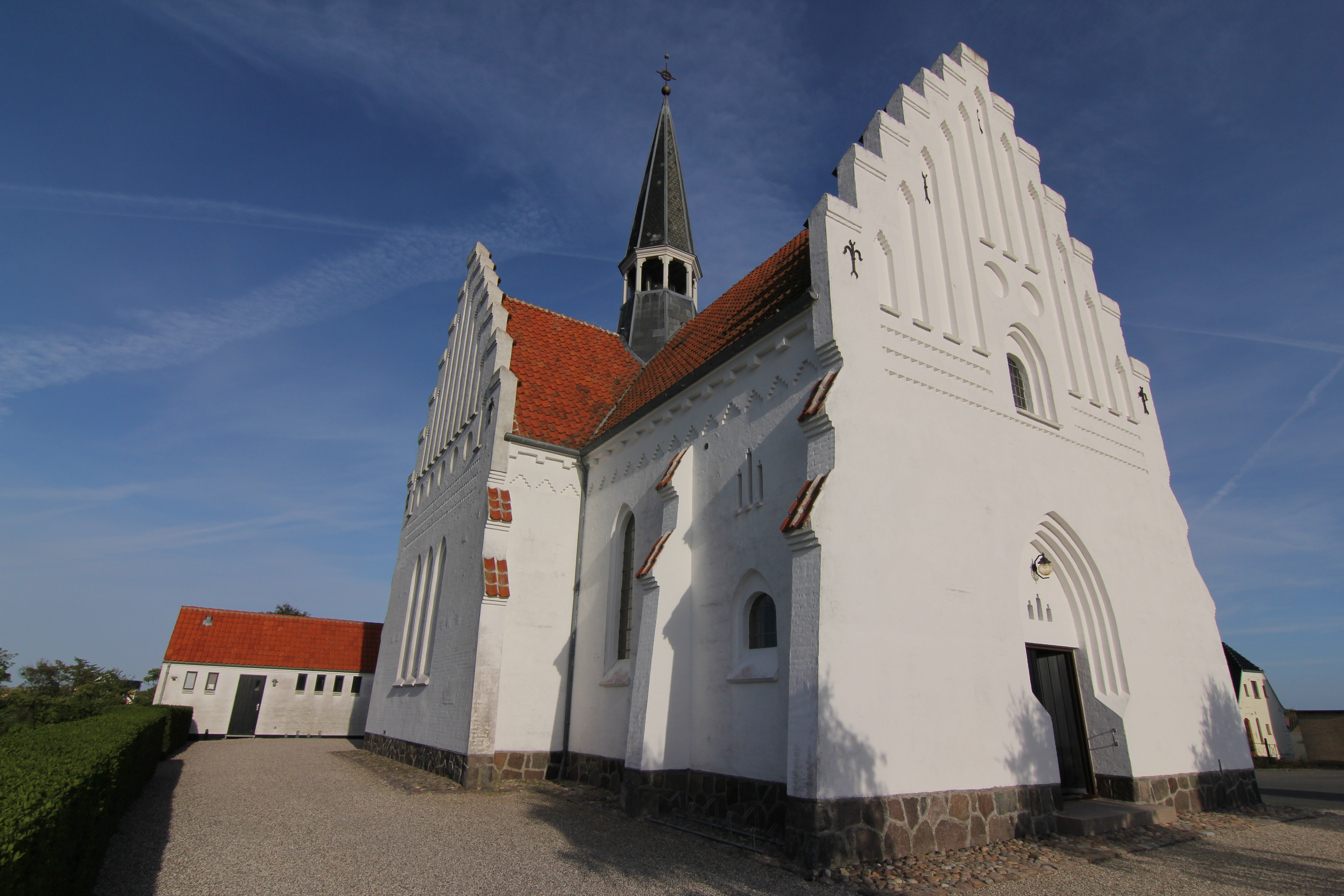
- Bagenkop Church
- 54°45′2.69″N 10°40′45.34″E
- Location: Bagenkop, Denmark
- Denomination: Church of Denmark

Architecture
- Completed: 19 December 1920

Administration
- Diocese: Diocese of Funen
- Deanery: Langeland-Ærø Provsti
- Parish: Bagenkop Parish

Bagenkop Church is located in Bagenkop. It is the only national church in Bagenkop Parish. The church has a churchyard with a cemetery.

Bagenkop Church is the youngest church on Langeland. It was opened on 19 December 1920.

The organ is from 1955 and from Paris. It was bought by the parish council in 1997 and established in the church in 1998. The church's altar piece is painted by Brûcher Henriksen, who also worked on the church's glass mosaic. He began work on the mosaic in 1957, but it wasn't finished until 1997, where Helle Scharling had taken over the work on the mosaic.

=== Bøstrup Church ===
Bøstrup Church
- Bøstrup Kirke
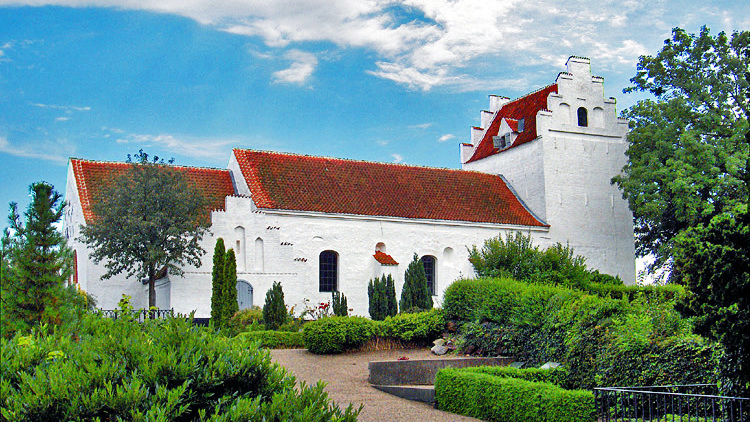
- Bøstrup Church
- 55°2′43.01″N 10°52′53.26″E
- Location: Bøstrup, Denmark
- Denomination: Church of Denmark

History
- Founded: Ca. 1200

Administration
- Diocese: Diocese of Funen
- Deanery: Langeland-Ærø Provsti
- Parish: Bøstrup Parish

Bøstrup Church is located in Bøstrup. It is the only national church in Bøstrup Parish. The church has a churchyard with a cemetery.

The church is from around 1200. The oldest part of the church is the nave, with expansions made in the 14th and 15th centuries.

The church's baptismal font is in granite and from around 1200. The two votive ships in the church are from 1852 and 1961.

=== Fodslette Church ===
Fodslette Church
- Fodslette Kirke
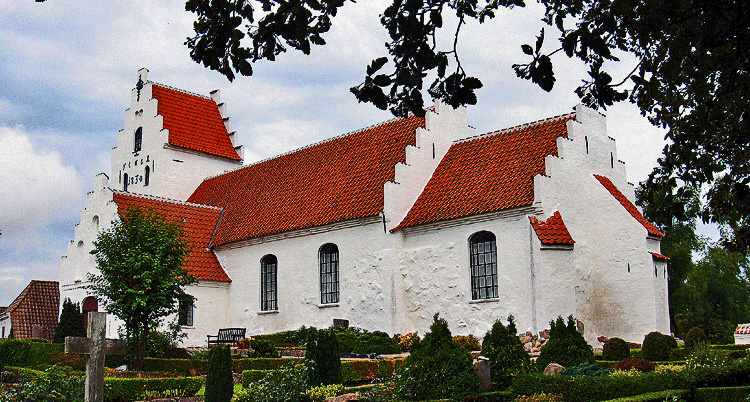
- Fodslette Church
- 54°48′57.42″N 10°44′6.18″E
- Location: Fodslette, Denmark
- Denomination: Church of Denmark

History
- Founded: Ca. 1250

Administration
- Diocese: Diocese of Funen
- Deanery: Langeland-Ærø Provsti
- Parish: Fodslette Parish

Fodslette Church is located in Fodslette. It is the only national church in Fodslette Parish. The church has a churchyard with a cemetery.

The oldest parts of the church are the choir and nave, built around 1250. The church porch is from around 1450 and the upper parts of the tower are from 1649.

=== Fuglsbølle Church ===
Fuglsbølle Church
- Fuglsbølle Kirke
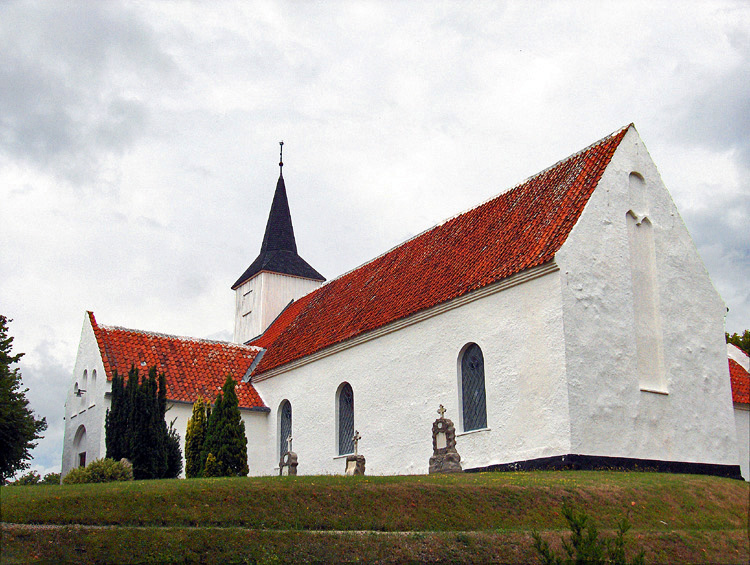
- Fuglsbølle Church
- 54°54′5.37″N 10°45′41.01″E
- Location: Fuglsbølle, Denmark
- Denomination: Church of Denmark

Specifications
- Capacity: 130

Administration
- Diocese: Diocese of Funen
- Deanery: Langeland-Ærø Provsti
- Parish: Fuglsbølle Parish

Fuglsbølle Church is located in Fuglsbølle. It is the only national church in Fuglsbølle Parish. The church has a churchyard with a cemetery.

The church was built in the Middle Age.

The church's votive ship is from 1929 to 1930, built after a model of HDMS Jylland. The church's organ is from 1991 and built by Bruno Christensen.

=== Hou Church ===
Hou Church
- Hou Kirke
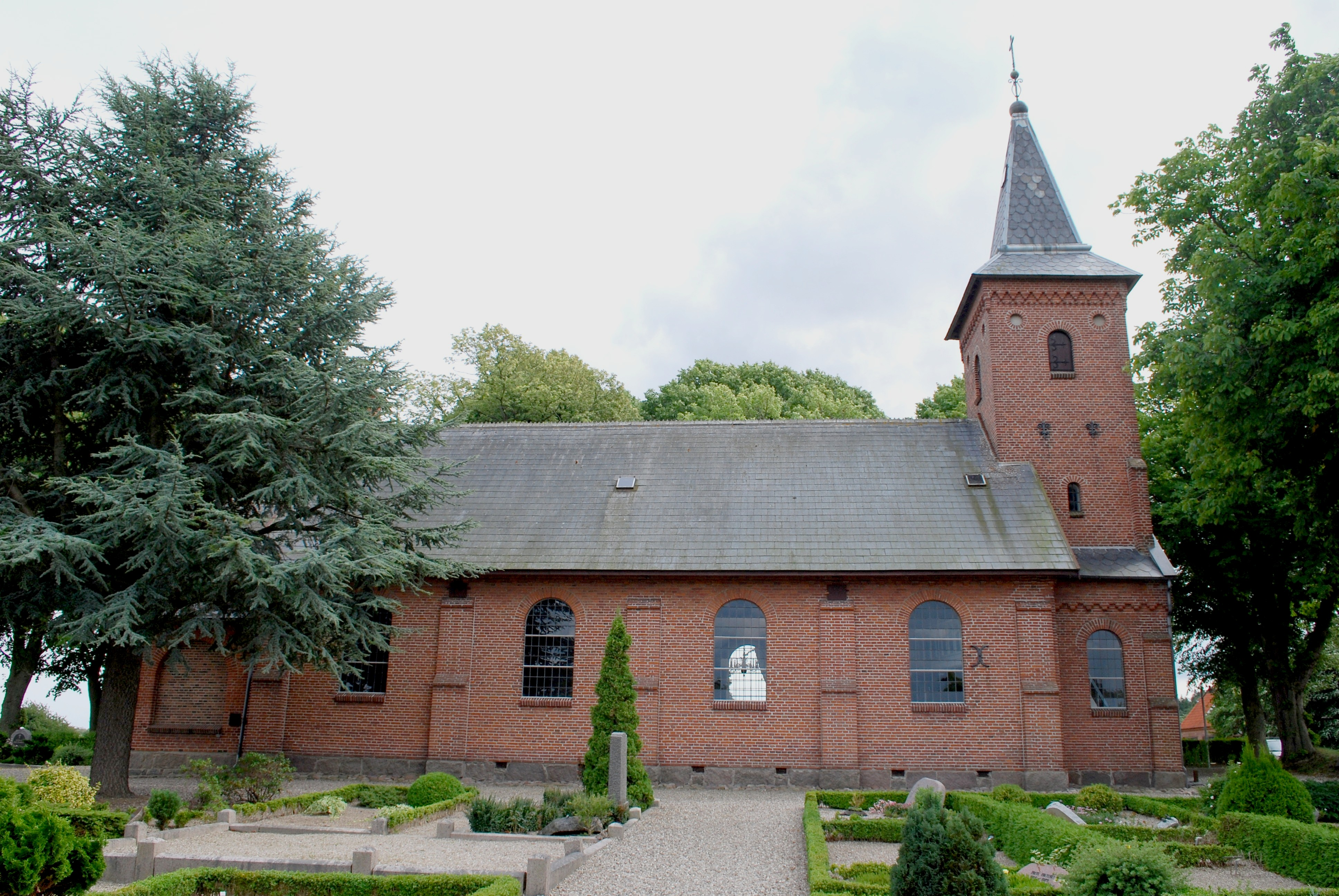
- Hou Church
- 55°7′47.32″N 10°55′22.92″E
- Location: Lohals, Denmark
- Denomination: Church of Denmark

Administration
- Diocese: Diocese of Funen
- Deanery: Langeland-Ærø Provsti
- Parish: Hou Parish

Hou Church is located in Lohals. It is the only national church in Hou Parish. The church has a churchyard with a cemetery.

The church started out as a chapel and was built in the 1800s. In 1904 a tower was added.

The baptismal font is from the 1200s. The organ is from 1952.

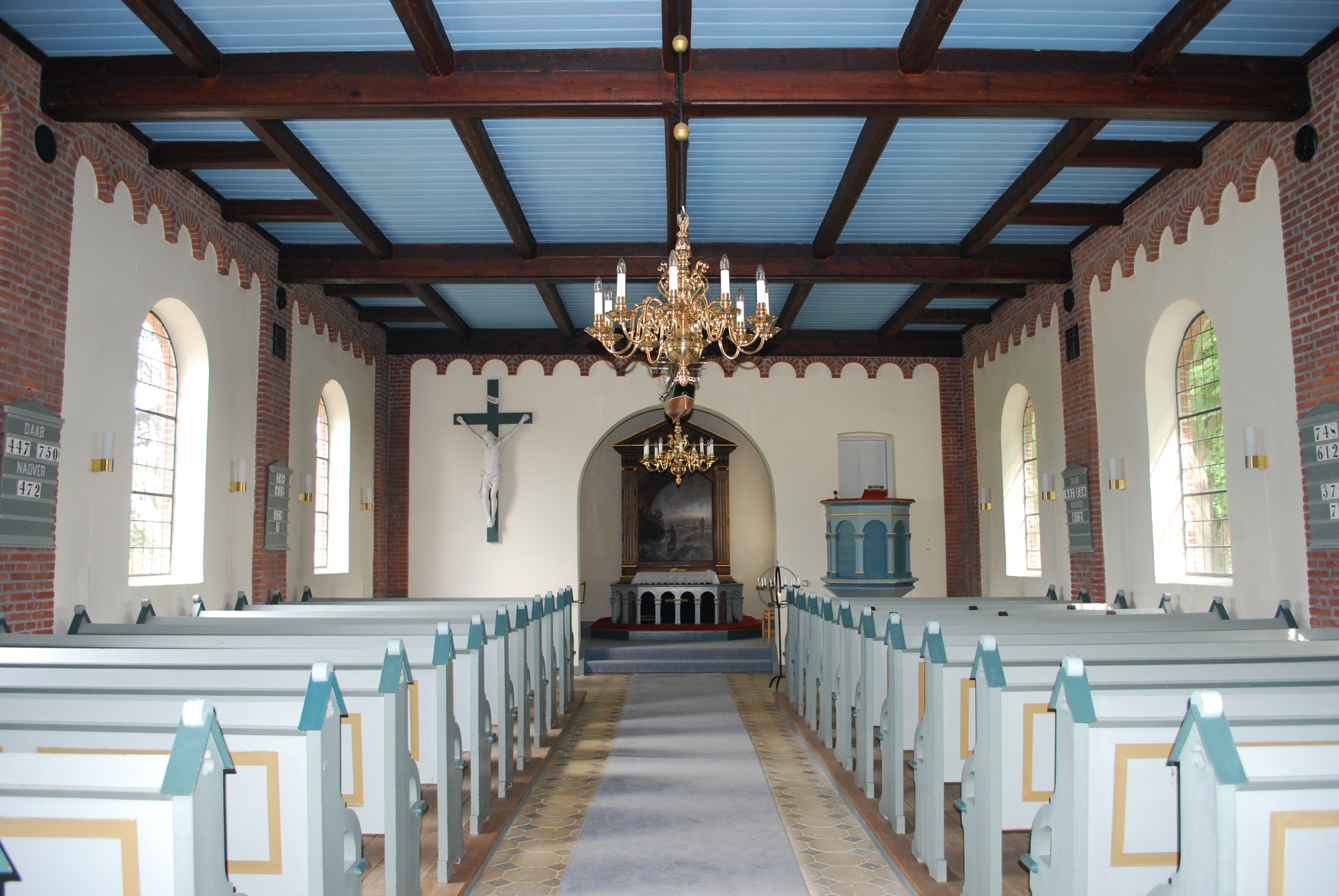
Church interior

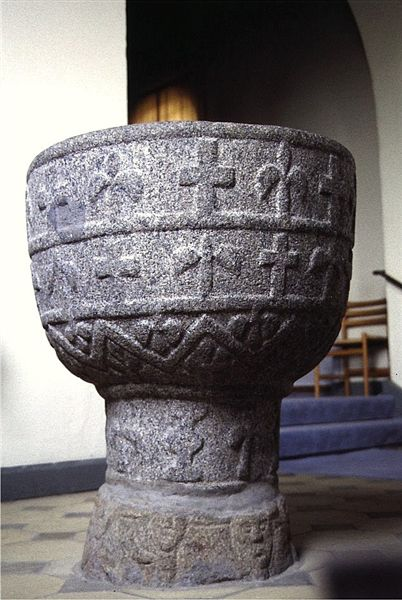
Baptismal font

=== Humble Church ===
Humble Church
- Humble Kirke
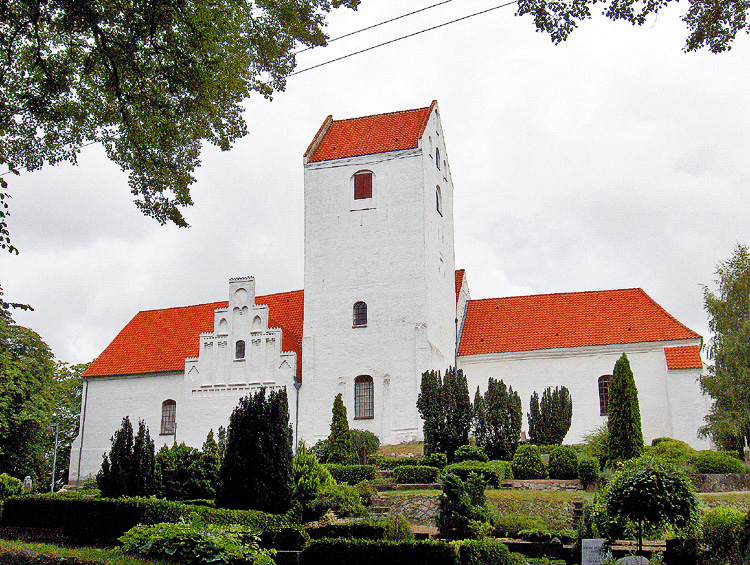
- Humble Church
- 54°50′3.3″N 10°42′21.39″E
- Location: Humble, Denmark
- Denomination: Church of Denmark

Specifications
- Capacity: 400

Administration
- Diocese: Diocese of Funen
- Deanery: Langeland-Ærø Provsti
- Parish: Humble Parish

Humble Church is located in Humble. It is one of three national churches in Humble Parish. The church has a churchyard with a cemetery.

The church was built in the Middle Age.

The church bells are from 1430 and 1630. The bell from 1430 is the oldest on Langeland. The altarpiece is from 1863 and painted by F. Storck.

=== Kædeby Church ===
Kædeby Church
- Kædeby Kirke
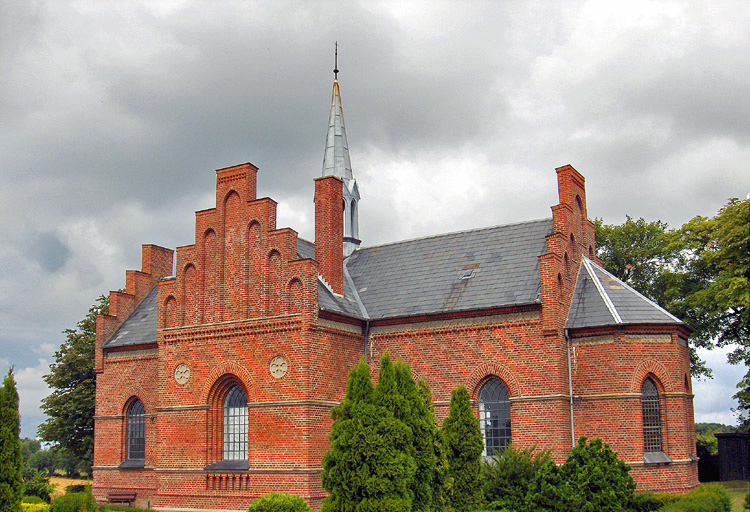
- Kædeby Church
- 54°51′40.33″N 10°40′39.21″E
- Denomination: Church of Denmark

Architecture
- Completed: 1885

Specifications
- Capacity: 100

Administration
- Diocese: Diocese of Funen
- Deanery: Langeland-Ærø Provsti
- Parish: Humble Parish

Kædeby Church is located 1 km north of Kædebybro and 3 km north-west of Kædeby. It is one of three national churches in Humble Parish. The church has a churchyard with a cemetery.

The church was built in 1885 by architect Emil Schwanenfliiget.

=== Lindelse Church ===
Lindelse Church
- Lindelse Kirke
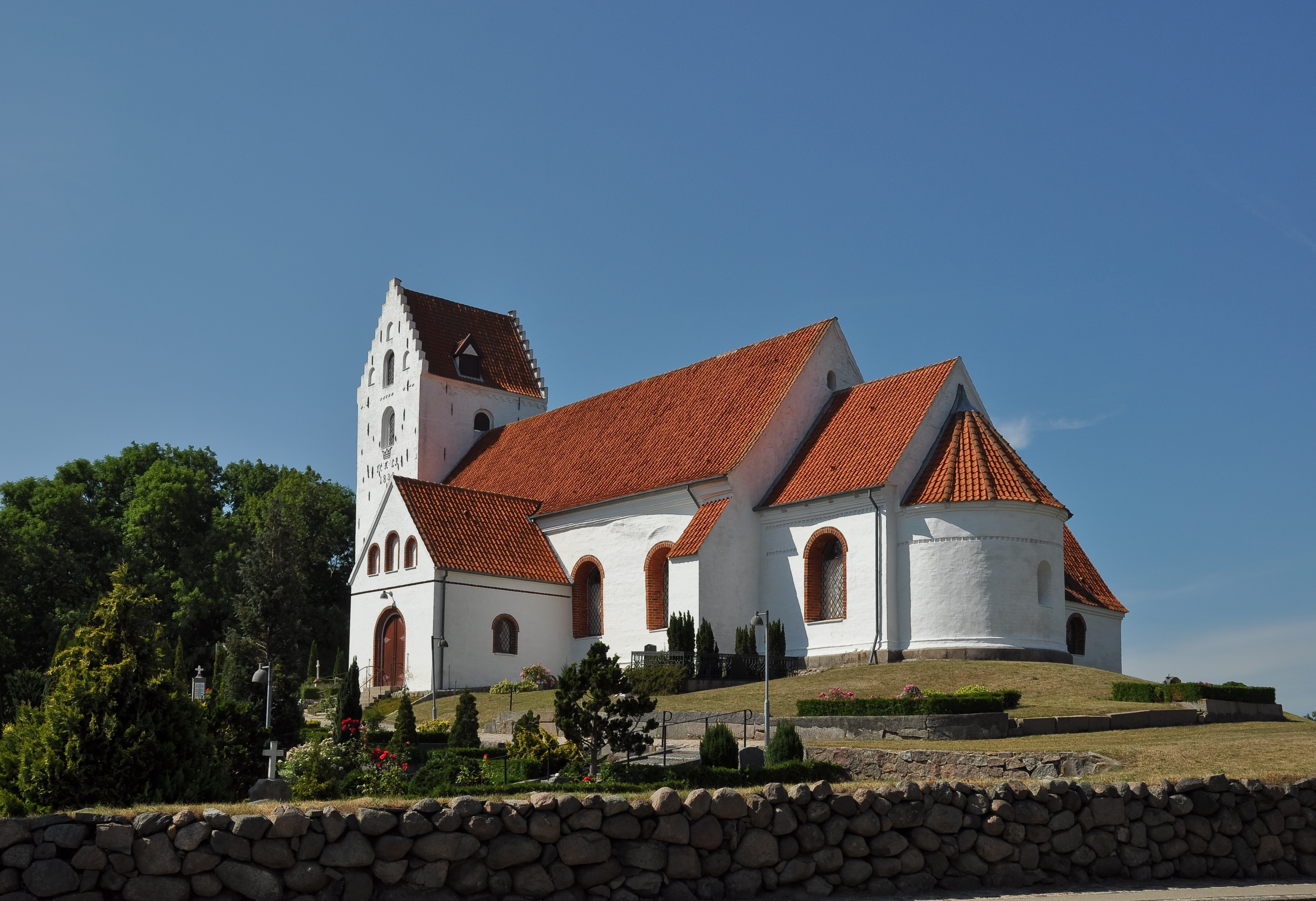
- Lindelse Church
- 54°51′53.53″N 10°43′46.07″E
- Location: Lindelse, Denmark
- Denomination: Church of Denmark

History
- Founded: Ca. 1200

Administration
- Diocese: Diocese of Funen
- Deanery: Langeland-Ærø Provsti
- Parish: Lindelse Parish

Lindelse Church is located in Lindelse. It is the only national church in Lindelse Parish. The church has a churchyard with a cemetery.

The church was built around 1200, with expansions added later. It underwent an extensive restoration in 1993.

The altarpiece is from around 1500. The pulpit is from 1628.

=== Longelse Church ===
Longelse Church
- Longelse Kirke
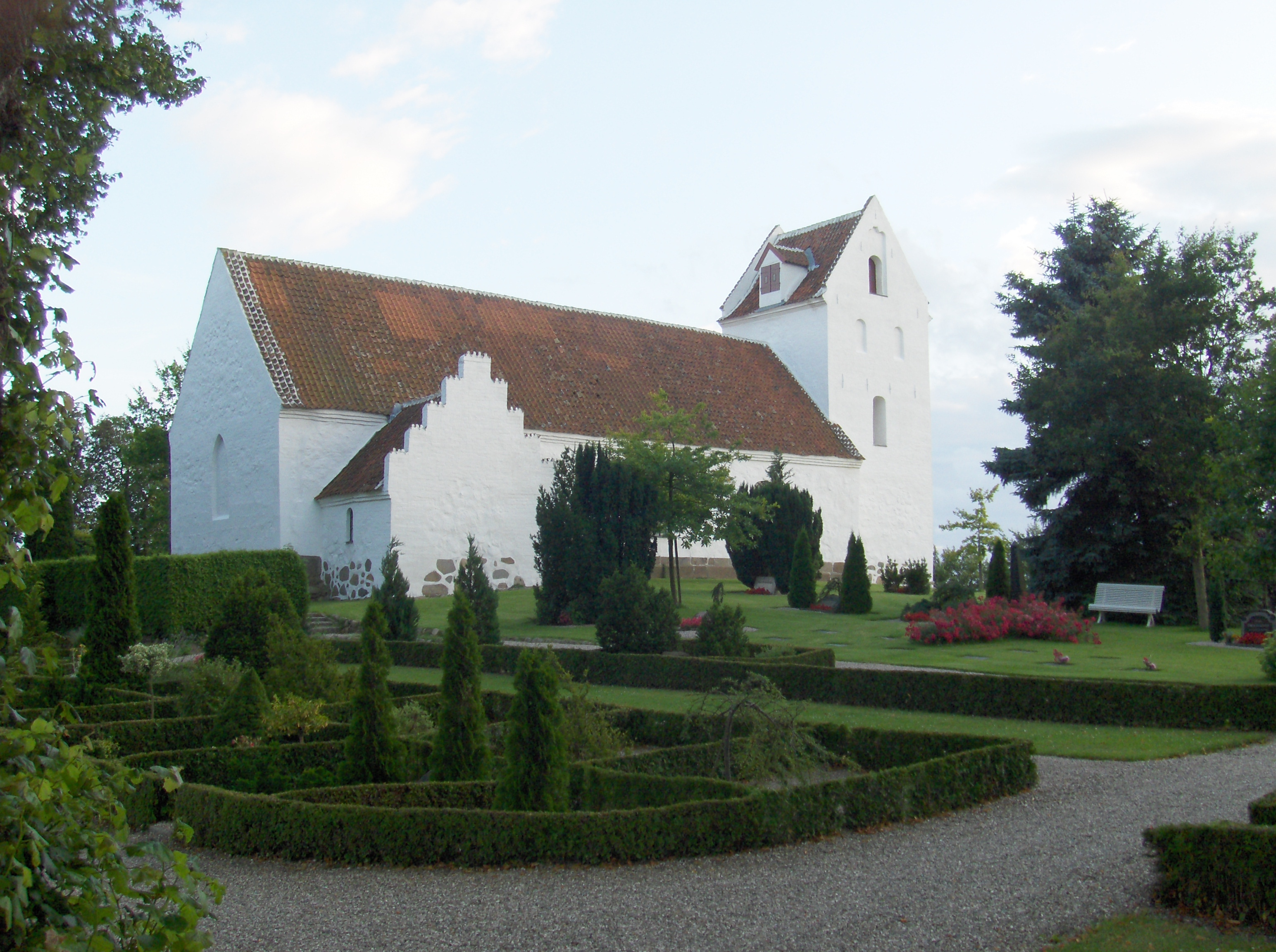
- Longelse Church
- 54°55′25.03″N 10°48′2.74″E
- Location: Nørre Longelse, Denmark
- Denomination: Church of Denmark

Specifications
- Capacity: 200

Administration
- Diocese: Diocese of Funen
- Deanery: Langeland-Ærø Provsti
- Parish: Longelse Parish

Longelse Church is located in Nørre Longelse. It is the only national church in Longelse Parish. The church has a churchyard with a cemetery.

The church's organ is from 1989, built by Bruno Christensen.

=== Magleby Church ===
Magleby Church
- Magleby Kirke
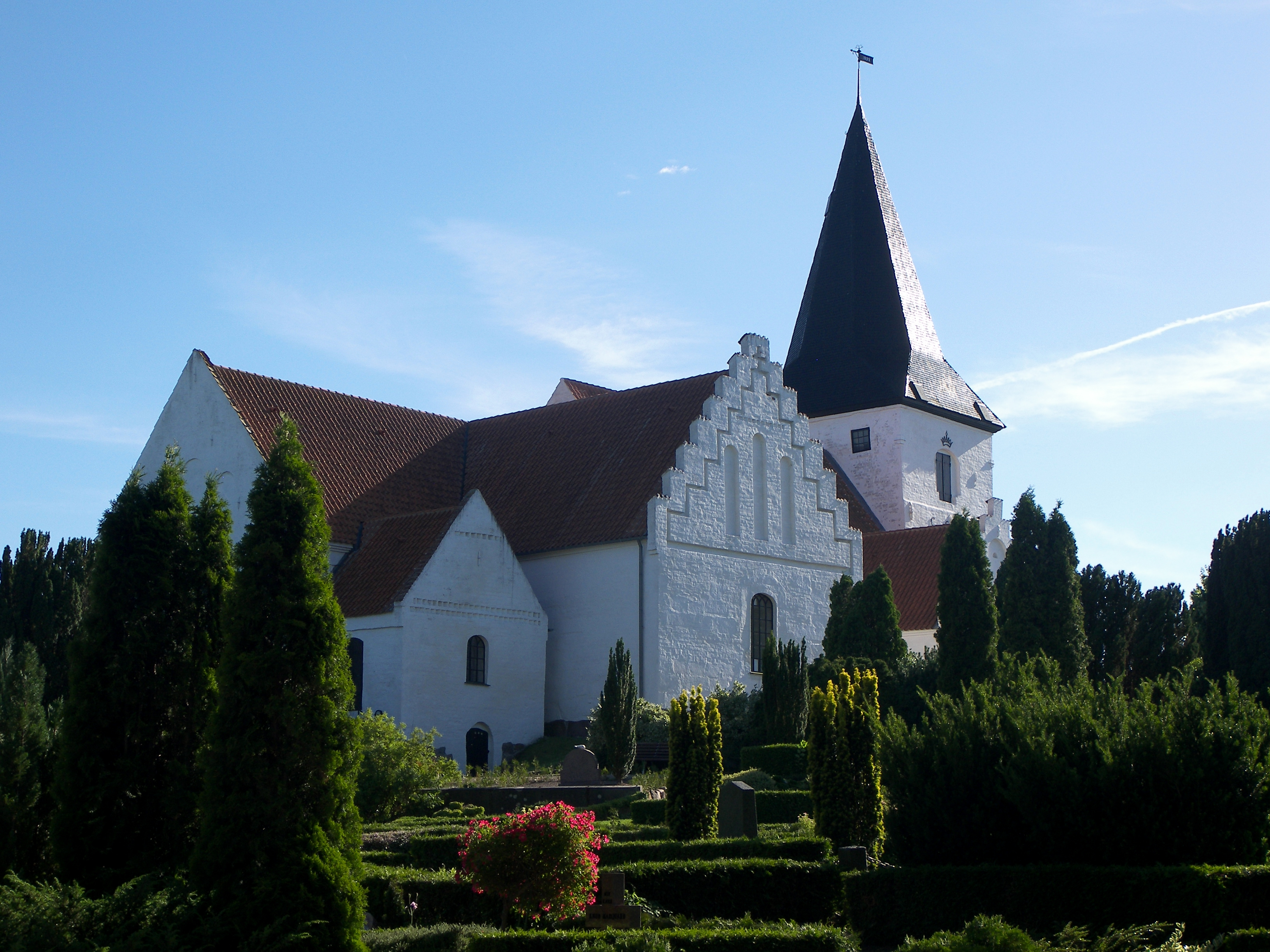
- Magleby Church
- 54°46′17.43″N 10°42′47.93″E
- Location: Magleby, Denmark
- Denomination: Church of Denmark

Administration
- Diocese: Diocese of Funen
- Deanery: Langeland-Ærø Provsti
- Parish: Magleby Parish

Magleby Church is located in Magleby. It is the only national church in Magleby Parish. The church has a churchyard with a cemetery.

The church was built in the Middle Ages.

=== Ristinge Church ===
Ristinge Church
- Ristinge Kirke
- 54°49′25.52″N 10°38′9.1″E
- Location: Ristinge, Denmark
- Denomination: Church of Denmark

Architecture
- Completed: 1880

Administration
- Diocese: Diocese of Funen
- Deanery: Langeland-Ærø Provsti
- Parish: Humble Parish

Ristinge Church is located in Ristinge. It is one of three national churches in Humble Parish.. The church has a churchyard with a cemetery.

The church was built in 1880.

=== Rudkøbing Church ===
Rudkøbing Church
- Rudkøbing Kirke
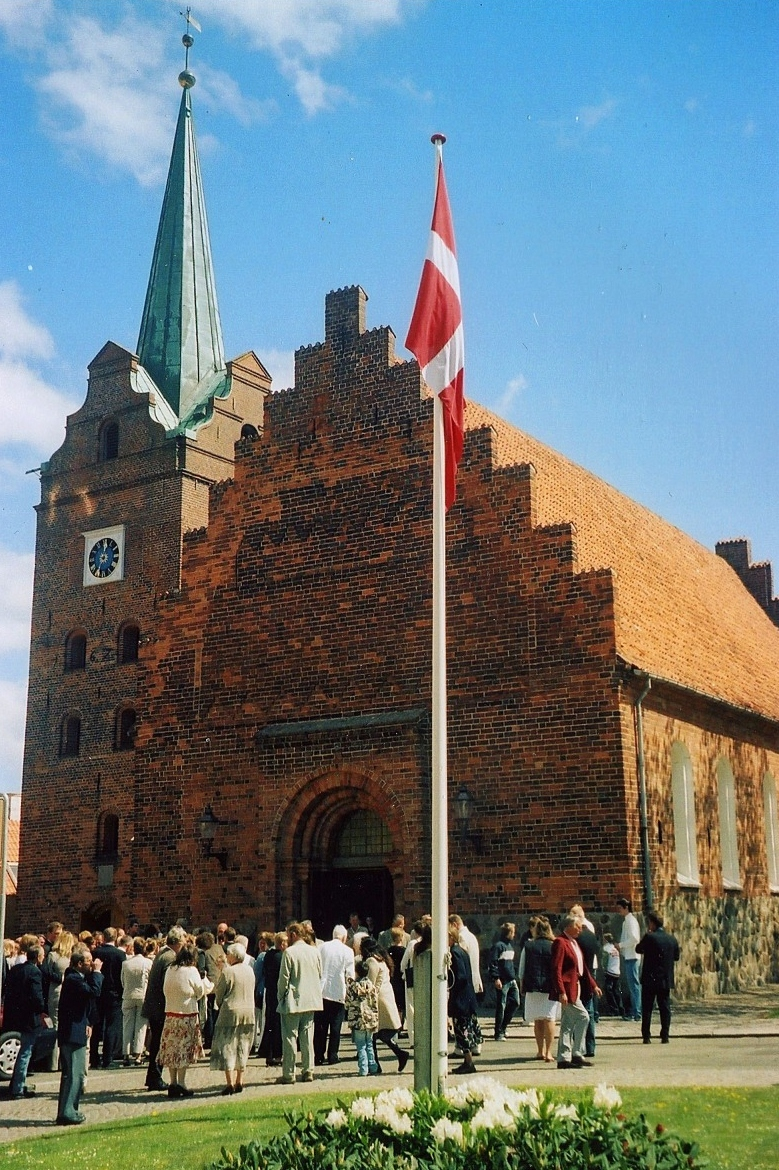
- Rudkøbing Church
- 54°56′12.59″N 10°42′34.49″E
- Location: Rudkøbing, Denmark
- Denomination: Church of Denmark

History
- Founded: 1200s

Administration
- Diocese: Diocese of Funen
- Deanery: Langeland-Ærø Provsti
- Parish: Rudkøbing Parish

Rudkøbing Church is located in Rudkøbing. It is the only national church in Rudkøbing Parish. The church has a churchyard with a cemetery.

The church was built in the middle of the 1200s, built over the remains of an older church from the later parts of the 1100s. A new wing was added to the northern part of the church around 1500, and in 1621 a tower was added. The church used to have a church porch to the south, but it was torn down in 1837. The church also had a small chapel from 1707 to 1815. The church was restored by Hans Jacob Dahr in 1780–1781, by Niels Sigfred Nebelong in 1837, by Hector Estrup in 1895-1897 and by Marinus Andersen in 1956.

The altar table is from 1904. The table includes decorations drawn by Hector Estrup and sculpted by Niels Hansen from Copenhagen. The church's baptismal fonts are from 1837 and 1968. There are two votive ships in the church. One was hung in the church in 1795, but is possibly older than that. It is named Kronprins Frederik, and was restored in 1844, 1903, 1943-1944 and 1967. The other votive ship was hung in the church in 1811 and named Frederik. It was restored in 1903 and 1943–1944. The clock is electric, and installed in the church in 1975. Before the electrical clock, the church had three other clocks. The first was a turret clock first mentioned in 1662. It was replaced in 1783 with a clock made by Claus Fabricius in Ærøsbøbing. That was then replaced in 1945, and moved to Langeland Museum. A new turret clock by Frithjof Bertram-Larsen from Copenhagen was installed. It was 1975 replaced by the electrical movement. The dials are from 1896. The church has three bells. One bell is from the Middle Age, while the other two are from 1778 and 1863.

=== Simmerbølle Church ===
Simmerbølle Church
- Simmerbølle Kirke
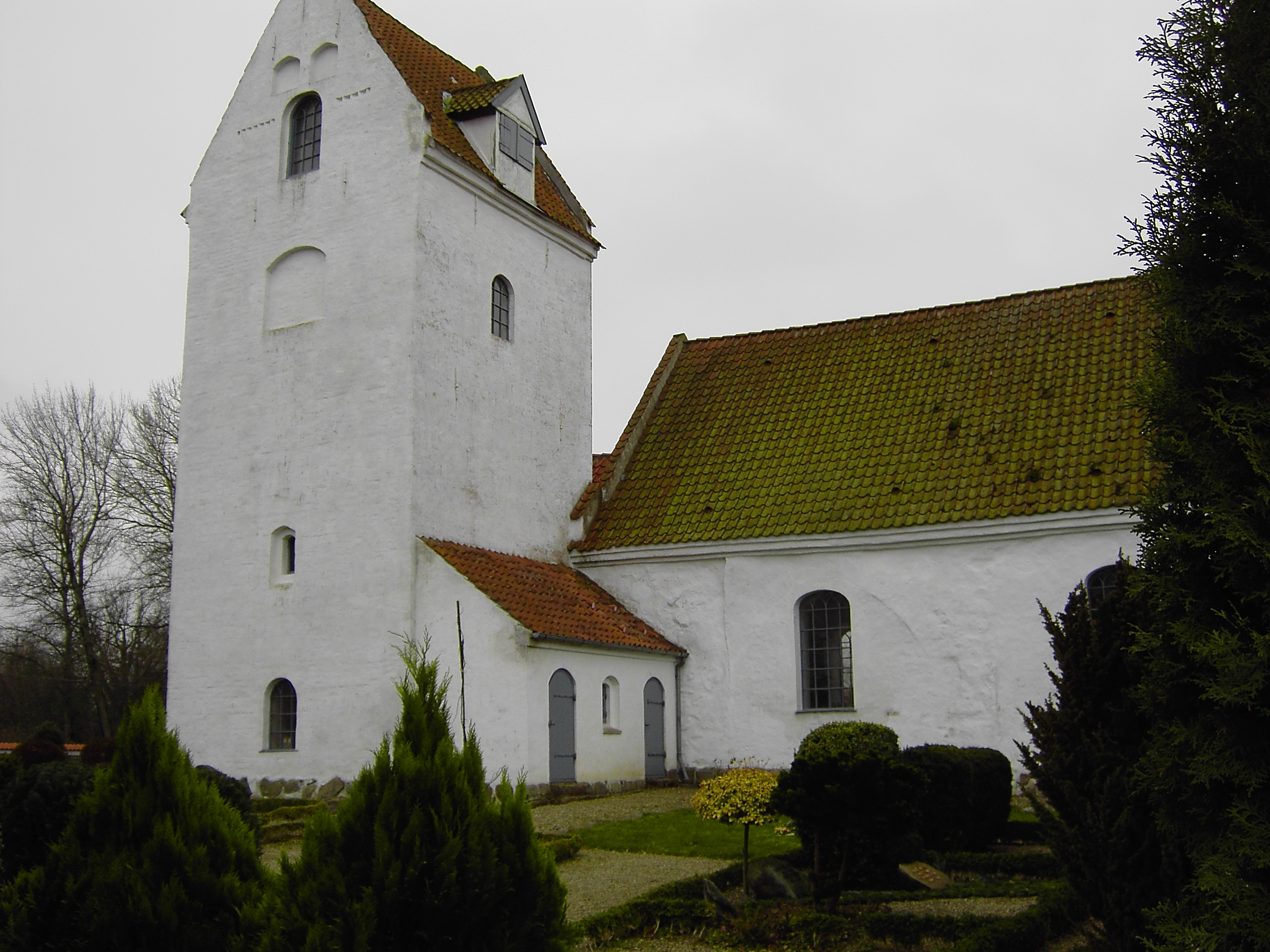
- Simmerbølle Church
- 54°56′41.6″N 10°45′44.6″E
- Location: Simmerbølle, Denmark
- Denomination: Church of Denmark

Administration
- Diocese: Diocese of Funen
- Deanery: Langeland-Ærø Provsti
- Parish: Simmerbølle Parish

Simmerbølle Church is located in Simmerbølle. It is the only national church in Simmerbølle Parish. The church has a churchyard with a cemetery.

The church is from the Middle Ages.

=== Skrøbelev Church ===
Skrøbelev Church
- Skrøbelev Kirke
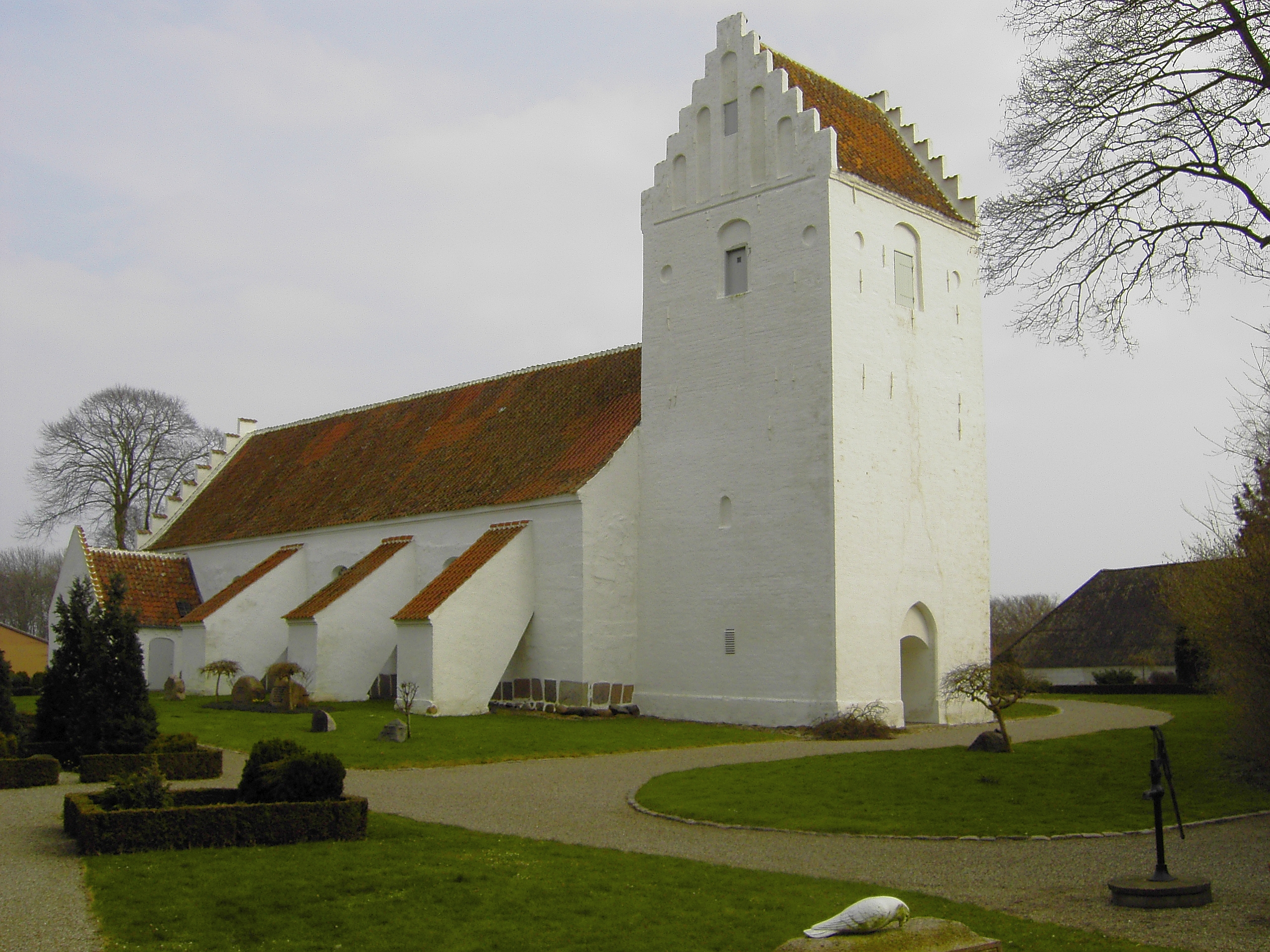
- Skrøbelev Church
- 54°55′25.23″N 10°45′1.24″E
- Location: Ny Skrøbelev, Denmark
- Denomination: Church of Denmark

History
- Founded: 1000s

Specifications
- Capacity: 200

Administration
- Diocese: Diocese of Funen
- Deanery: Langeland-Ærø Provsti
- Parish: Skrøbelev Parish

Skrøbelev Church is located in Ny Skrøbelev. It is the only national church in Skrøbelev Parish. The church has a churchyard with a cemetery.

The oldest parts of the church are from the late 1000s.

The votive ship is from 1991, built by Alfred Sørensen as a model of the schooner Agathe. The church's organ is from 1957.

=== Snøde Church ===
Snøde Church
- Snøde Kirke
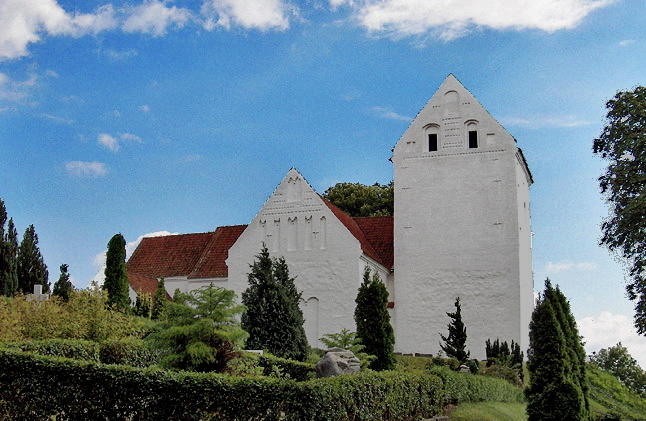
- Snøde Church
- 55°4′51.32″N 10°54′19.56″E
- Location: Snøde, Denmark
- Denomination: Church of Denmark

Administration
- Diocese: Diocese of Funen
- Deanery: Langeland-Ærø Provsti
- Parish: Snøde Parish

Snøde Church is located in Snøde. It is the only national church in Snøde Parish. The church has a churchyard with a cemetery.

The church was built in the Middle Ages.

=== Stoense Church ===
Stoense Church
- Stoense Kirke
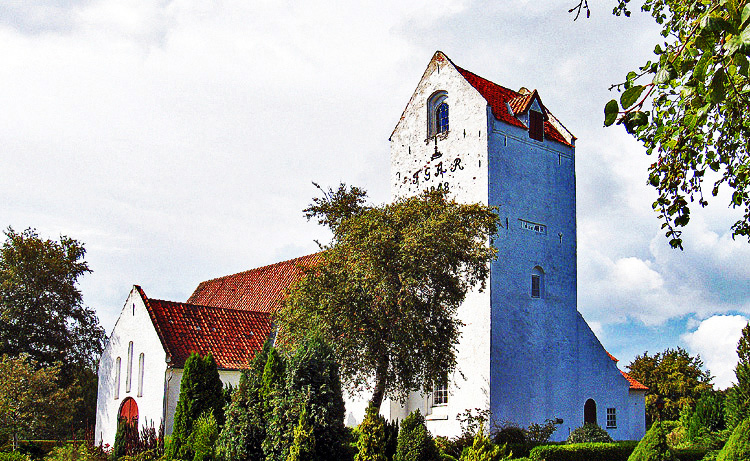
- Stoense Church
- 55°5′33.09″N 10°54′0.28″E
- Location: Snøde, Denmark
- Denomination: Church of Denmark

Administration
- Diocese: Diocese of Funen
- Deanery: Langeland-Ærø Provsti
- Parish: Stoense Parish

Stoense Church is located in the northern part of Snøde, in what used to be the village of Stoense. It is the only national church in Stoense Parish. The church has a churchyard with a cemetery.

The church was built in the Middle Ages, with later expansions, particularly in the 1600s and 1700s.

=== Strynø Church ===
Strynø Church
- Strynø Kirke
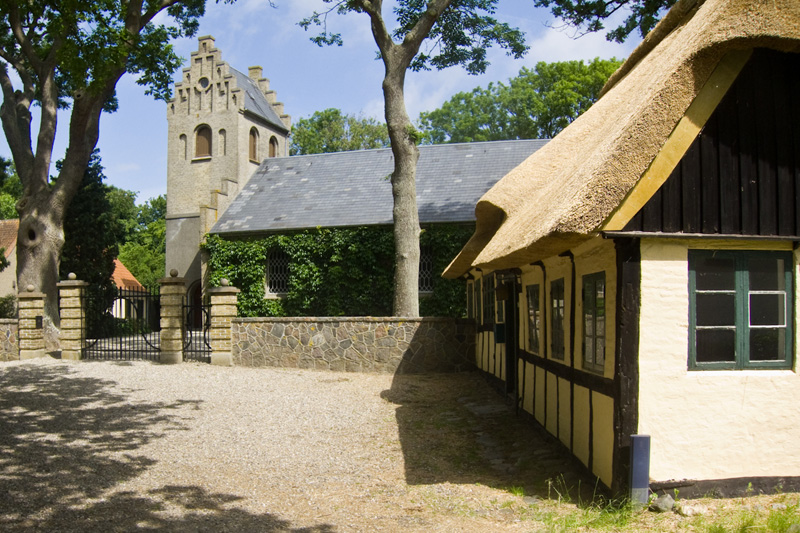
- Strynø Church
- 54°54′19.89″N 10°36′45.97″E
- Location: Strynø By, Denmark
- Denomination: Church of Denmark

Architecture
- Completed: 1867

Specifications
- Capacity: 280

Administration
- Diocese: Diocese of Funen
- Deanery: Langeland-Ærø Provsti
- Parish: Strynø Parish

Strynø Church is located in Strynø By on Strynø. It is the only national church in Strynø Parish. The church has a churchyard with a cemetery.

The current church is from 1867, though with parts from the old church building from 1589.

The altarpiece is from 1881 by J.E.C. Rasmussen from Marstal. The organ is from 1966.

=== Tranekær Church ===
Tranekær Church
- Tranekær Kirke
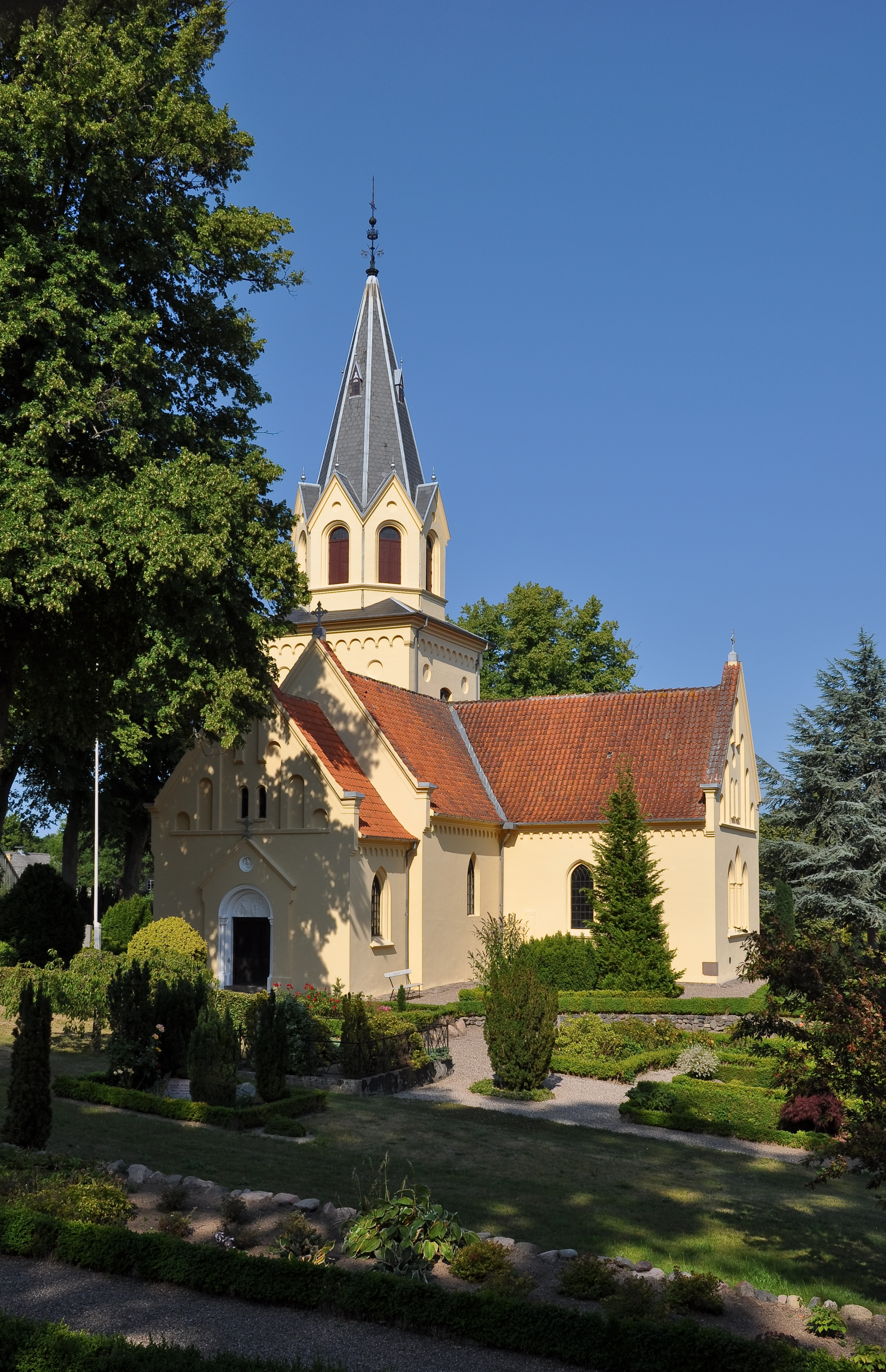
- Tranekær Church
- 54°59′46.81″N 10°50′30.94″E
- Location: Tranekær, Denmark
- Denomination: Church of Denmark

History
- Founded: Ca. 1450

Administration
- Diocese: Diocese of Funen
- Deanery: Langeland-Ærø Provsti
- Parish: Tranekær Parish

Tranekær Church is located in Tranekær. It is the only national church in Tranekær Parish. The church has a churchyard with a cemetery.

The church was built around 1450. An older church from the 11th-12th centuries was previously located where Tranekær Church stands, though no parts of the old church remain.

The church bells are from 1472 and 1791. The altarpiece is from 1847 and painted by Christoffer Wilhelm Eckersberg.

=== Tryggelev Church ===
Tryggelev Church
- Tryggelev Kirke
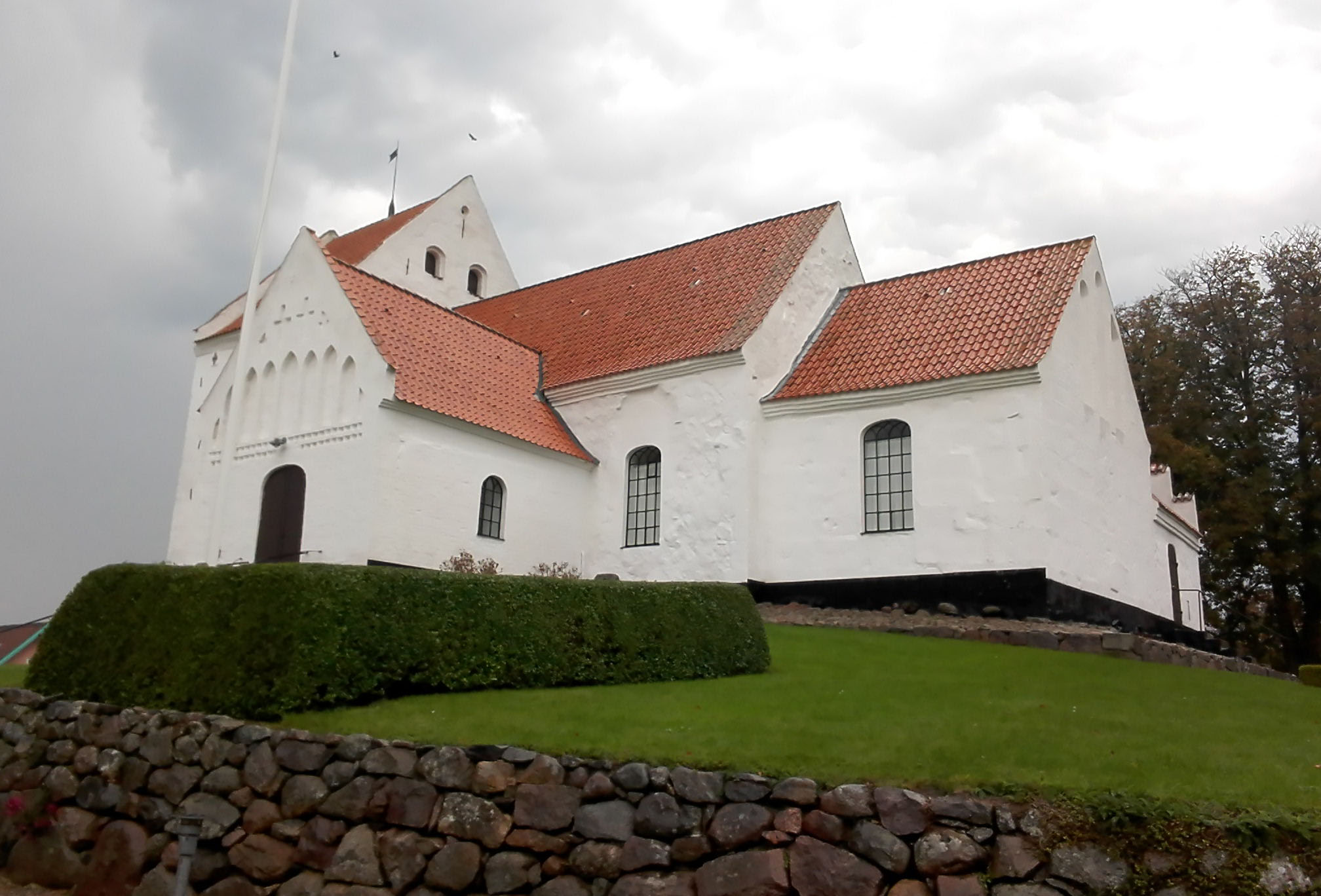
- Tryggelev Church
- 54°48′14″N 10°42′7.98″E
- Location: Tryggelev, Denmark
- Denomination: Church of Denmark

History
- Founded: Ca. 1200

Administration
- Diocese: Diocese of Funen
- Deanery: Langeland-Ærø Provsti
- Parish: Tryggelev Parish

Tryggelev Church is located in Tryggelev. It is the only national church in Tryggelev Parish. The church has a churchyard with a cemetery.

The oldest parts of the church is the choir and nave, built around 1200. From around 1400 to 1550 the church porch and sacristy were added. Construction of the tower began in 1530, but wasn't finished until 1646. The church underwent an extensive restoration in 1872 and an interior restoration in 2013–2014.

The church bell is from 1717, made by Conrad Klemann in Lübeck. The votive ship is from 1927 to 1928.

=== Tullebølle Church ===
Tullebølle Church
- Tullebølle Kirke
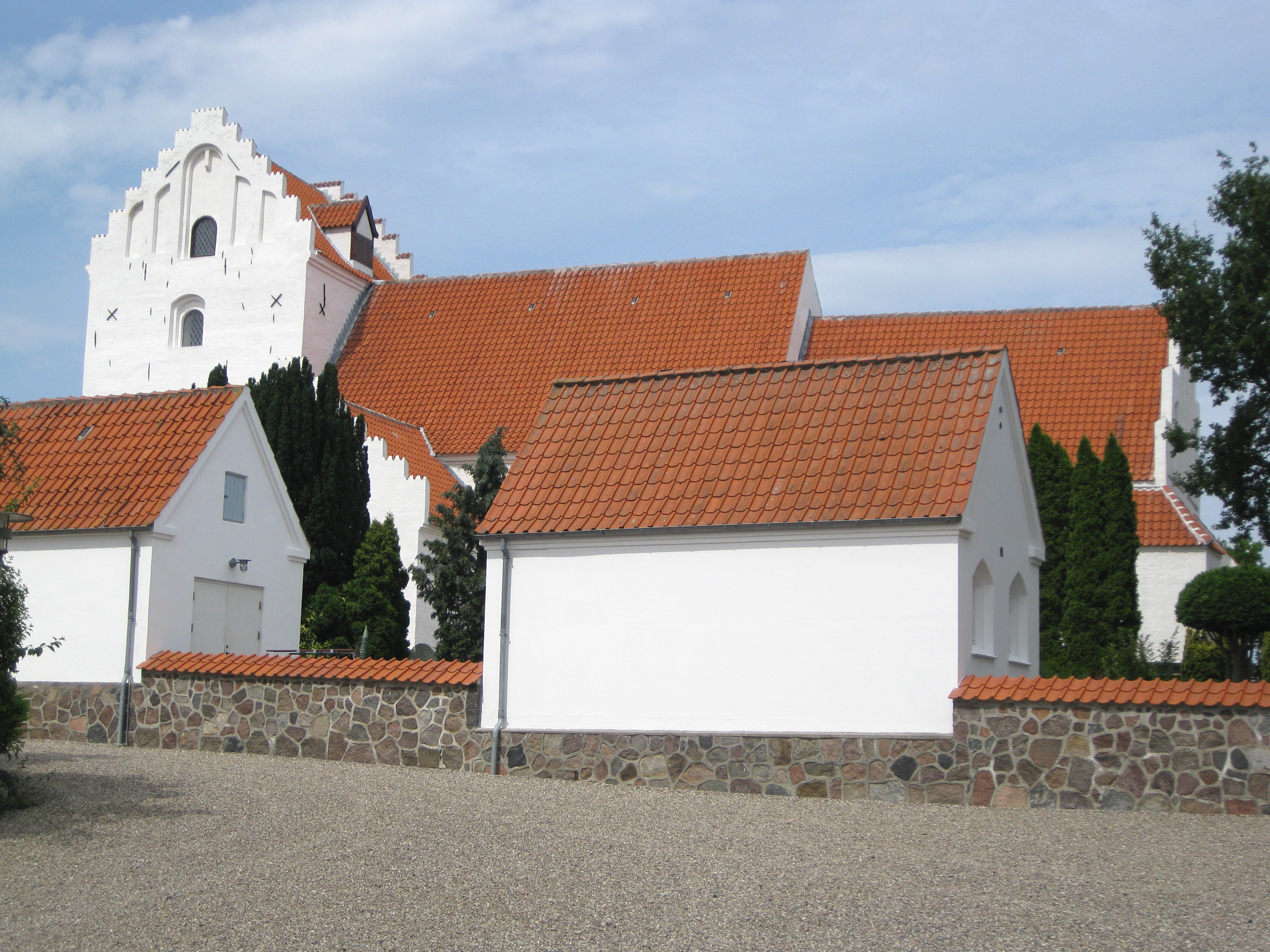
- Tullebølle Church
- 54°57′33.08″N 10°48′8.32″E
- Location: Tullebølle, Denmark
- Denomination: Church of Denmark

History
- Founded: Ca. 1200

Administration
- Diocese: Diocese of Funen
- Deanery: Langeland-Ærø Provsti
- Parish: Tullebølle Parish

Tullebølle Church is located in Tullebølle. It is the only national church in Tullebølle Parish. The church has a churchyard with a cemetery.

The oldest parts of the church was built around 1200. Several additions were added in the 1400s, including church porch, sacristy and tower. The church underwent restoration in 1830, 1875 and 1968–1969.

== Other churches ==
=== Mission House Bethesda ===
Mission House Bethesda
- Missionshuset Bethesda
- 54°56′15.65″N 10°42′56.62″E
- Location: Rudkøbing, Denmark
- Denomination: Inner Mission

History
- Founded: 1909

Mission House Bethesda is an Inner Mission church located in Rudkøbing.

Construction of the church began 7 May 1909, and it was built by architect Chr. Peder Bowmann.

=== Pentecost Church Rudkøbing ===
Pentecost Church Rudkøbing
- Pinsekirken Rudkøbing
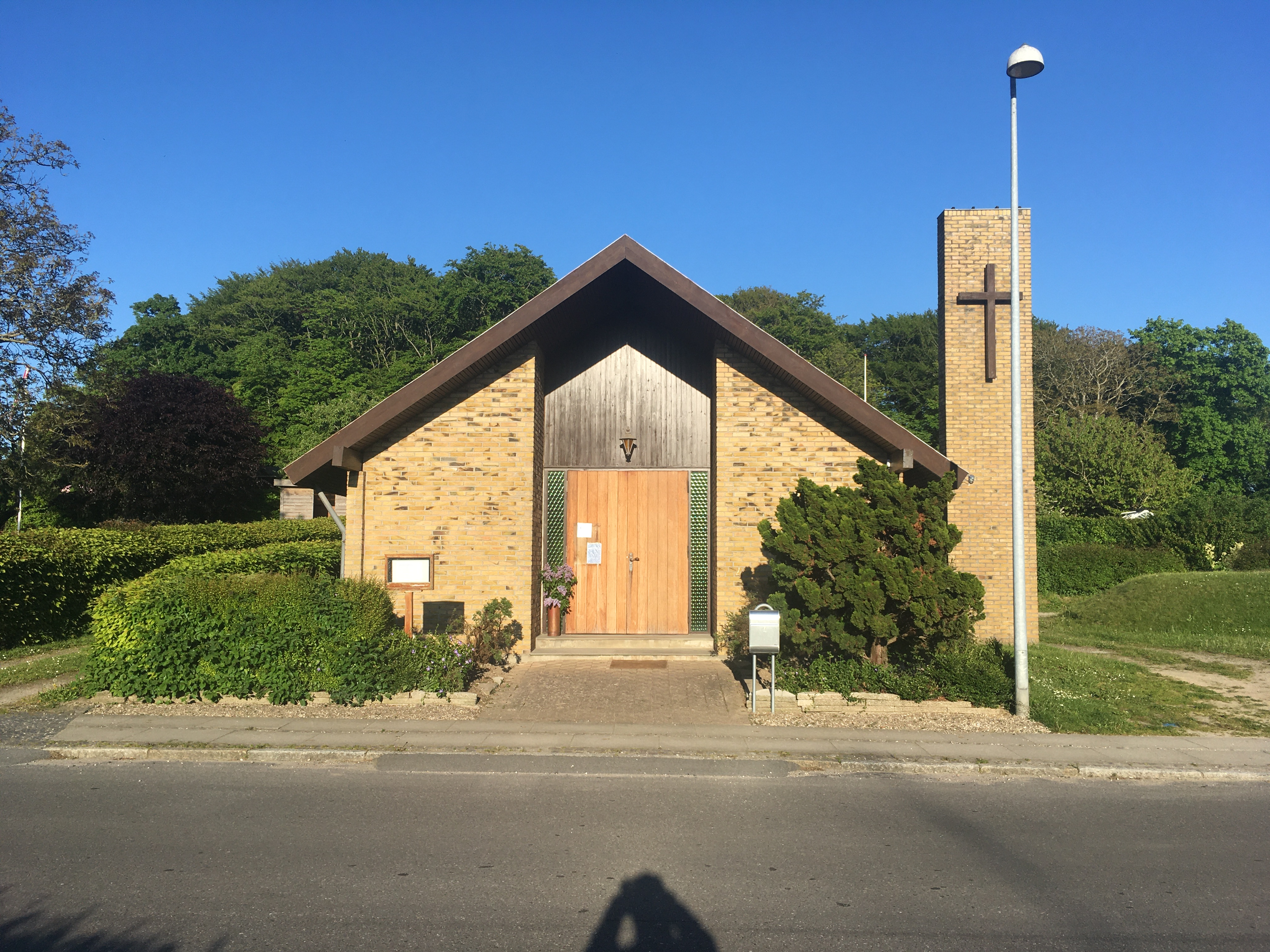
- 54°56′0.99″N 10°43′14.64″E
- Location: Rudkøbing, Denmark
- Denomination: Pentecostalism

Pentecost Church Rudkøbing is a Pentecost church located in Rudkøbing.

=== Saint Benedict's Chapel ===
Saint Benedict's Chapel
- Sankt Bendts Kapel
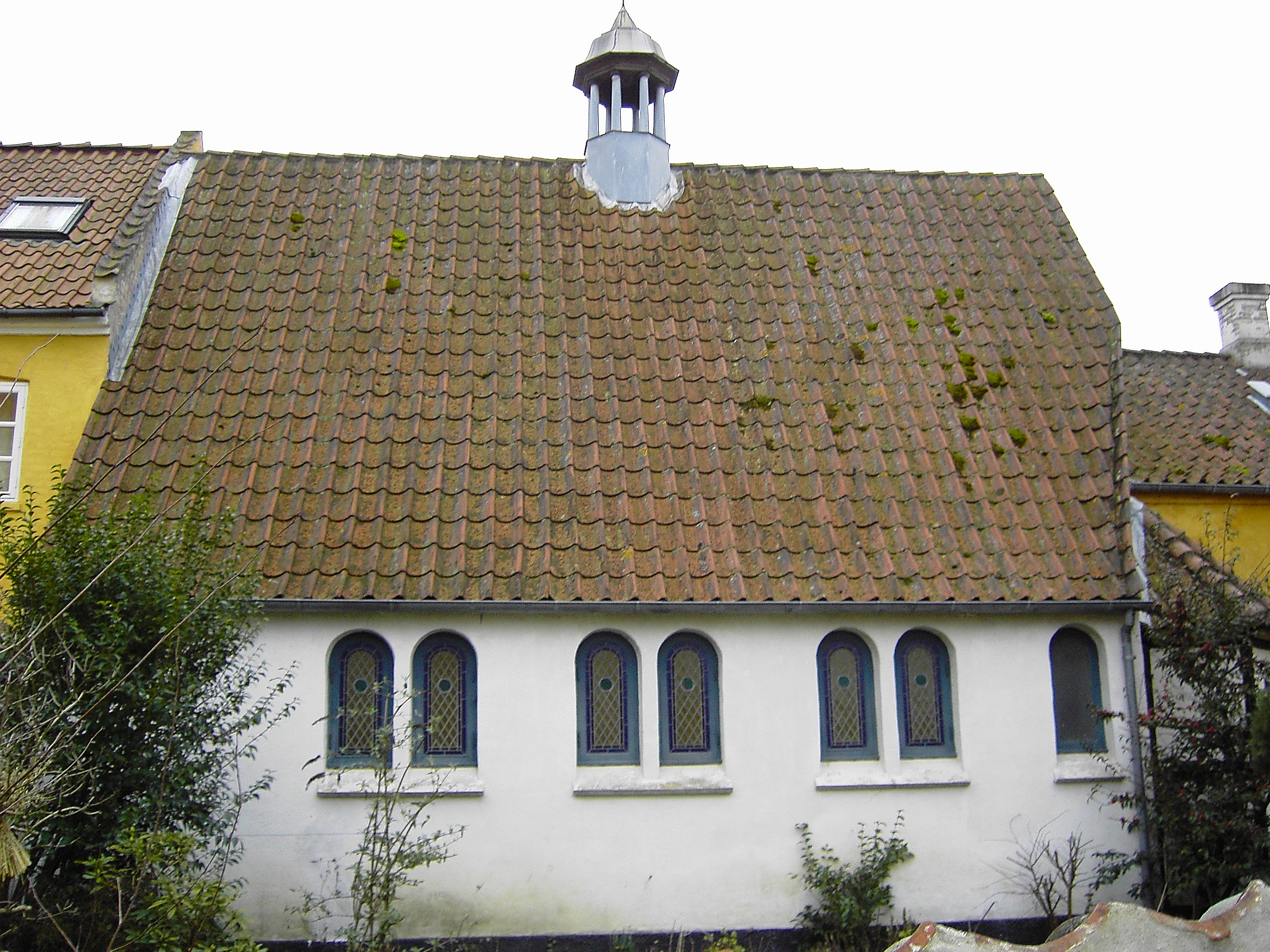
- Saint Benedict's Chapel
- 54°56′12.5″N 10°42′31.51″E
- Location: Rudkøbing, Denmark
- Denomination: Catholic Church

History
- Founded: 1925

Saint Benedict's Chapel is a Catholic church located in Rudkøbing.

The church was opened in 1925. It is named after Benedict of Nursia.
