= List of churches on Lolland =

This is a list of churches on the island of Lolland in southeastern Denmark.

== The list ==
| Name | Location | Year | Coordinates | Image | Refs |
|---|---|---|---|---|---|
| Arninge Church | Arninge | c. 1250 | 54°47′40″N 11°10′24″E | | |
| Avnede Church | Nakskov | c. 1390 | 54°49′39″N 11°11′46″E | | |
| Bandholm Church | Bandholm | 1874 | 54°50′13″N 11°28′11″E | | |
| Birket Church | Birket | c. 1350 | 54°53′25.8″N 11°19′54.83″E | | |
| Branderslev Church | Branderslev, Nakskov | c. 1200 | 54°52′20″N 11°08′20″E | | |
| Bregninge Church | Grønnegade | Pre-1200 | 54°52′56.28″N 11°28′24.84″E | | |
| Bursø Church | Bursø | 12th century | 54°44′11.7″N 11°29′19.6″E | | |
| Dannemare Church | Dannemare | 1897 | 54°45′42″N 11°11′19″E | | |
| Døllefjelde Church | Fjelde | Pre-1362 | 54°43′56.03″N 11°41′28.4″E | | |
| Engestofte Church | Engestofte | c. 1100 | 54°45′45″N 11°33′46.44″E | | |
| Errindlev Church | Errindlev | c. 1175 | 54°40′06″N 11°29′47″E | | |
| Fejø Church | Fejø | 1240 | 54°55′44″N 11°24′49″E | | |
| Fjelde Church | Fjelde | c. 1100 | 54°45′02.5″N 11°39′47.8″E | | |
| Fuglse Church | Holeby | 1595 | 54°42′28″N 11°30′49″E | | |
| Gloslunde Church | Dannemare | 1200-1250 | 54°45′19″N 11°13′23″E | | |
| Godsted Church | Godsted | Pre-1300 | 54°43′22.2″N 11°36′11″E | | |
| Græshave Church | Dannemare | 13th century | 54°46′36″N 11°13′40″E | | |
| Gurreby Church | Gurreby | 13th century | 54°48′30.4″N 11°13′32″E | | |
| Halsted Church | Halsted | c. 1100 | 54°50′49″N 11°14′26.5″E | | |
| Herredskirke Church | Nakskov | c. 1250 | 54°52′39.36″N 11°09′15.48″E | | |
| Herritslev Church | Herritslev | c. 1220 | 54°41′39.58″N 11°39′58.43″E | | |
| Hillested Church | Maribo | c. 1200 | 54°45′11.88″N 11°26′48.48″E | | |
| Holeby Church | Holeby | c. 1250 | 54°42′55.8″N 11°27′04.4″E | | |
| Horslunde Church | Horslunde | c. 1200 | 54°54′30.9″N 11°12′59.4″E | | |
| Hunseby Church | Hunseby | c. 1150 | 54°47′54.38″N 11°30′52.65″E | | |
| Kappel Church | Nakskov | c. 1464 | 54°46′25″N 11°01′58″E | | |
| Kettinge Church | Kettinge | Pre-1250 | 54°41′50.45″N 11°44′14″E | | |
| Købelev Church | Købelev | c. 1300 | 54°53′55″N 11°07′24″E | | |
| Krønge Church | Krønge | c. 1100 | 54°43′38″N 11°30′37″E | | |
| Landet Church | Søllested | c. 1220 | 54°45′33″N 11°16′45″E | | |
| Langø Church | Langø | 1901 | 54°48′44″N 11°00′56″E | | |
| Lille Løjtofte Church | Lille Løjtofte | c. 1250 | 54°52′46″N 11°10′15″E | | |
| Majbølle Church | Majbølle | c. 1250 | 54°50′00.9″N 11°44′07.2″E | | |
| Maribo Abbey | Maribo | 14th century | 54°46′21.5″N 11°30′00″E | | |
| Musse Church | Musse | c. 1200 | 54°43′0.07″N 11°39′44.21″E | | |
| Nebbelunde Church | Nebbelunde | c. 1200 | 54°42′33.05″N 11°23′08.71″E | | |
| Nakskov Church | Nakskov | c. 1400 | 54°42′33.05″N 11°23′08.71″E | | |
| Nordlunde Church | Nordlunde | c. 1300 | 54°52′42″N 11°12′57″E | | |
| Nysted Church | Nysted | c. 1300 | 54°39′53.4″N 11°43′56.33″E | | |
| Nøbbet Church | Nøbbet | 1908 | 54°55′42.7″N 11°16′19.2″E | | |
| Olstrup Church | Errindlev | c. 1200 | 54°40′24.7″N 11°27′54″E | | |
| Øster Ulslev Church | Øster Ulslev | c. 1225 | 54°41′56.7″N 11°37′36″E | | |
| Østofte Church | Nørreballe | c.1345 | 54°48′05″N 11°25′32″E | | |
| Radsted Church | Radsted | c. 1200 | 54°47′23.8″N 11°41′18.7″E | | |
| Ringsebølle Church | Rødby | c. 1220 | 54°41′46″N 11°25′29″E | | |
| Sakskøbing Church | Sakskøbing | c. 1275 | 54°48′00.8″N 11°39′05.9″E | | |
| Sandby Church | Sandby | c. 1250 | 54°52′25″N 11°05′30″E | | |
| Skørringe Church | Skørringe | c. 1200 | 54°45′17.7″N 11°22′26″E | | |
| Skovlænge Church | Skovlænge | | | | |
| Slemminge Church | Slemminge | c. 1100 | 54°56′22″N 11°37′29.6″E | | |
| Søllested Church | Søllested | c. 1100 | 54°49′04″N 11°16′13″E | | |
| Sundkirken | Sundby | 1993 | 54°45′41.04″N 11°50′22.92″E | | |
| Stokkemarke Church | Stokkemarke | c. 1250 | 54°50′05″N 11°21′43″E | | |
| Sundkirken | Sundby | 1993 | 54°45′41.04″N 11°50′22.92″E | | |
| Tågerup Church | Tågerup | c. 1220 | 54°40′42″N 11°27′12″E | | |
| Tårs Church | Tårs | c. 1100 | 54°49′52.32″N 11°48′27.24″E | | |
| Tillitse Church | Dannemare | c. 1220 | 54°45′58″N 11°09′27″E | | |
| Toreby Church | Toreby | c. 1200 | 54°45′21.6″N 11°46′53.03″E | | |
| Utterslev Church | Horslunde | c. 1200 | 54°55′16″N 11°11′34″E | | |
| Våbensted Church | Våbensted | 1100 | 54°47′21.84″N 11°35′0.23″E | | |
| Vantore Church | Vantore | 1906 | 54°30′41.1″N 11°47′42.5″E | | |
| Vestenskov Church | Vestenskov | c. 1250 | 54°47′21″N 11°05′38″E | | |
| Vester Ulslev Church | Vester Ulslev | c. 1300 | 54°41′25.26″N 11°34′40.49″E | | |
| Vesterborg Church | Vesterbrog | | | | |
| Vindeby Church | Horlunde | 14th century | 54°55′20″N 11°10′26″E | | |

== See also ==
- List of churches on Bornholm
- List of churches on Falster
