= Bandholm Church =

Church building in Lolland Municipality, Denmark

Coordinates: 54°50′13″N 11°28′11″E

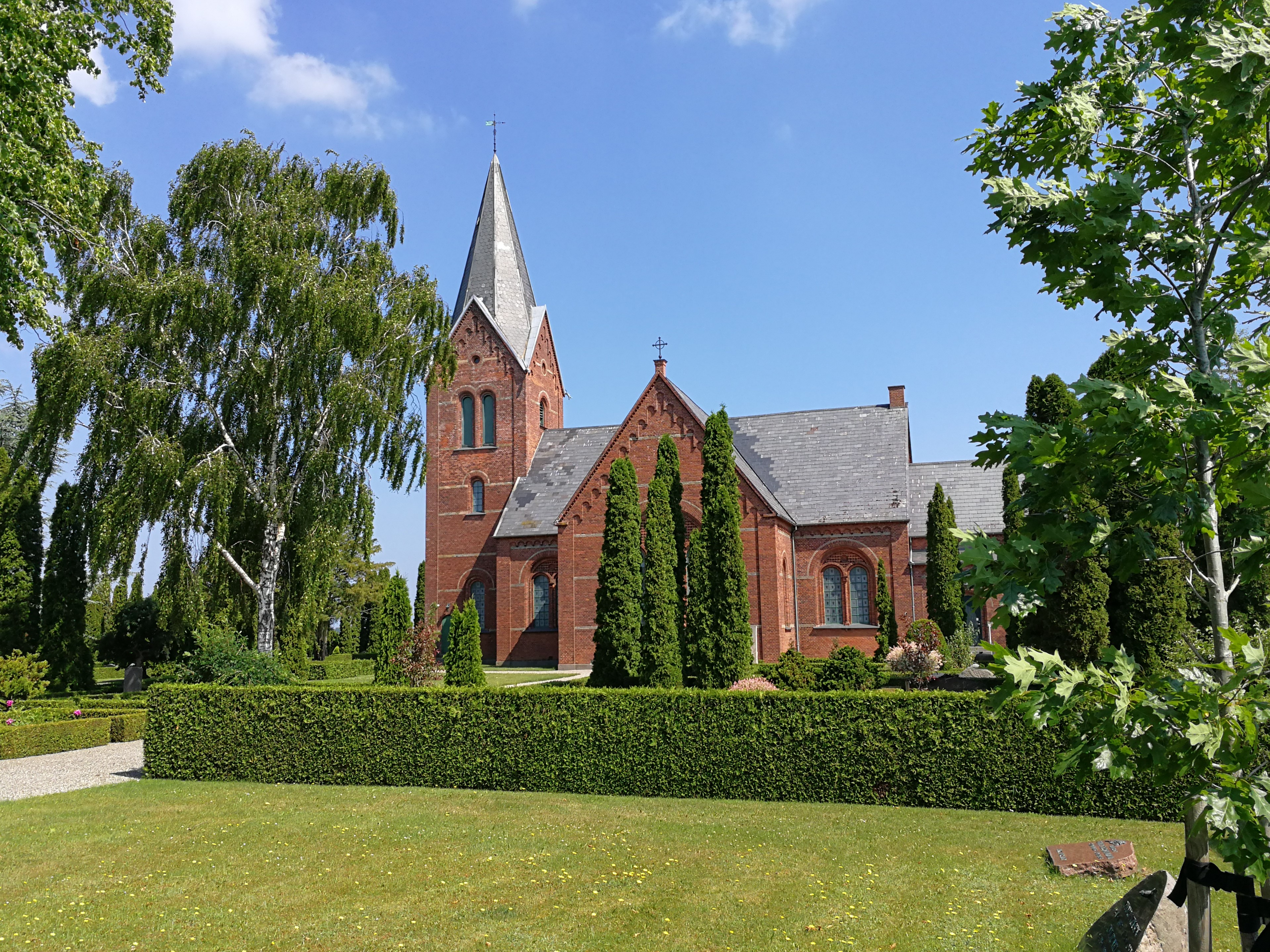
Bandholm Church, Lolland

Bandholm Church is a Church of Denmark parish church located in the harbor village of Bandholm some 8 km (5.0 mi) north of Maribo on the Danish island of Lolland. It was built in 1874 by Henrik Steffens Sibbern to a cruciform plan in the Romanesque Revival style. Built of red brick, it consists of a chancel, a nave and a tower with a conical spire.

== History ==
Bandholm was originally part of Østofte parish. As the population of the village increased, there was a need for a local church. Count Knuth of neighbouring Knuthenborg provided land for its construction on the corner of Birketvej and Koholtvej. The architect, H.S. Sibbern (1826–1901) was charged with the design of the church. He had also designed the various buildings in Knuthenborg Park. In 1881, Bandholm became a parish in its own right.

== Interior ==
There is no altarpiece in the church but three stained-glass windows decorate the east wall, the central one depicting the Last Supper. The church has a Busch organ, renovated by Starup & Søn in 1974.

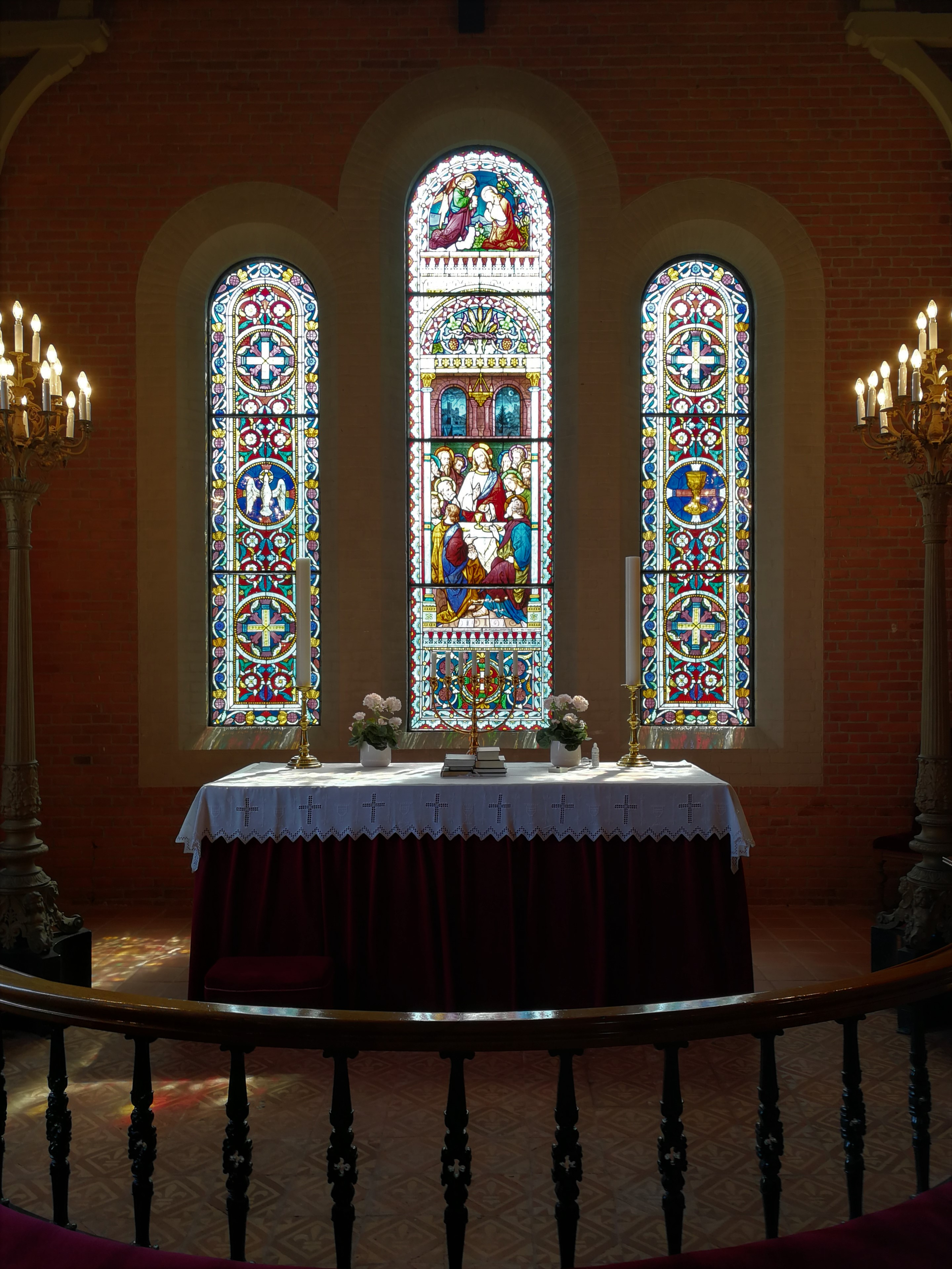
Stained-glass windows

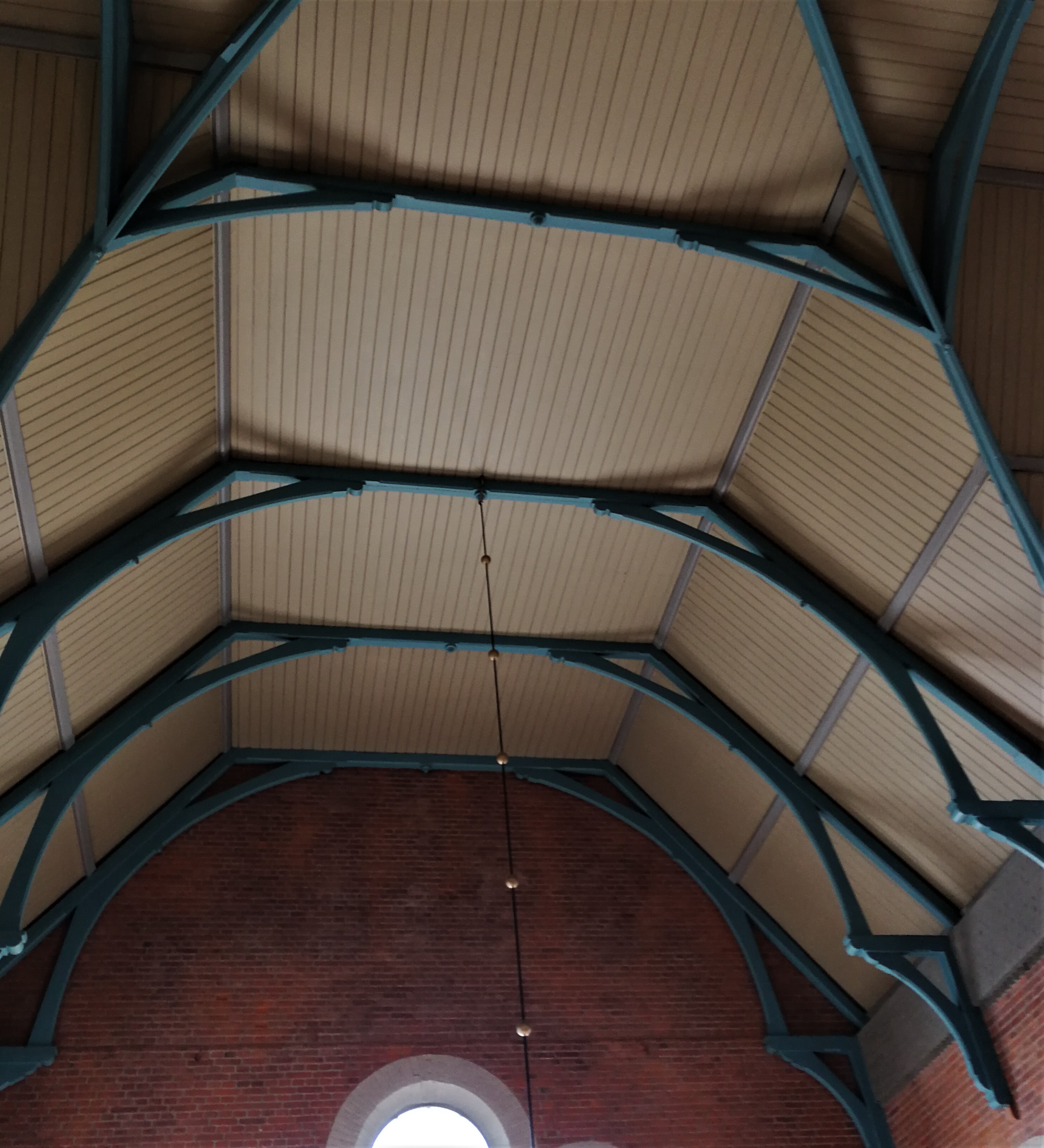
Ceiling

== See also ==
- List of churches on Lolland
