= Nørreballe =

- Town
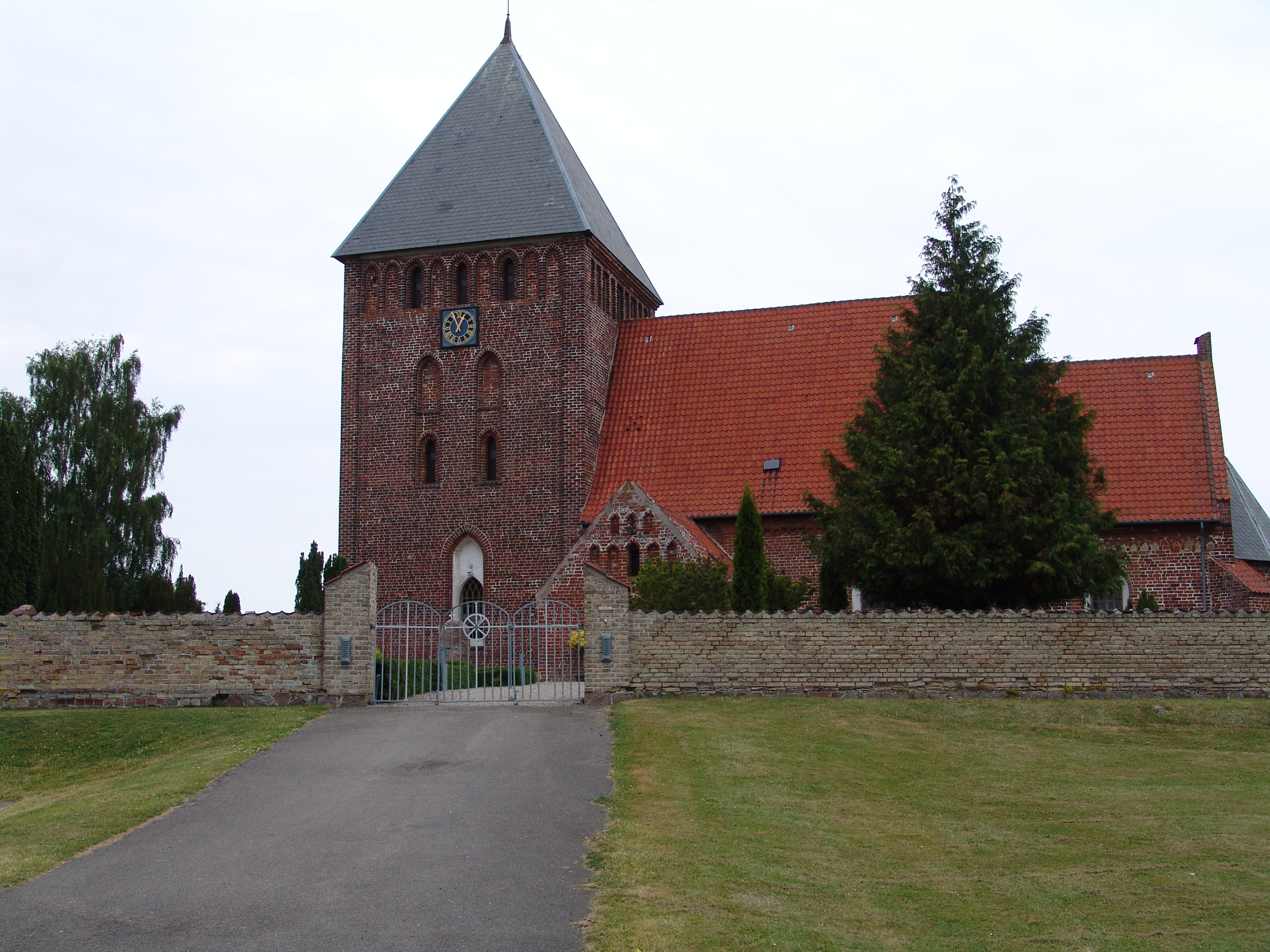
- Østofte Church in Nørreballe

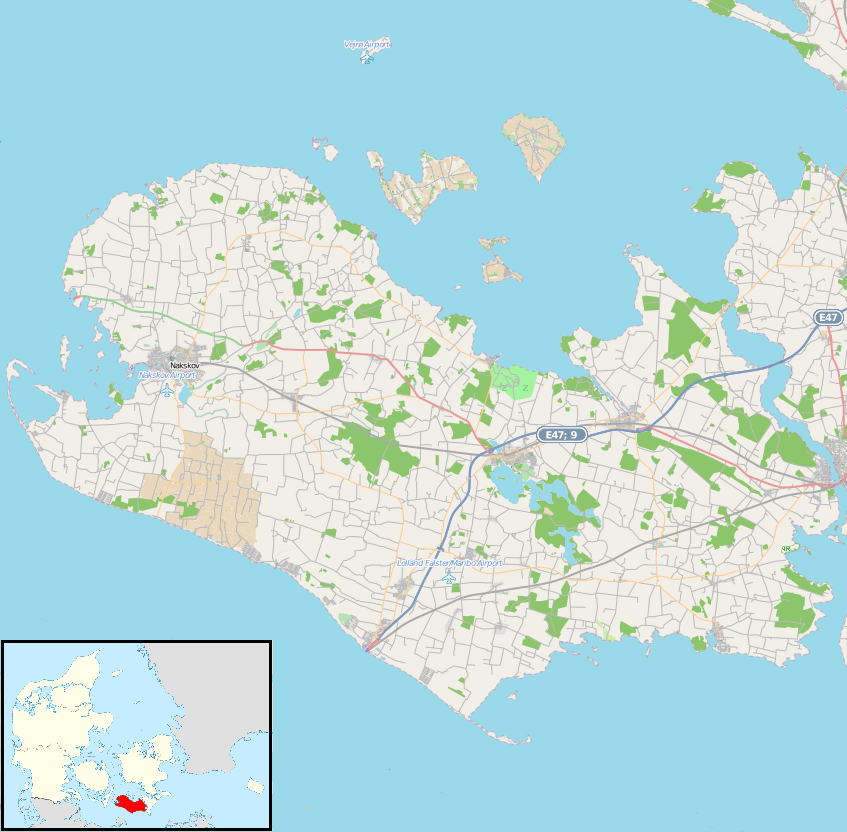
- Location on Lolland
- Coordinates: 54°48′24″N 11°25′49″E
- Country: Denmark
- Region: Zealand (Sjælland)
- Municipality: Lolland Municipality

Population (2026)
  - Total: 456
- Time zone: UTC+1 (CET)
  - Summer (DST): UTC+2 (CEST)

Nørreballe is a village on the Danish island of Lolland. With a population of 456 (1 January 2026), it is located 6 km (3.7 mi) northwest of Maribo. The village of Østofte with its 14th-century Østofte Church is now part of Nørreballe.

== Geography ==
Nørreballe is situated in central Lolland, 6 km (3.7 mi) northwest of Maribo and 20 km (12 mi) east of Nakskov. It lies along Route 9 (also known as Vestre Landevej) which connects with European route E47 to the west of Maribo. The road leading north out of the village, Kokoitvej, connects to the port of Bandholm, 5.1 kilometres (3.2 mi) to the northeast. To the northeast of the village is the Merret Skov woodland and Knuthenborg Safaripark. The settlements of Østofte to the south, Parup to the east, and Sørup to the west also form the local community. There are frequent bus services to Maribo and Nakskov. Tent camping is available at Lojet, which is situated between Søllested and Nørreballe, and is bounded by a forest. Similar to the surrounding villages of Håred, Erikstrup, Østofte, Sørup, Meltofte, and Stokkemarke, Nørreballe has pastures and farms.

== Landmarks ==
Østofte Church with its Romanesque apse, chancel and nave was expanded in 1656. The chancel is noted for some of the best-preserved medieval frescos on Lolland. Østofte Windmill, a post mill from 1641 located just west of Nørreballe, was in use until 1943. Restored in the 1990s, it is still fully functional. Nørreballe was once a station on the Maribo-Torrig Railway which operated from 1916 to 1941. Østofte Forsamlingshus, an assembly building along Kokoitvej, was built in 1981 according to the exterior of the building. Hotel Lolland lies in the eastern part of the village; a modern hotel, it has 16 rooms.

== The village today ==
Nørreballe is centred on a roundabout where the busy main road to Maribo crosses the road between Østofte and Bandholm. The only food store is located there, the last of the many shops which once prospered in the village. A number of garages and automobile sales outlets line the main road. In Østofte, there is a school (a branch of Maribo Landskole), a kindergarten, a sports hall and an open-air swimming pool. Clubs include a gymnastics association and a handball club.

There are plans to develop the aesthetic setting of the town, improve and expand existing infrastructure facilities, resolve traffic problems particularly around the school, provide for fitness centers, and improve internet connectivity.

== Local events ==
The popular local events held in the village are the annual neighborhood party, summer party, Christmas party and cycling competitions.
