= Big Joe =

Big Joe may refer to:

== People ==
- Joe Curtis (1882–1972), American college football player and coach
- Big Joe Duskin (1921–2007), American blues and boogie-woogie pianist
- Big Joe Krash, pseudonym of American rapper KRS-One
- Joseph Lonardo (1884–1927), American Mafia crime boss
- Big Joe Mufferaw, French Canadian folk hero
- Big Joe Nasty, ring name of Joe D'Acquisto, American professional wrestler
- Joe Roberts (actor) (1871–1923), American comic actor
- Joseph Todaro Jr. (born 1945 or 1946), American businessman and alleged Mafia crime boss
- Big Joe Turner (1911–1985), American blues shouter
- Joe Vagana (born 1975), New Zealand former rugby league footballer
- Joe van Niekerk (born 1980), South African former rugby union player
- Big Joe Williams (1903–1982), American Delta blues musician and songwriter
- Big Joe (reggae), Jamaican deejay born Joseph Spalding in 1955

== Space exploration ==
- Big Joe (Project Mercury), a subprogram of Project Mercury
- Big Joe 1, a Project Mercury mission
- Big Joe, a rock on Mars - see List of rocks on Mars

== Other uses ==
- Big Joe (bell), a bell in Saint Francis De Sales Catholic Church, Cincinnati, Ohio
- Big Joe (mascot), the mascot of the Ottawa Redblacks of the Canadian Football League
- Big Joe (dinosaur), the most complete and best-preserved Allosaurus fossil known to date
- Big Joe, Robert Een's band
- Big Joe, a novel by Samuel R. Delany

== See also ==
- Joseph Massino (born 1943), American former Mafia crime boss nicknamed "Big Joey"
