= Stokkemarke Parish =

Parish in Lolland Municipality, Denmark

Stokkemarke Parish Stokkemarke Sogn
- Parish
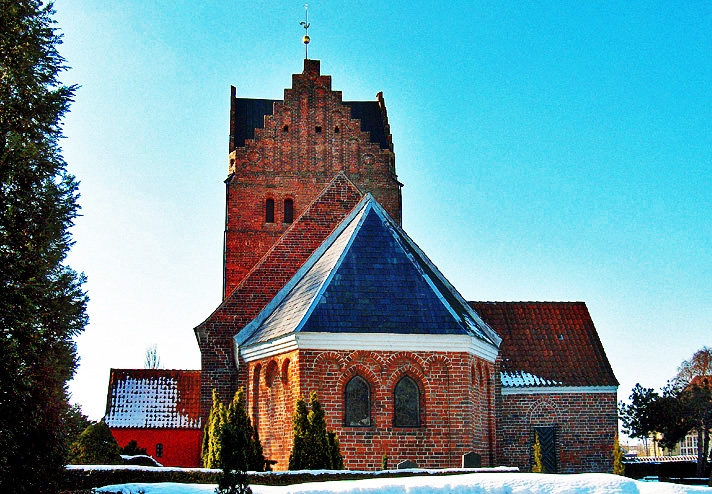
- Stokkemarke Church

- The parish within Lolland Municipality
- Country: Denmark
- Region: Zealand
- Municipality: Lolland Municipality
- Diocese: Lolland-Falster

Population (2025)
  - Total: 933
- Parish number: 7639

Stokkemarke Parish (Danish: Stokkemarke Sogn) is a parish in the Diocese of Lolland-Falster in Lolland Municipality, Denmark. The parish contains the town of Stokkemarke.
