= Tågerup Church =

Coordinates: 54°40′42″N 11°27′12″E

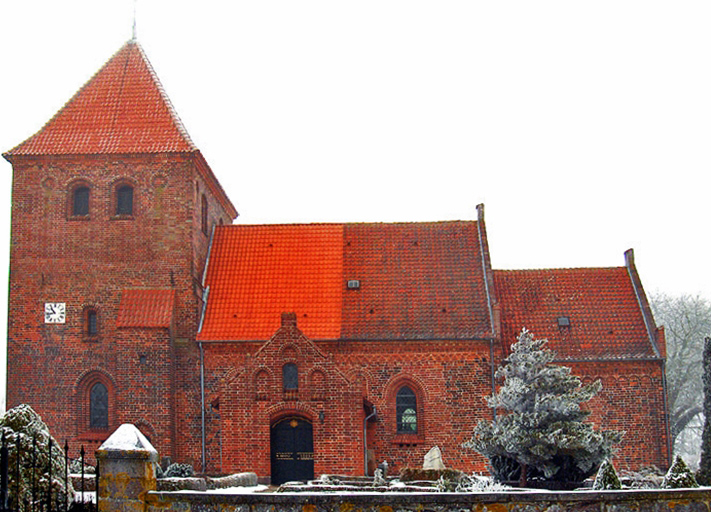
Tågerup Church, Lolland

Tågerup Church is a Romanesque parish church located 4 km southeast of Rødby on the Danish island of Lolland. Dating from the beginning of the 13th century, its nave is richly decorated with early 16th-century frescos painted by the Brarup workshop.

== History ==
The church was originally dedicated to Our Lady as documented in a letter of indulgence from 1470. An altar dedicated to the Virgin Mary attracted large numbers of pilgrims on the Feast of the Annunciation until 1636. Little is known about the church's early ownership apart from the fact that the Crown had clerical appointment rights before the Reformation. The church remained under the Crown until 1725 when it was transferred to Emmerence von Levetzau together with Aalholm and Bremersvold. It continued to be owned by Bremersvold until it gained independence in 1911.

== Architecture ==
The church consists of a Romanesque chancel and nave, a Gothic tower and a more recent porch, all built in red brick. The chancel has lesenes on the east corners and a sloping base. The east gable's lower wall is engraved with crosses and emblems. There is a Romanesque window at the centre of the gable while a stilted arch frieze with saw-toothed courses decorates the gable at the lower roof level. A round-arched door on the south side of the nave is also topped with an arched frieze. The door on the north side has been bricked in. Several round-arched windows have survived. In the Late-Gothic period, a six-sectioned vault was added to the chancel while two cross-vaults covered the nave. The tower, also a Late-Gothic addition, is the same width as the nave and has a pyramidal spire. Rather drastic repairs were carried out by Hans Jørgen Holm in 1891-93.

== Interior ==
The altarpiece contains a painting of Christ walking on water by Anton Dorph in a large Gothic frame. The pulpit in the Renaissance style is from 1586. There is a chancel-arch cross from the first half of the 15th century and another from around 1500 with a finely carved figure of Christ. Near the entrance, the Romanesque marble font with sculpted faces around the bowl is from Gotland.

== Frescos ==
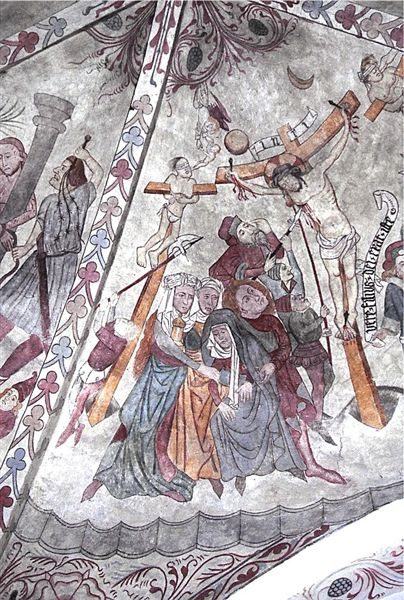
Crucifixion scene on the chancel vault

The church is noted for its frescos. Those in the vaults of the nave and the chancel were uncovered and restored by Jacob Kornerup in the 1880s. Further restoration work was completed by Egmost Otto Lind in 1943. The frescos in the chancel, the oldest, are from the mid-15th century. Christ is depicted sitting on three rainbows while Mary, kneeling and bare-breasted, calls him. John wears a camel hide. The symbols of the Evangelists surround the figure of Christ who is topped by a crown of thorns and a cross. The text reads "VENITE BENEDICTI PATRIS" and "ITE MALEDICTI IN". The style is simpler than normal with Christ's wounds depicted merely as small blots. The south segment depicts Pilate with a bowl of water. To the west, there are scenes of the whipping and the crucifixion with the two other victims and other figures including Mary and Mary Magdelene with a jug of ointment. The caption reads "Vere filius dei erat isle". The north segment displays scenes of the entombing and the resurrection.

The frescos in the nave are from the early 16th century and are attributed to the Brarup workshop. In the first bay, there are scenes of the Creation with the sun and a comet while God stands with the moon in his hands. There are fish and a shrimp in the foreground as well as a mermaid. To the south, God is creating animals including a goose, a dove, a crane and deer. In the south segment, Adam and Eve are created. The text reads "ADAM PRIMUS HOMO DAMPNAVIT SECULO POMO". The west segment presents the Admonition and the Fall while in the centre an angel stands with a hand organ. The text reads " HIC ADAM ET EVA DECELTI SUNT A DRACONE". The Banishment in the north segment is accompanied by a text reading "HIC EXPELLANTUR DE PARADISO AB ANGLO CUM FLIENTE GLADIO". Adam, in everyday clothing, has an axe in his belt and is about the till the earth. Eve is sitting with her children, one with a top and a whip.

The frescos from the Brarup workshop are quite different in style from those of the Elmelunde Master. God is not stereotyped. Like those from Isenfjord, they have energy. Eve, when working, holds the spindle correctly. In the scenes of the Banishment, Adam and Eve take long strides in contrast to Elmelunde where they are passive and static. In the illustration of the Fall and the Banishment, there are scenes of the Inverted World: a man shears the tail of a horse while another puts horseshoes on a cat. Both are based on items from Proverbes et rimes from 1480. Similar images can be seen in the churches of Hyllested, Brarup and Hästveda.

An older fresco of the Pietà can be seen on the east wall behind the altar. Mary is sitting with her dead son on her lap. The depiction of expression of despair is outstanding among Danish frescos. In 2005, a number of other frescos were discovered on the east wall, possibly representing the faces of other figures associated with the crucifixion. The altarpiece has been repositioned on the north wall so that the east-wall frescos can be more easily seen.

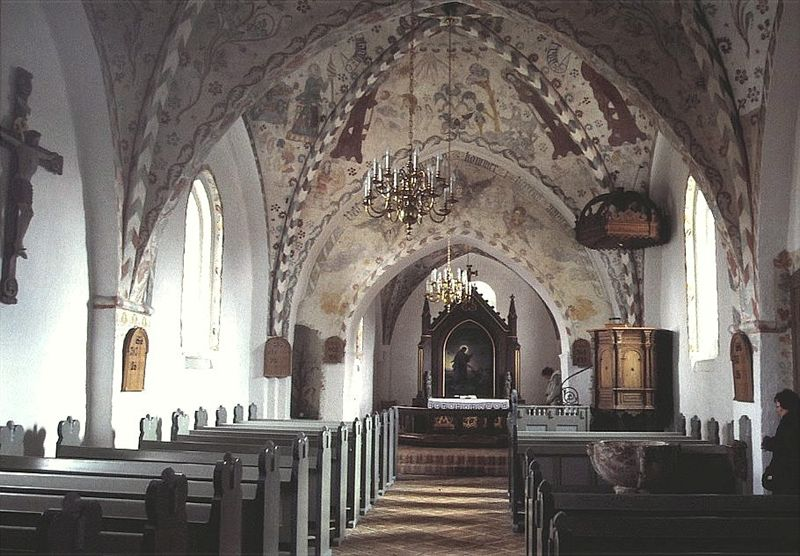
The richly decorated nave

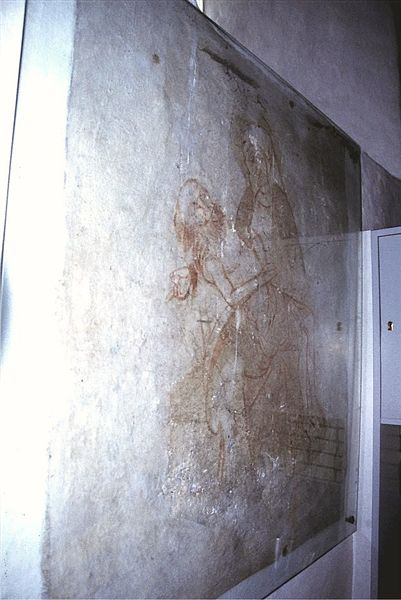
East wall Pietà

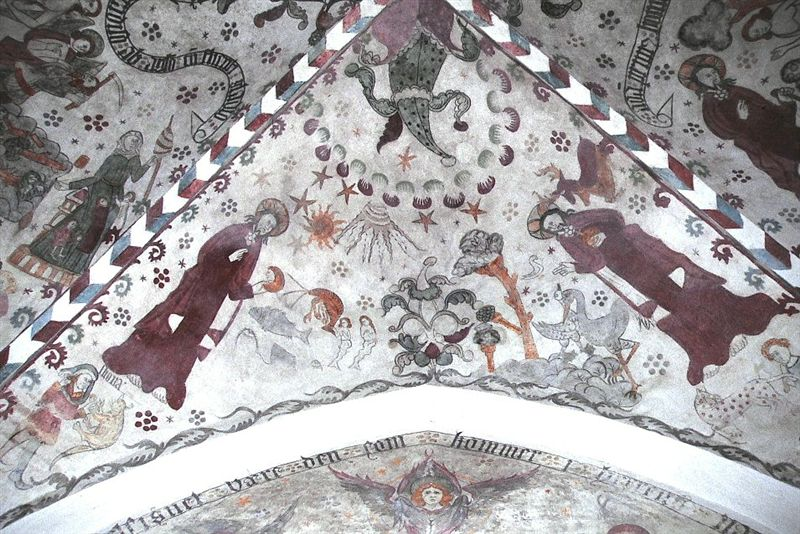
Nave vault: Creation of fish and fowl

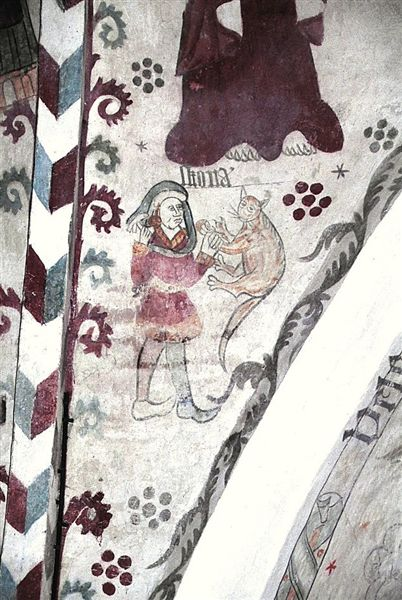
Nave vault: Man shoeing a cat

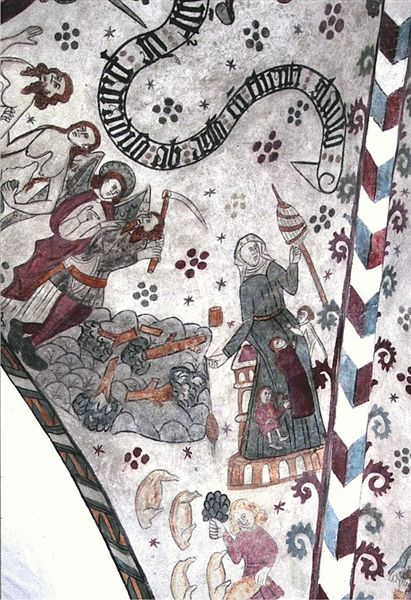
Nave vault: Labour

== Runestone ==
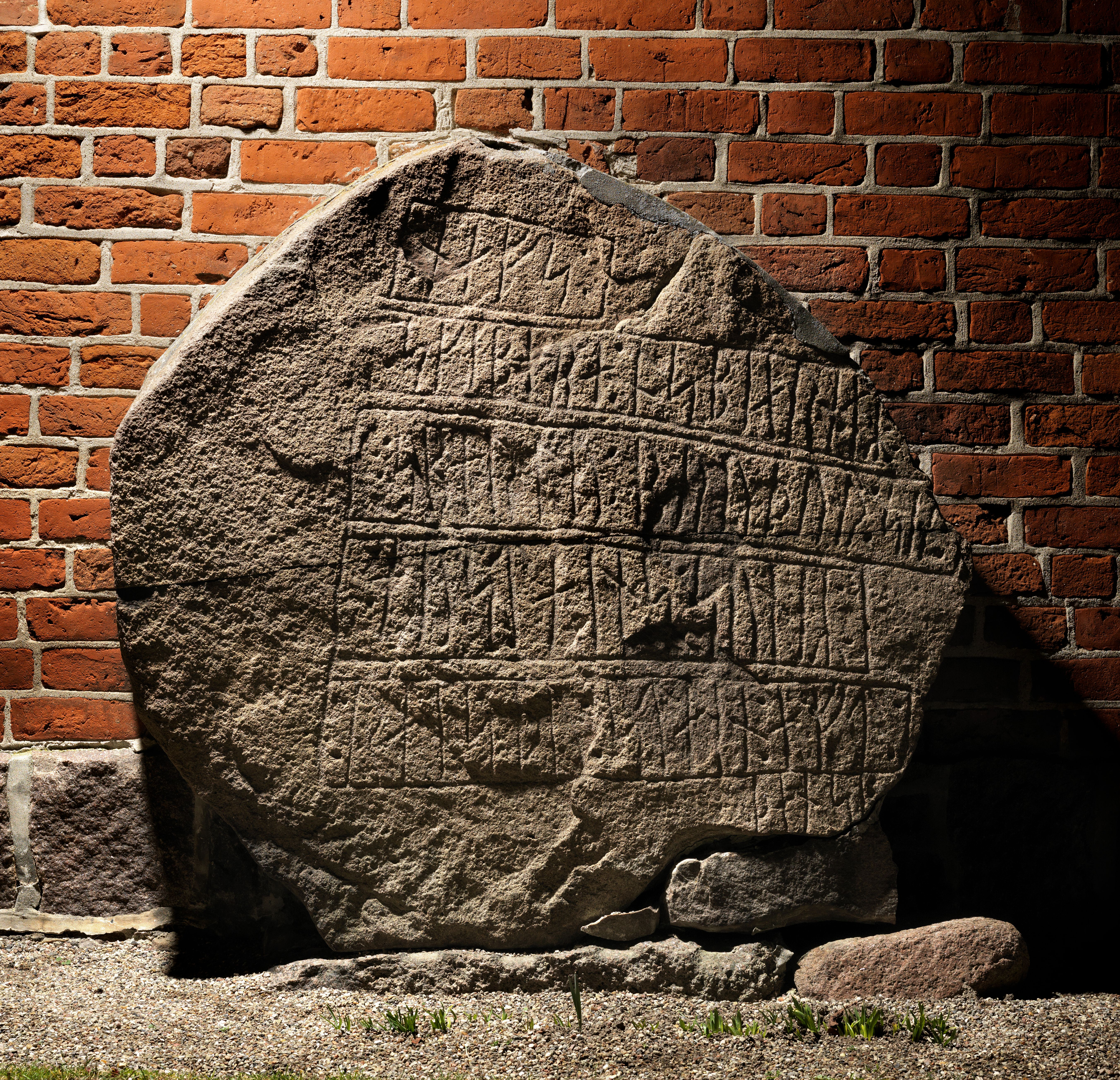
The Tågerup Runestone.

On the outer wall of the porch there is a runestone from the Viking period with an inscription which, when translated, reads: "Eysteinn's sons raised this stone in memory of Sperla, their brother, Ásbjǫrn Neb's seaman." The runestone was discovered on a field belonging to Tågerup Reectory. It was installed in 1869.

== See also ==
- List of churches on Lolland
