= Avnede Church =

Coordinates: 54°47′40″N 11°10′24″E

- Avnede Kirke
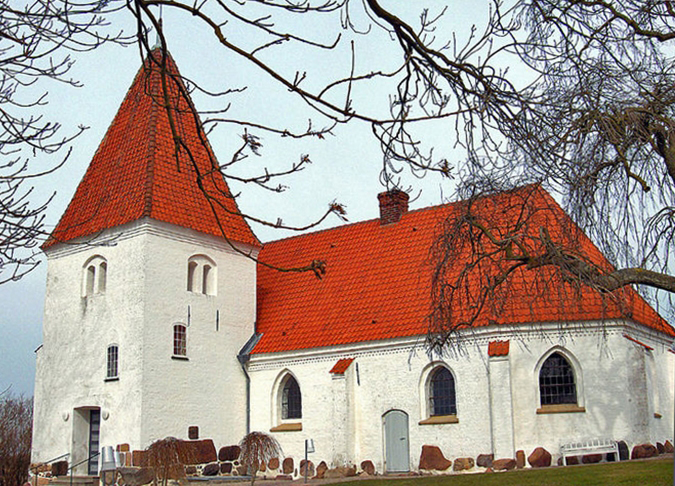
- Avnede Church
- Location: Store Avnede, Lolland
- Country: Denmark
- Denomination: Church of Denmark

Architecture
- Style: Gothic architecture

Administration
- Diocese: Diocese of Lolland–Falster
- Parish: Avnede Sogn

Avnede Church is a Gothic church located some 7 km (4.3 mi) southeast of Nakskov on the Danish island of Lolland. Frescos discovered on the chancel arch during repairs in 2009 are now being restored by the National Museum.

== History ==
Avnede Church was originally a wooden structure, probably one of the first to be built on Lolland in the early 11th century. It was located near a spring known in pre-Christian times and later Christianized as St Lawrence's spring. It was well known for the powerful effects of its waters. The church itself was also originally dedicated to St Lawrence. Today's stone building dates from the end of the 14th century. Apart from a short period in the 16th century, it was annexed to Halsted Church. Together with Halsted, in 1719 it was transferred to the Juellinge barony, created in honor of Jens Juel, and was subsequently owned by members of the Juel-Vind family. The church gained its independence in 1957.

== Architecture ==
The church was built in the Gothic style with a nave and a chancel with a three-sided east wall. The tower was added slightly later. The pyramidal spire is from c. 1770. The pulpit from 1580 is decorated with the 10 virtues which were restored in c. 1950 after being painted over for centuries.

== See also ==
- List of churches on Lolland
