= Købelev Church =

Coordinates: 54.8990°N 11.1237°E

- Købelev Kirke
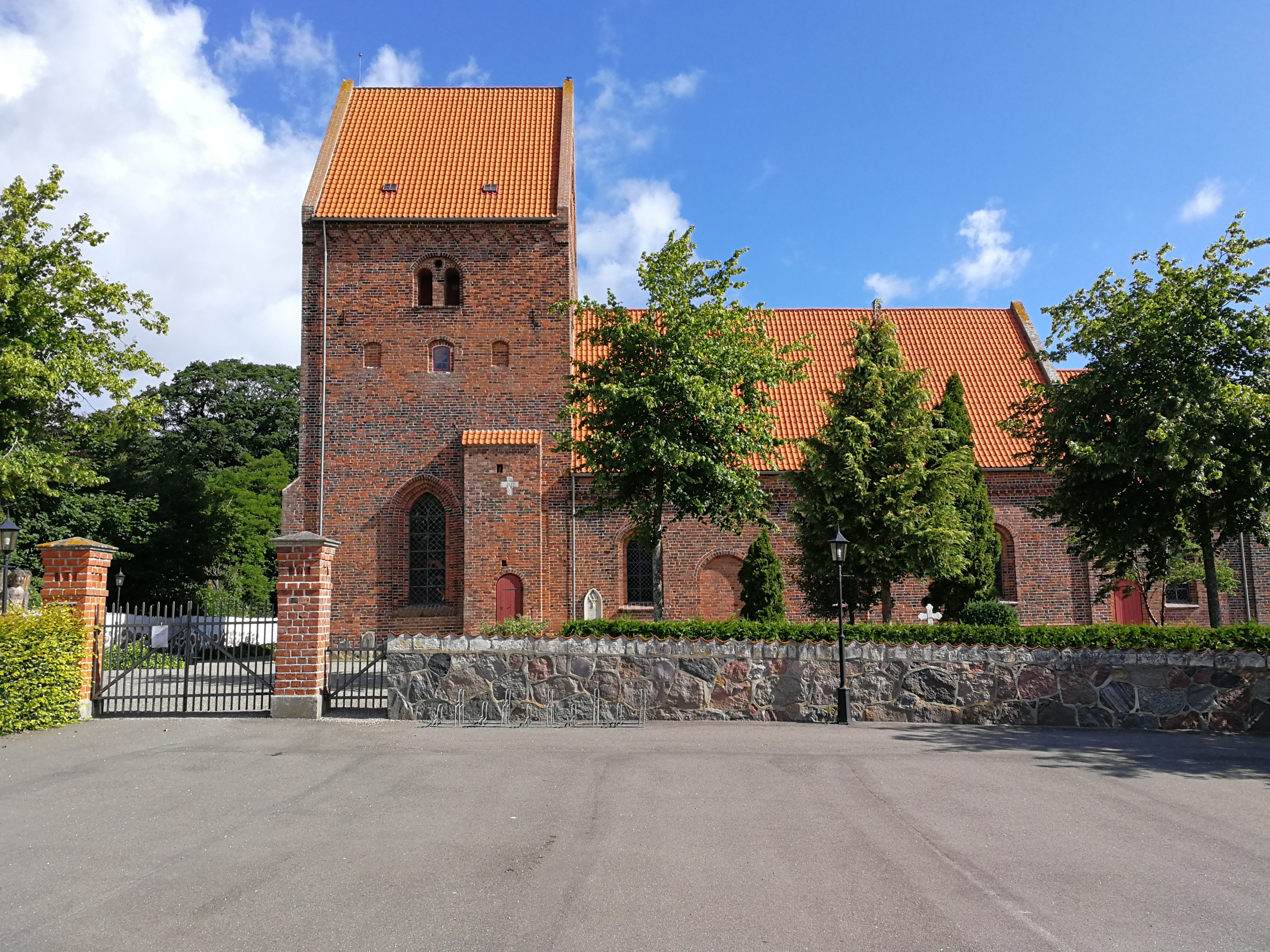
- Købelev Church
- Location: Købelev, Lolland
- Country: Denmark
- Denomination: Church of Denmark

Architecture
- Style: Romanesque architecture, Gothic architecture

Administration
- Diocese: Diocese of Lolland–Falster
- Parish: Købelev Sogn

Købelev Church is a parish church in the village of Købelev on Lolland in southeastern Denmark. It consists of a Late Romanesque chancel and nave and a Late Gothic tower. The poets Poul Martin Møller and Christian Winther grew up in the associated rectory to the west of the church.

== History ==
The church was probably built around 1300. In the Middle Ages, it was dedicated to St. Nicolas, since it was then located close to the sea. The church was both before and after the Reformation owned by the Crown. It later passed into the ownership of the Barony of Frederiksdal.

In 1801, the church was sold to the local residents of the parish. Rasmus Møller was the following year appointed as parish priest of Købelev and Vindeby. He was the father of Poul Martin Møller, and his second marriage was to Hanne Winther, widow of the parish priest in Fernsmark, who was the mother of Christian Winther. Poul Martin Møller and Christian Winther grew up together in the rectory and later went to school together in the Latin school in Nykøbing on Falster. Rasmus Møller was in 1820 appointed as stiftsprovst of Lolland Falster and succeeded P. O. Boisen as Bishop of Lolland-Falster in 1831.

Ludvig Børresen (1799–1867), who had for the past 20 years published the weekly magazine Den danske Bondeven, was in 1854 appointed as parish priest in Købelev. He was in 1867 succeeded by Frederik Helveg.

In 1953, Købelev Church was converted into a self-owning institution.

== Architecture ==
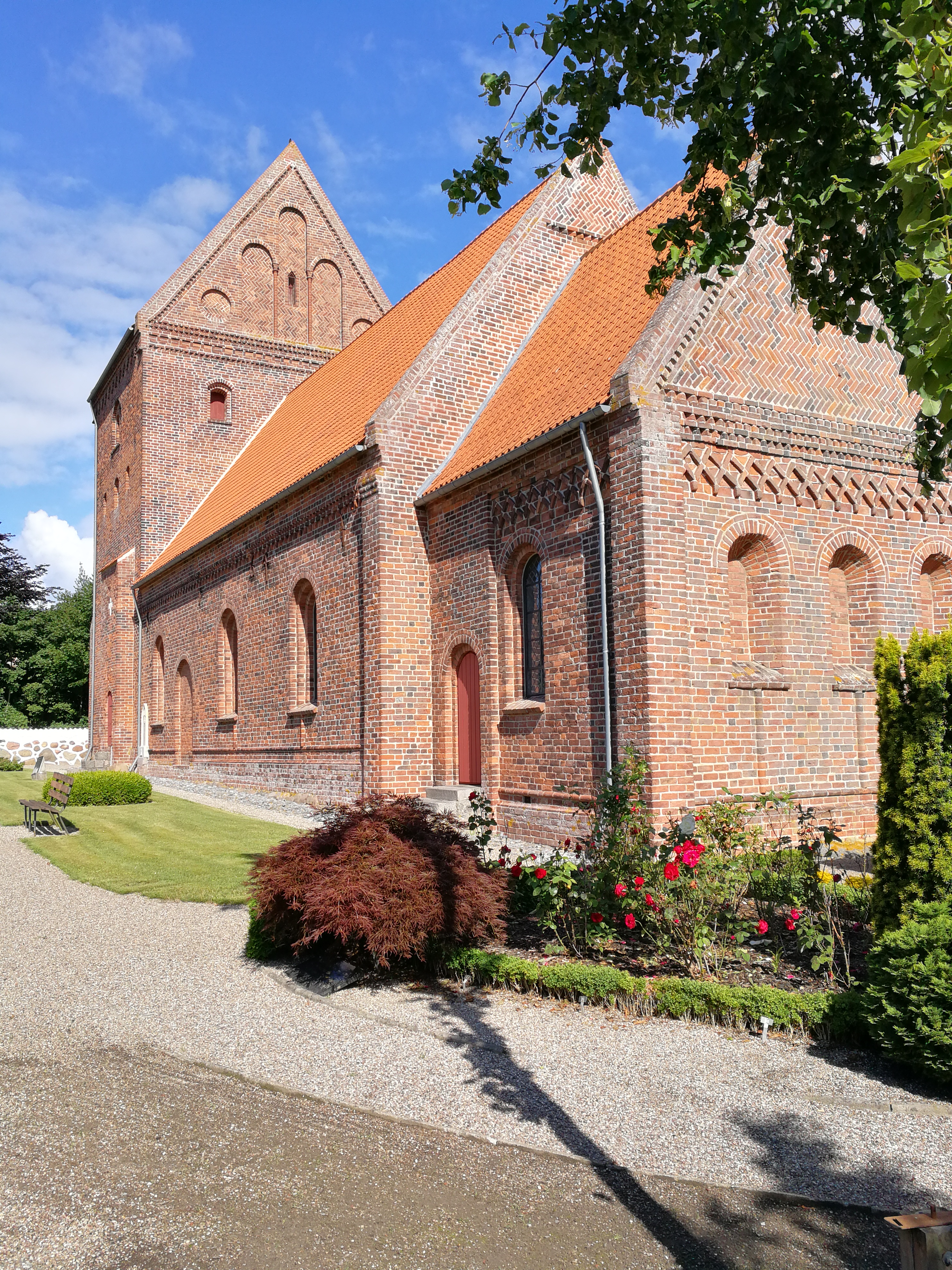
East gable

The chancel and nave are built in red brick. The east gable has corner lesenes and contains three bricked-in arched windows topped by an arch frieze. Both the original doors to the north and south, as well as a third door for the priest in the south wall of the chancel, have been bricked up. The gables of the Late Gothic tower were rebuilt in connection with a renovation of the church in 1863. An earlier pyramidical tower was also removed at this point, and the windows in the flank walls were enlarged.

== Interior ==
The flat wooden ceiling was in the Late Gothic period replaced with a star-vaulted ceiling. The altarpiece contains a painting by Christopher Wilhelm Eckersberg from 1841. The pulpit is from 1593 and decorated with hjørnehermer and reliefs of the evangelists. An epitaph from 1657 commemorates parish priest Poul Poulsen Danchel (d. 1668) there is also a portrait painting of a priest by Axel Hou. The Romanesque limestone font was imported from Gotland.

== See also ==
- List of churches on Lolland

== Churchyard ==
The church is surrounded by a churchyard. Notable burials include the former priest Frederik Helveg.
