= Bandholm =

- Town
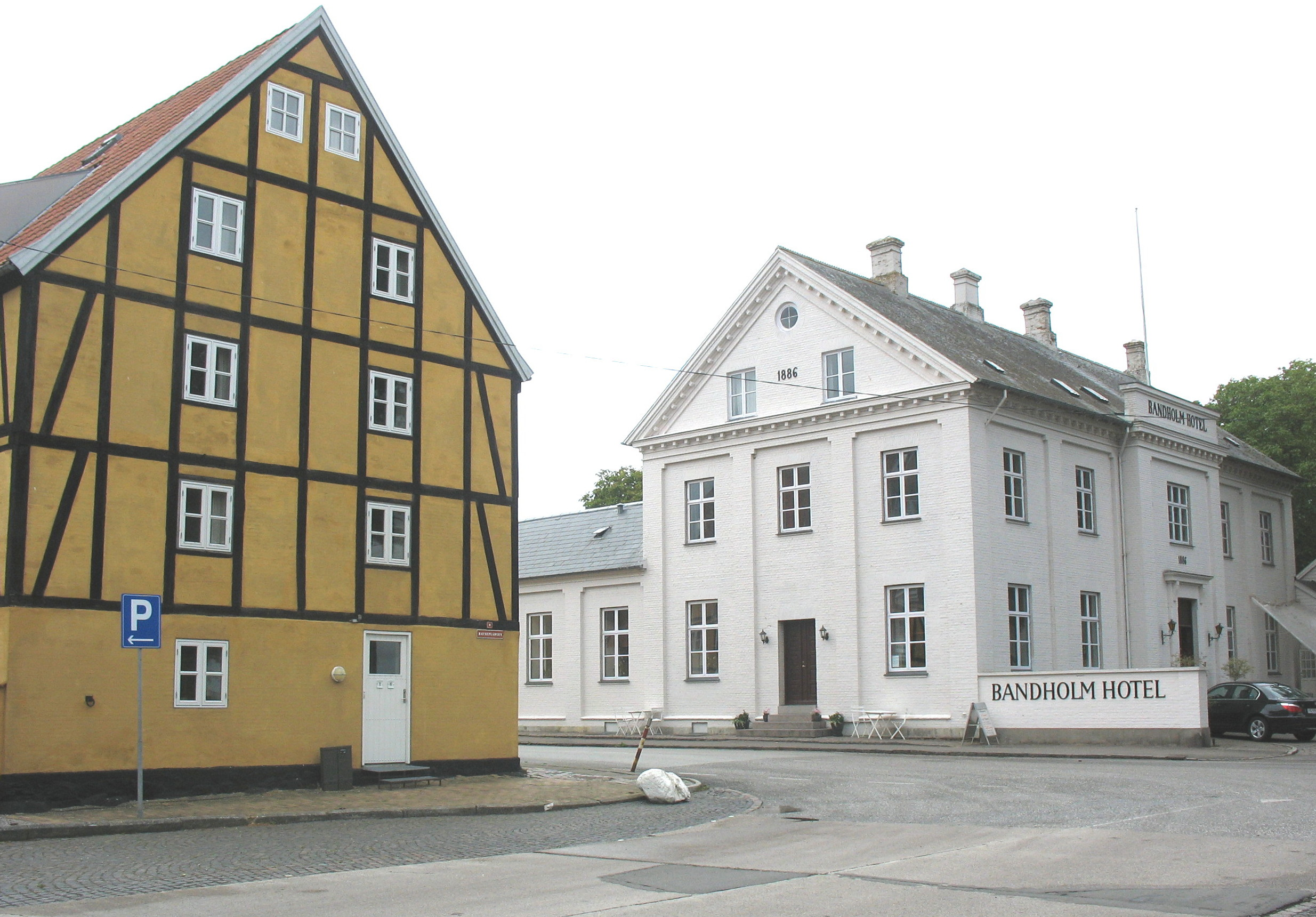
- Street in Bandholm town

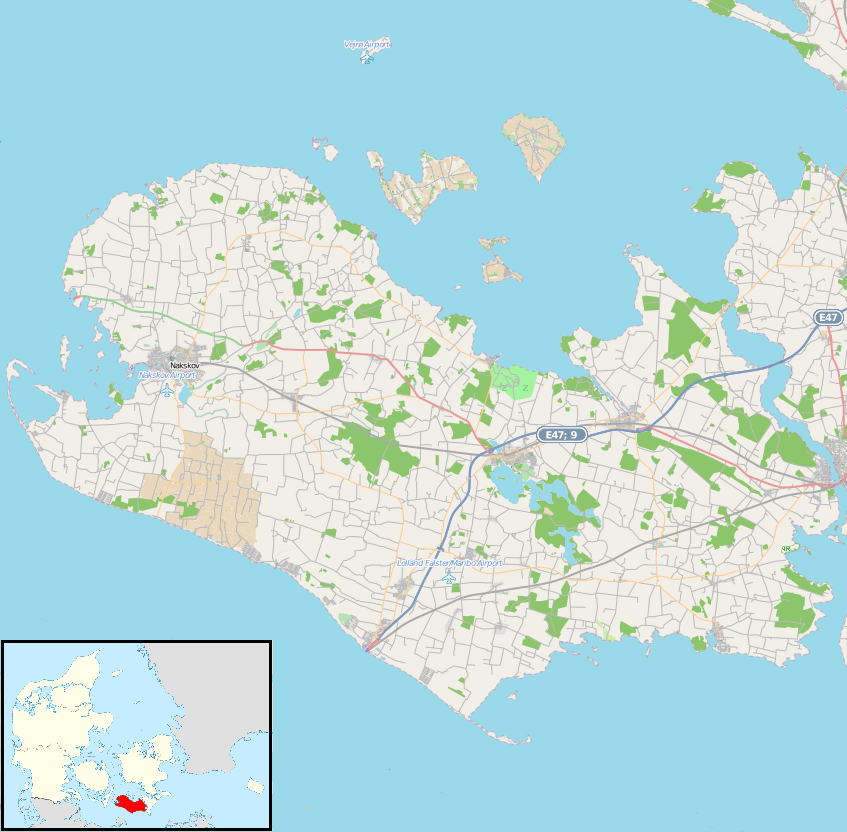
- Location in Lolland
- Coordinates: 54°50′14″N 11°28′59″E
- Country: Denmark
- Region: Zealand (Sjælland)
- Municipality: Lolland

Population (2026)
  - Total: 451
- Time zone: UTC+1 (CET)
  - Summer (DST): UTC+2 (CEST)

Bandholm is a small port town and parish on the coast of northern Lolland, Region Zealand, Denmark. On 1 January 2026 it had a population of 451, and is located to the northwest of Knuthenborg Safari Park and Maribo. From Bandholm there is ferry service to Askø and rail link to Maribo, 8 km (5.0 mi) north of Maribo. Stokkemarke is its west and Østofte Parish forms its southwest border. It is served by Bandholm Station. The Maribo-to-Bandholm rail branch is operated by the Museumsbanen Maribo-Bandholm as a preserved railway.

In the 1800s, Bandholm was known for a major cholera epidemic, where the fight was led by Peter Ludvig Panum in 1853.

== History ==
=== Early history ===
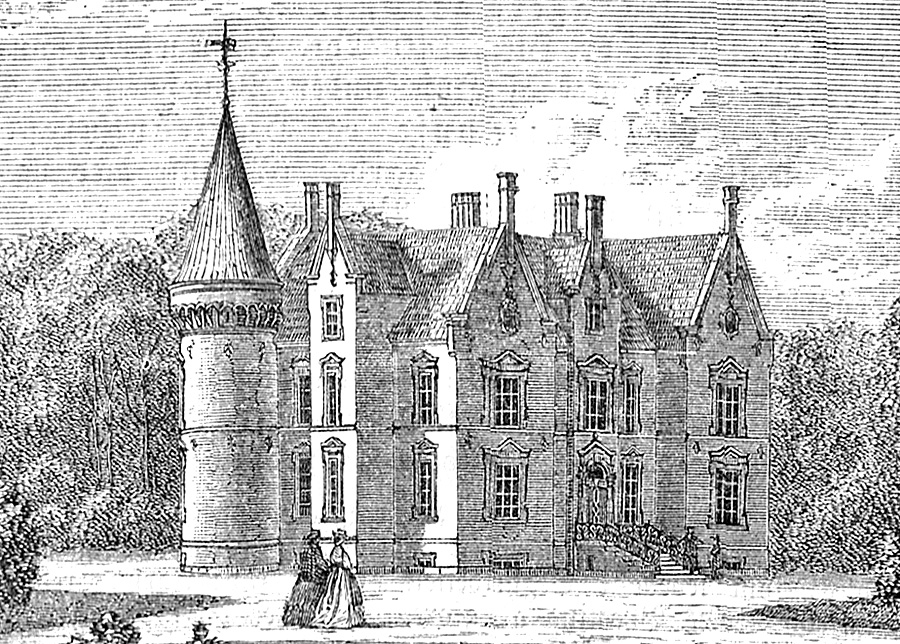
Knuthenborg castle

Bandholm has a history going back thousands of years as can be seen from the burial mounds from the Bronze Age in the immediate neighborhood. The port seems to have been used for centuries for ships with supplies for Maribo Abbey. The area then developed with warehouses and storage facilities for goods to be sent to Maribo and Rødby. At that time it was known as Bandholm Toldsted (Bandholm Customs Point).

=== 19th century ===
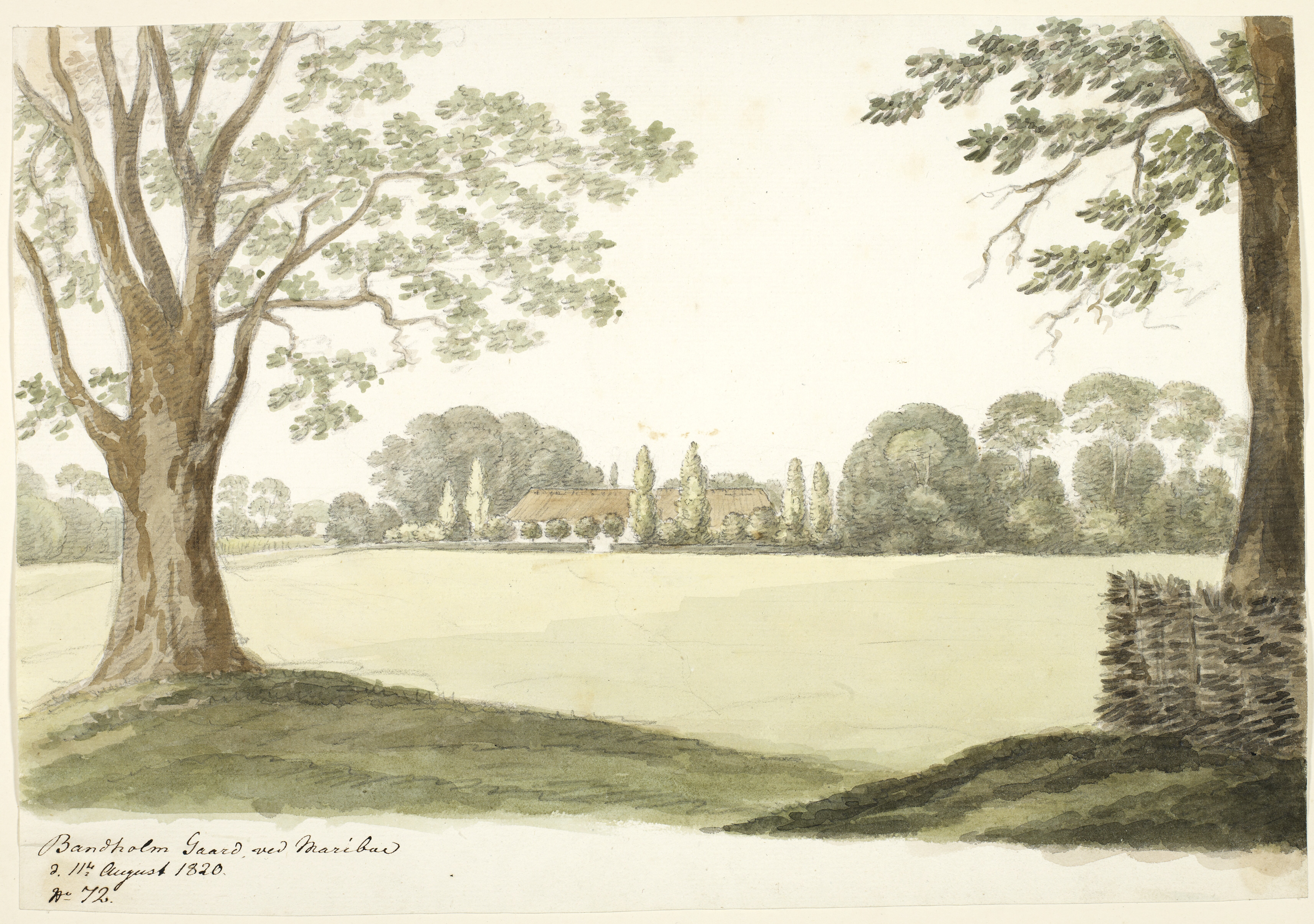
Bandholm Farm viewed on a watercolour by Ole Jørgen Rawert painted on 11 August 1820.

Initially, in view of the shallow depth of the inlet, goods had to be taken out to the sailing ships by barge but in 1834 a small jetty was built to facilitate mooring. In the early 1840s, the channel was deepened to 10 ft (3.0 m), allowing larger ships to enter the port which was soon equipped with quays. The facilities grew further with the arrival of steamships bringing corn and other foodstuffs to be transported to Maribo. The traffic intensified with the railway from Maribo to Bandholm in 1870.

The more recent history of Bandholm is linked to the Knuthenborg estate and the castle, which owned the port and also some of the houses (distinctive in their yellow exteriors) in the town and its extensive surroundings.

=== 20th century ===
In recent years the Knuthenborg Safari Park has made the port town a focal point of for over 200,000 tourists a year. The old port has been further improved with a state of the art marina for yachts as well as facilities on the west side of the harbor for use by boaters.

Bandholm has developed not only into a prosperous port but has also benefitted from the establishment of an iron foundry, hotels and a commercial life in connection with the railway. Local initiatives have ensured restoration of the heritage status of many of the old structures, especially the granaries (for other uses) and the old railway station.

== Port ==
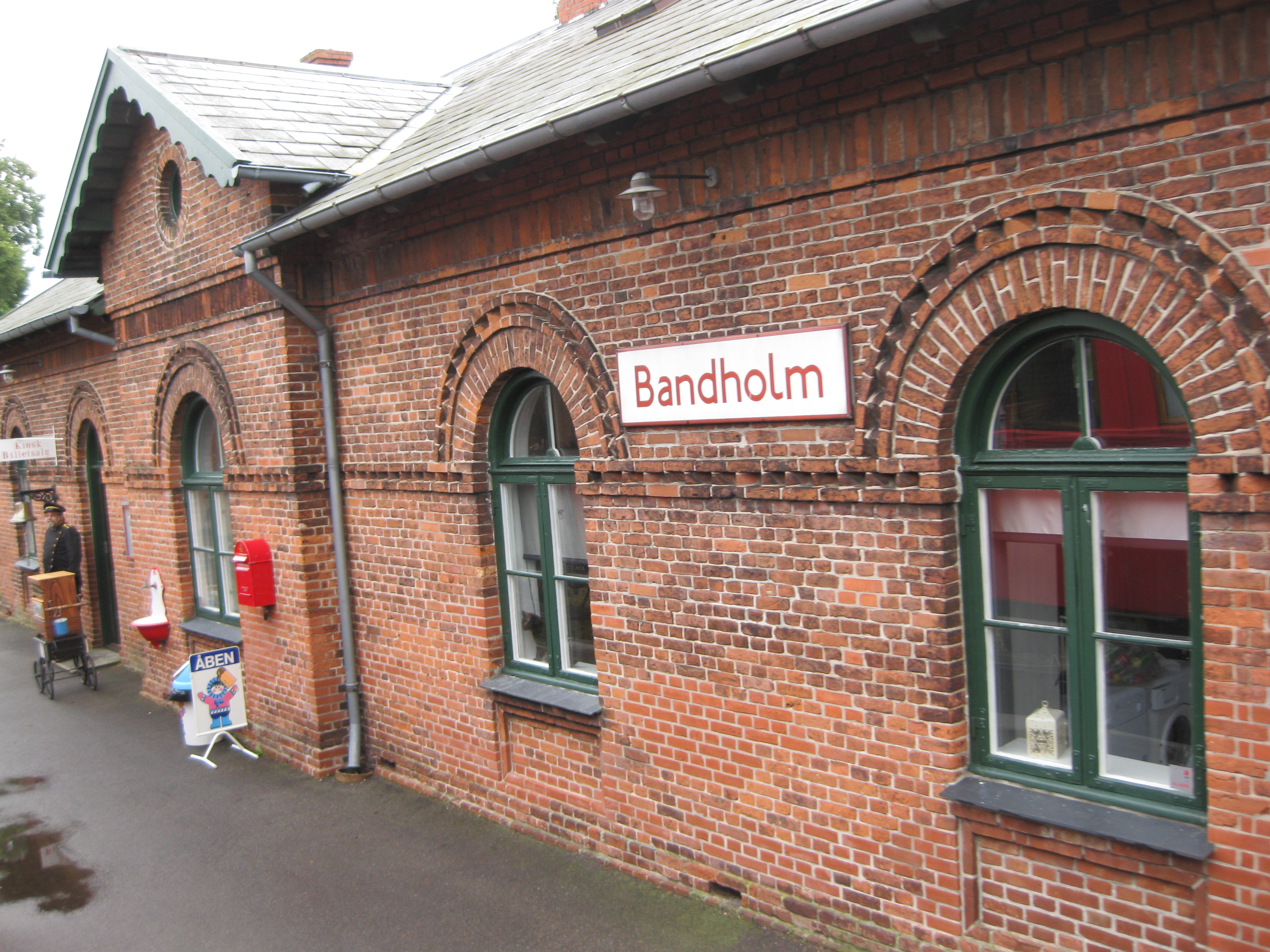
Bandholm Station in the town.

Initially, the channel leading to the port was dredged to allow vessels to pass through to a depth of 19 feet (5.8 m) over a width of 60 ft (18 m) with a widened stretch of 120 ft (37 m) for vessels to negotiate a turn. A pier was built with a length of 1,050 feet (320 m) and a width of 120 ft (37 m) at its head in order to facilitate quick and easy loading of grain; there were also two shorter piers for use by smaller vessels in a draft of 10 ft (3.0 m). The port served the town of Maribo which is located 4 miles (6 km) away with connections to Nakskov, Rødby, and Sakskøbing stations. It also had a repair facility and a building yard. Two beacons at the northeastern end of Lindhom provided the required guidance for the vessels through the approach channel to the port. For loading grain and coal, electric cranes and two grain elevators were fixed on the quay. Today, appropriate, navigational facilities are operated during the season with red lights, range lights at fixed heights, buoys, and a channel marked out with red spar buoys to facilitate navigation into and out of the harbor. The tidal fluctuation noted every 6 hours is of the order of 1 foot at the harbor. During gales it varies between 2 and 3 ft (0.6 and 0.9 m).

== Notable landmarks ==
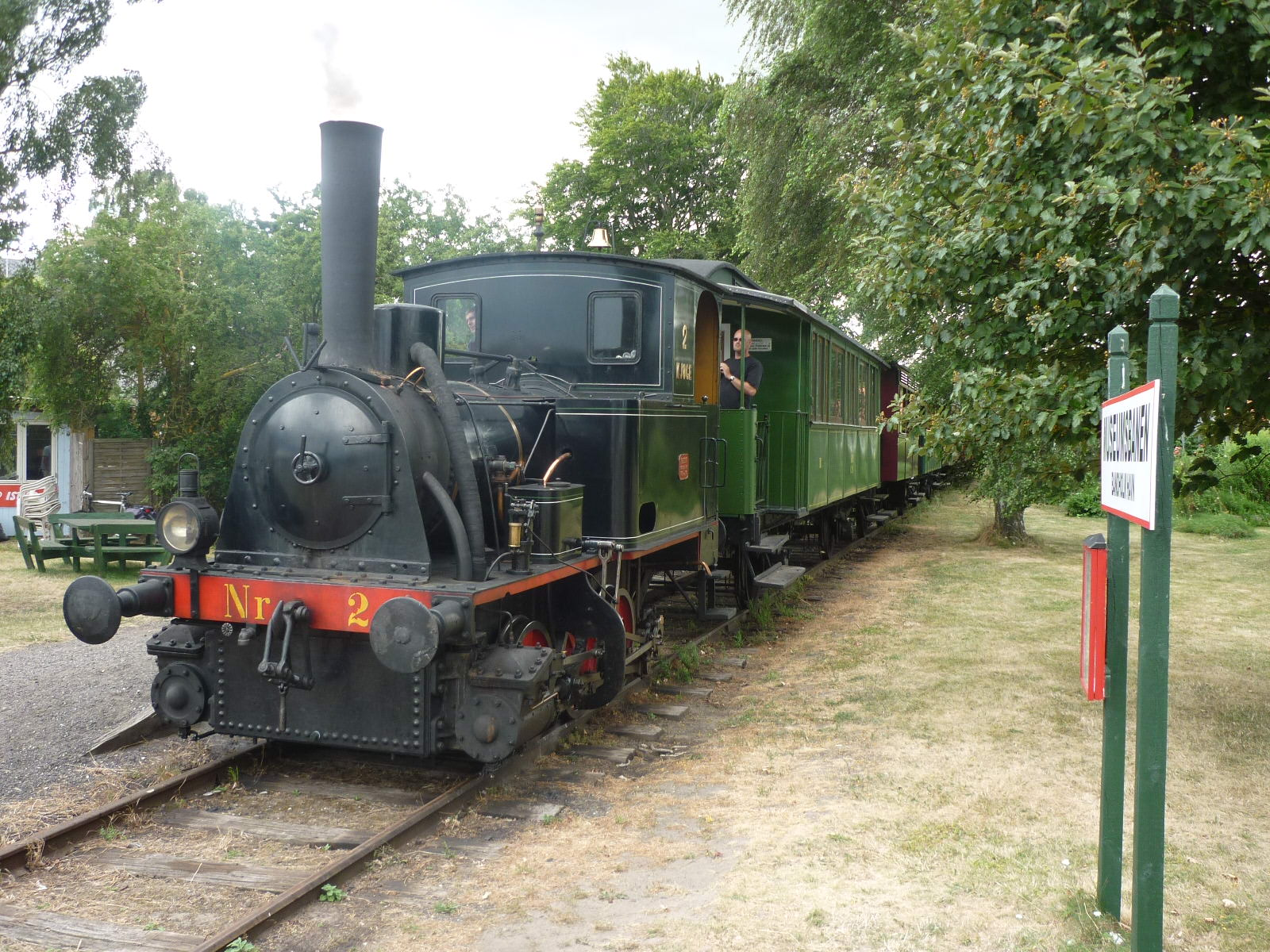
Heritage train Maribo-Bandholm: Steam locomotive KJØGE at Bandholm harbour

Bandholm Church designed by Henrik Steffens Sibbern was completed in 1874. Built of red brick in the Romanesque Revival style, it consists of a chancel, a nave and a tower with a conical spire.

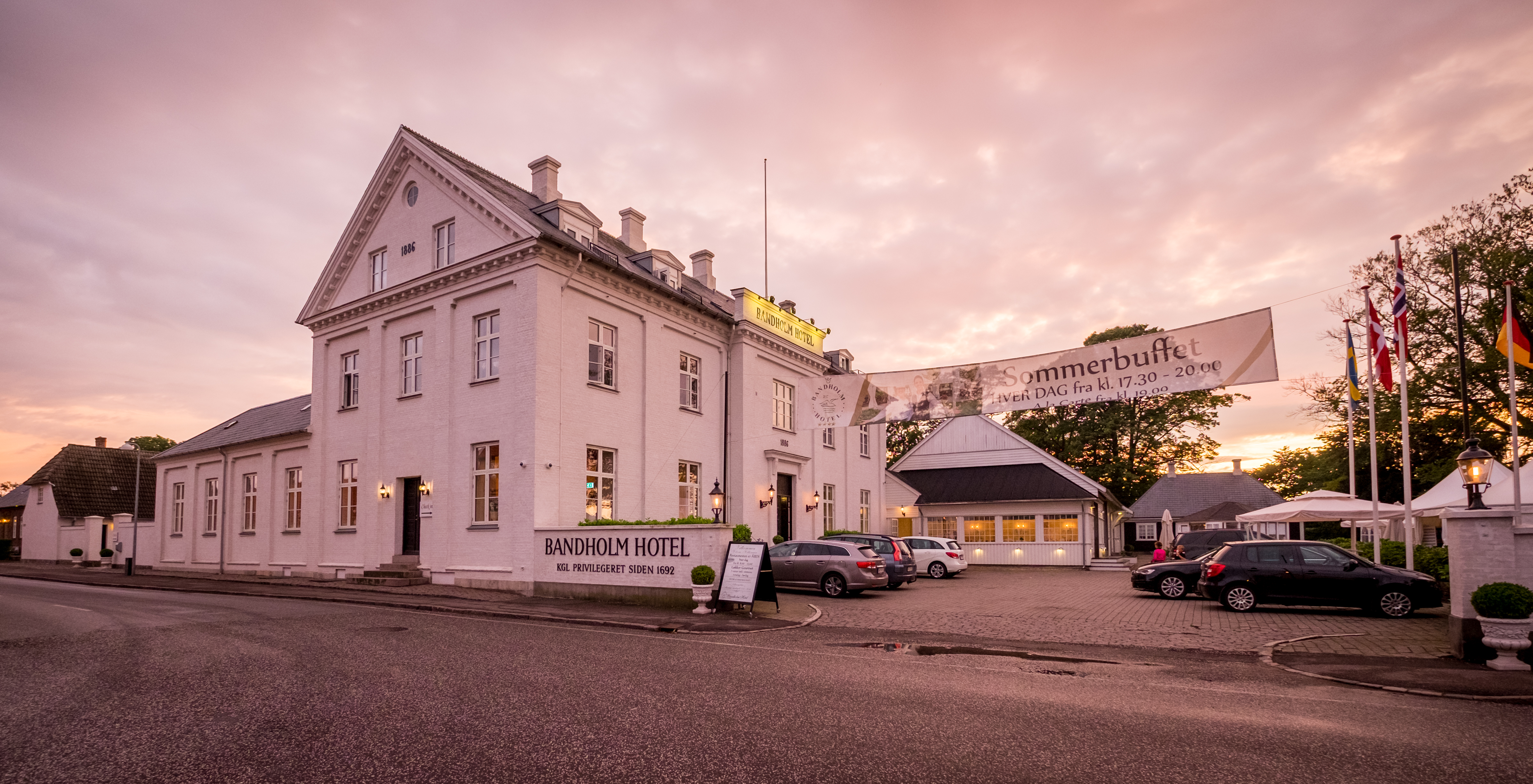
Bandholm Hotel

A prominent wheat silo, now converted into an exhibition centre, stands on the harbor's east side while a red church with a slender spire is located near the town's west end.

Built in 1886, the Bandholm Hotel is situated on the coast road near Knuthenborg Safari Park. The Maribo-Bandholm Museum was founded in 1962; it houses the oldest running steam locomotive in the country and the oldest private railway track (1869).

== Notable people ==
- Knud Olsen (1919 – 2010 in Bandholm) a Danish builder and designer of boats, who designed the OK Dinghy, one of the most popular sailing dinghies; he lived and worked in Bandholm from 1961
