= Knud Olsen =

Danish boat builder and designer

- Born: 1919; Præstø, Denmark
- Died: 31 August 2010 (aged 90–91); Bandholm, Denmark
- Occupations: Boat builder; yacht designer
- Years active: 1930s–1980s
- Known for: Design of the OK Dinghy; Bandholm sailboats

Knud Olsen (1919 in Præstø – 31 August 2010 in Bandholm) was a Danish builder and designer of boats, who designed one of the most popular sailing dinghies in use over the past 50 years, the OK Dinghy, which became an ISAF International Class in 1974.

Olsen went on to design sailboats built in the town of Bandholm under that name. The Bandholm boats were built between 20 and 35 feet long starting in 1961 and until the builders went under in the late 80s.

== Biography ==
Olsen was born in 1919 in Præstø, Denmark. In 1939, he and his brother, Bjørn, formed a boatbuilding business and designed and built several boats until a shortage of boatbuilding material caused by World War II ended the business. In the early 1950s, he joined the Danish company, A. P. Botved, who were producing speedboats, and worked there until he started his own business in Bandholm in 1961. He designed and built a number of boats including the Bandholm 26, the Bianca 27 and the Great Dane 28, which were the first Danish boats to be built using fibreglass hulls, the Bandholm 20, Bandholm 30, the Mariboat and the Bandholm 24.

In 1956, Danish architect, Axel Damgaard Olsen, asked Olsen to create a design for a light, fast, single-handed sailing dinghy that could be built and sailed by amateurs. The outcome was the 4.0-metre (13.1 ft) OK dinghy, which went on to be a classic design, became an ISAF International Class in 1974 and is still used in international competition. The 50th anniversary of the design of the OK dinghy was marked by the largest ever OK Dinghy World Championships held at Łeba on the Polish coast in July 2007.

Knud Olsen died aged 90 on 31 August 2010 in his hometown Bandholm.

== See also ==
- OK Dinghy

== Sources ==
- Okdia: Knud Olsen
- OK Dinghy World Championships, Leba, Poland
- Sailworld.com: Largest ever OK Dinghy World Championships
- Welcome to the OK coral, Dansk Okjolle Klub
