= Arninge Church =

Coordinates: 54°47′26″N 11°10′19″E

- Arninge Kirke
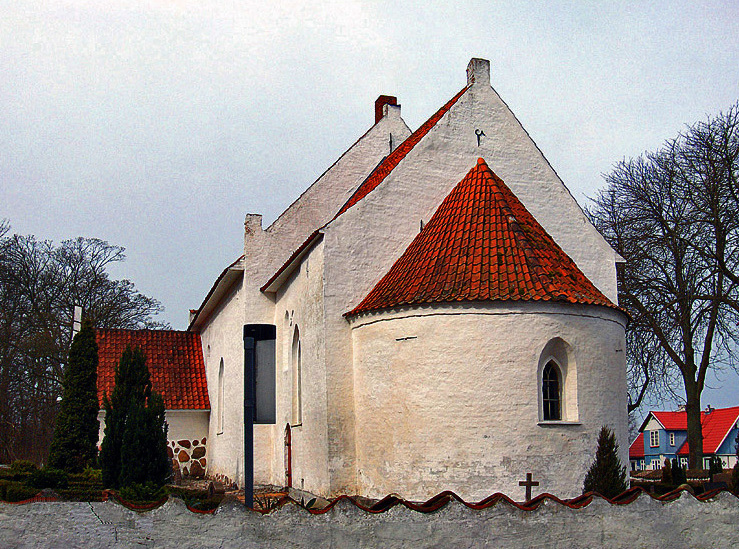
- Arninge Church
- Location: Arninge, Lolland
- Country: Denmark
- Denomination: Church of Denmark

History
- Earlier dedication: Mary, mother of Jesus

Architecture
- Architectural type: Romanesque architecture, Gothic architecture
- Completed: ca. 1250

Administration
- Diocese: Diocese of Lolland–Falster
- Deanery: Lolland Vestre Provsti
- Parish: Arninge Sogn

Arninge Church is a Late Romanesque church in the little village of Arninge, some 8 km (5.0 mi) south of Nakskov on the Danish island of Lolland. Built of red brick in the 13th century, it has an intricately carved auricular altarpiece created by Henrik Werner in 1644.

== History ==
The church was originally dedicated to the Virgin Mary.

== Architecture ==
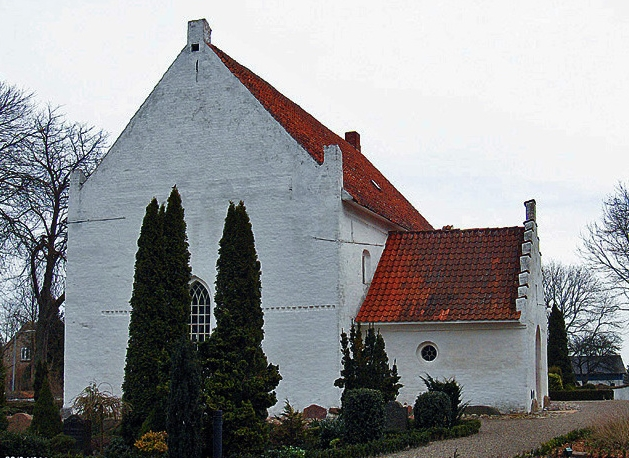
Arninge Church, Lolland

Built of red brick, the church consists of a Romanesque apse, chancel and nave and a Gothic porch. There is a free-standing 14th century timber bell tower adjacent to the church. The chancel has traces of a round-arched south door and of a round-arched window, now bricked up. There are also traces of two Romanesque windows in the south wall of the nave above the porch. The three cross-vaults in the nave are from the Late-Romanesque period.

== Interior ==
The altarpiece (1644) was carved in the auricular style by Henrik Werner who also created the altarpiece in Maribo Cathedral. Werner's workshop also produced the carved font (c. 1640). The crucifix on the chancel wall was found on the loft during restoration work in 1937. The figure of Christ is from c. 1300 although the cross itself is more recent. The Renaissance pulpit is from c. 1605.

== See also ==
- List of churches on Lolland
