= Fuglse Church =

Coordinates: 54°42′28″N 11°30′48″E

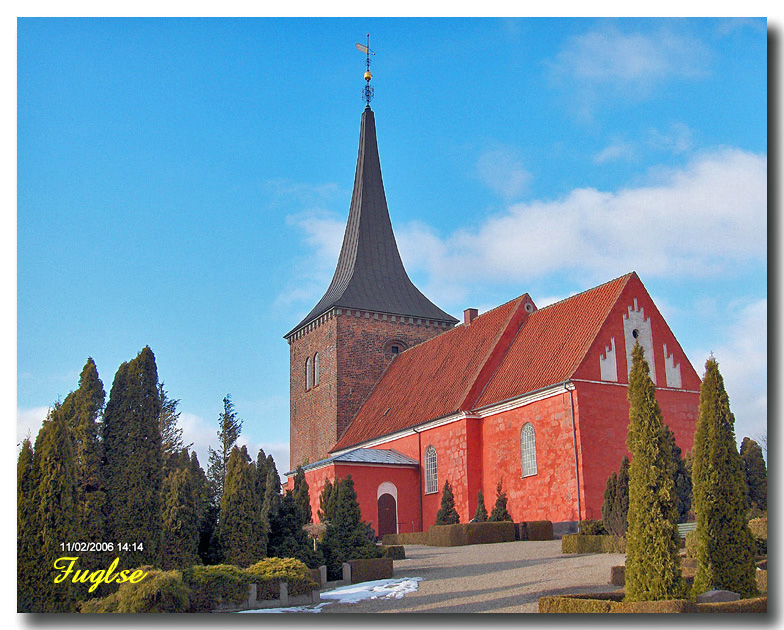
Fuglse Church, Lolland

Fuglse Church is a parish church located some 13 km (8.1 mi) south of Maribo on the Danish island of Lolland. The original Romanesque church was almost totally rebuilt in the Renaissance style in the late 16th century. Standing prominently on a hilltop, the red-plastered building has a tall spire roofed in shingles.

== History ==
The medieval church was originally dedicated to St Lawrence but after it was rebuilt in 1595 it was dedicated to the Holy Trinity. After the Reformation it was owned by the Crown until it was transferred to the prefect Henning Ulrich von Lützow in 1689 who gained ownership of nearby Søholt the following year. It later came into the ownership of Raben Huitfeld Levetzau til Kærstrup (1835) and then Baron Gottlob Rosenkrantz until it gained independence in 1916.

== Architecture ==
The old Romanesque church fell into such a bad state of repair that it was almost completely rebuilt by Henning Gøye til Kærstrup og Søholt in 1595. Now in the Renaissance style, the church consists of a chancel, nave and tower, with burial chapels to the north and south. Unusually, the north chapel is three-sided. More recently, a small porch was built on the west side of the tower. The chancel, nave and chapels are built of roughly-hued fieldstone with some brick while the tower is in red brick.

== Interior ==
The Renaissance triptych altarpiece (1610), partly reconstructed from an earlier five-winged Late-Gothic work, contains a copy of Jacob Jordaens' Adoration of the Shepherds from 1618. The pulpit (c. 1600) bears copies of Bertel Thorvaldsen's carved figures of Peter, Paul and John which were added later. There are epitaphs to Henning Ulrich von Lützow and his two wives at the entrance to the burial chapel on the north side of the nave. The rather primitive baptismal font from the Romanesque period is in granite.

== See also ==
- List of churches on Lolland
