= Olstrup Church =

Church building in Lolland Municipality, Denmark

Coordinates: 54°40′25″N 11°27′54″E

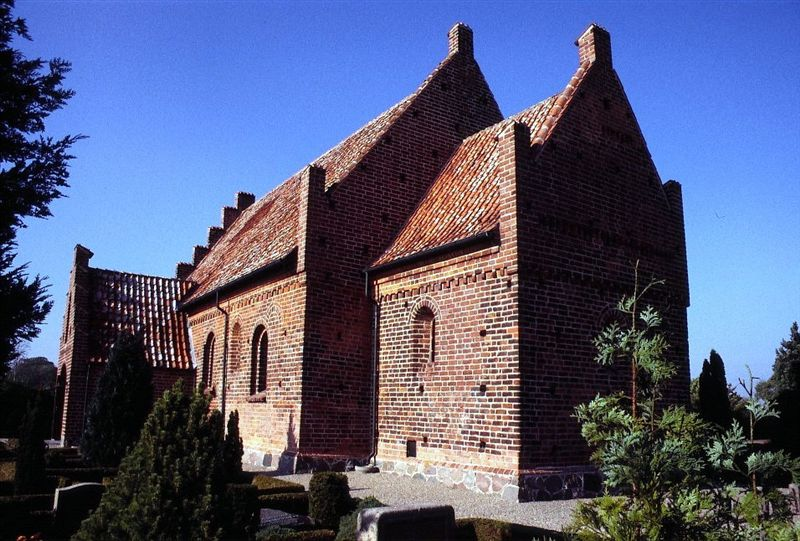
Olstrup Church, Lolland

Olstrup Church is a Romanesque church in open country west of Errindlev in the south of the Danish island of Lolland. There are 16th-century frescos of the Last Judgment on the chancel arch with Christ sitting on a rainbow.

== Architecture ==
In the Middle Ages, the church was originally dedicated to St Lawrence. Built of red brick, the relatively small church first consisted of a Romanesque chancel and nave. It was later extended to the west in the Late Gothic period with a stepped gable. The chancel's cross-vaults and the round chancel arch may date from the church's original construction. The cross-vaults in the nave also seem to be older than the Gothic extension.

== Frescos ==
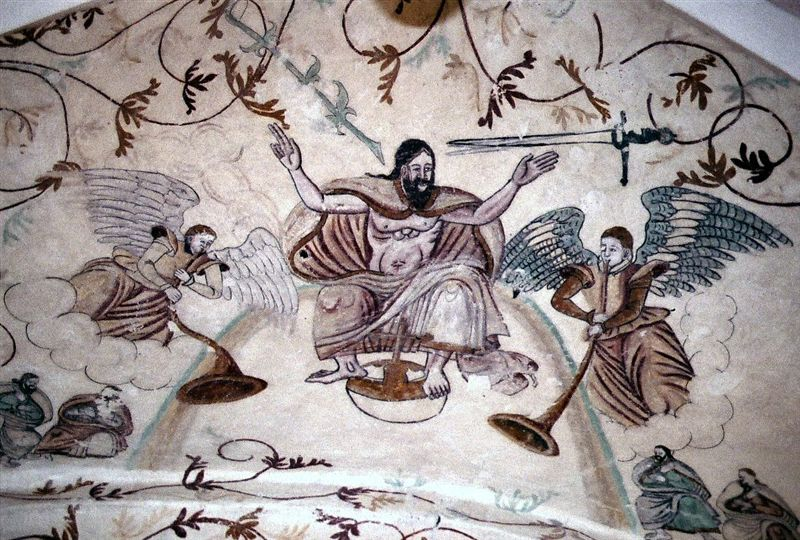
Fresco of Christ on a rainbow

In 1936, Egmont Lind discovered frescos in the east vault of the nave which were dated to c. 1575. They present scenes of the Last Judgment. Christ is depicted sitting on a rainbow with his feet on the globe of the Earth, flanked by trumpet-playing angels and the 12 apostles. Some pre-Reformation features such as the lily and sword are included but there are no halos.

== Interior ==
The carved pulpit from 1622 has figures of the apostles. The canopy is from c. 1675. On the north wall there is a figure of St Lawrence from c. 1300. There is a decorated font in Gotland limestone.

== See also ==
- List of churches on Lolland

== Literature ==
- Kirsten Weber-Andersen, Otto Norn, Aage Roussell, Gertrud Købke Knudsen, "Olstrup Kirke", Danmarks kirker: Maribo amt, Volume 8, 1951, Nationalmuseet, pages 703-714. (in Danish)
