= Big Joe (dinosaur) =

Allosaurus fossil

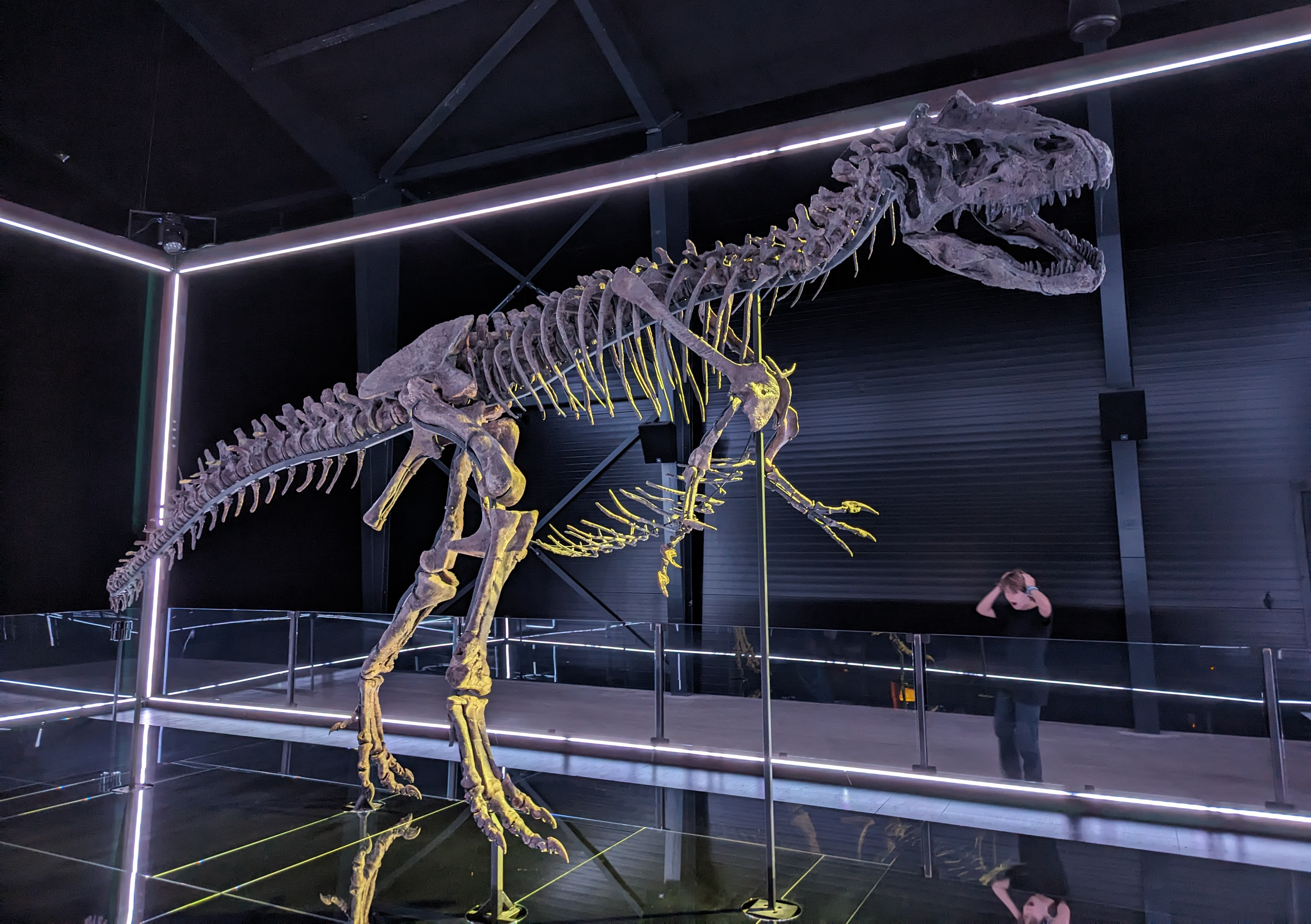
- Big Joe on display at Knuthenborg Safaripark
- Common name: Big Joe
- Species: Allosaurus jimmadseni
- Age: c. 155 million years (aged c. 30)
- Place discovered: Wyoming, United States
- Date discovered: 2015
- Discovered by: Brock Sisson

Big Joe is a well-preserved Allosaurus fossil. First assumed to be an individual of the species Allosaurus fragilis, it is now thought to belong to the newly described Allosaurus jimmadseni. The large theropod dinosaur lived around 155 million years ago in the Late Jurassic on a North American flood plain. Its powerful hind limbs, sharp claws and serrated teeth, made it an apex predator of its ecosystem. With 95% of its skeleton preserved and rare skin imprints, Big Joe is one of the best-preserved Allosaurus fossils found.

== Discovery ==
The fossil was discovered in 2015 by Brock Sisson and colleagues in the Wyoming in what was once the sandbank of a river. It took 10 men 18 months to finally free Big Joe from the sandstone he was encased in.

Skin impressions from the underside of the neck are preserved, with a pattern similar to that seen on the underside of snakes.

== Fossil characteristics ==
Big Joe is measured at 9 meters (30 feet) long and 2.2 metres (10 feet) tall, and weighed around 1.5 tons, which means that he is one of the largest Allosaurus known.

Big Joe is estimated to have died at around 30 years old, based on a count of growth rings (lines of arrested growth) present in a bone that was broken during fossil preparation. This discovery makes it one of the oldest Allosaurus to have been histologically sampled.

The skeleton itself contains a few injuries. First, the calf and shin are fused together with ankle bones, indicating recovery from an injury. This may have taken place due to a fight with another predatory dinosaur or a failed hunt. The extent of healing indicates Big Joe survived long after this injury occurred. In addition, there is an infection on the head and the teeth show signs of disease.

== Exhibition ==
As of February 2025, Big Joe is part of the Museum of Evolution inside the Knuthenborg Safaripark. The fossil is part of a newly built exhibition which opened to the public on 9 April 2023, after initially arriving with several other prehistoric fossils from the Permian like Dimetrodon. Visitors can see the fossil in the Dinosaur Era of the Museum together with other dinosaur fossils such as the world's biggest dinosaur skull belonging to the Torosaurus Adam.
