= Stokkemarke Church =

Coordinates: 54°50′05″N 11°21′43″E

- Stokkemarke Kirke
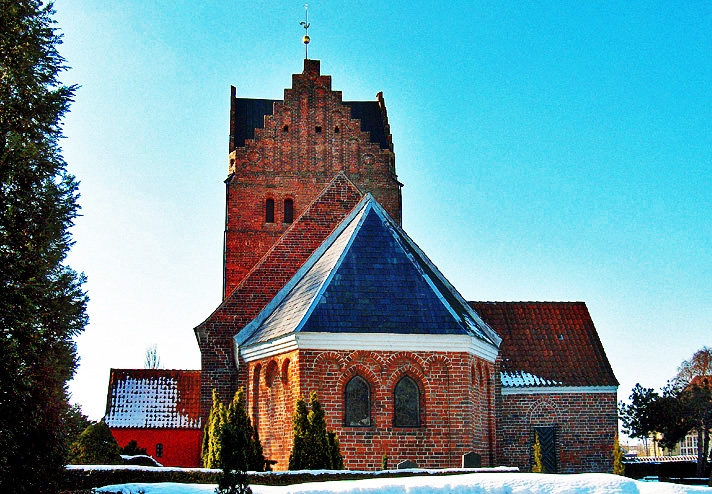
- Stokkemarke Church
- Location: Stokkemarke, Lolland
- Country: Denmark
- Denomination: Church of Denmark

Architecture
- Style: Romanesque architecture, Gothic architecture

Administration
- Diocese: Diocese of Lolland–Falster
- Parish: Stokkemarke Sogn

Stokkemarke Church is located in the village of Stokkemarke some 11 km (6.8 mi) northwest of Maribo on the Danish island of Lolland. Dating from the middle of the 13th century it was built in the Romanesque style with later additions in the Gothic period.

== History ==
The church was dedicated to St Clement in 1396 although it was later associated with St George, probably as a result of a panel from St Jørgens Hospital in Bregerup which hung in the church until 1878. A reliquary found in the high altar was a gift from Bishop Gisike of Odense (1286–1300), possibly a gift for the reconsecration of the altar on the completion of the apse which is just slightly older than the chancel. From the 14th century, the church was the property of the Crown but from the beginning of the 16th century, it was administered by Engelborg Manor on Nakskov Fjord. In 1687, it was transferred to the Bishop of Odense and later to Knuthenborg until it gained independence in 1912.

== Architecture ==
The church consists of a Late Romanesque chancel and nave and an apse, sacristy, porch and tower which were added during the Gothic period. It is built mainly of red brick with some fieldstone and with limestone trimmings. The chancel has corner lesenes and saw-tooth decorations. Both the north door and the former south door are now bricked up but traces of the original round Romanesque arches can still be seen. The tower is unusually large and almost as wide as the nave. The tower room has a pointed arch and a star-shaped vault. There is a small spire with a copper dome.

== Interior ==
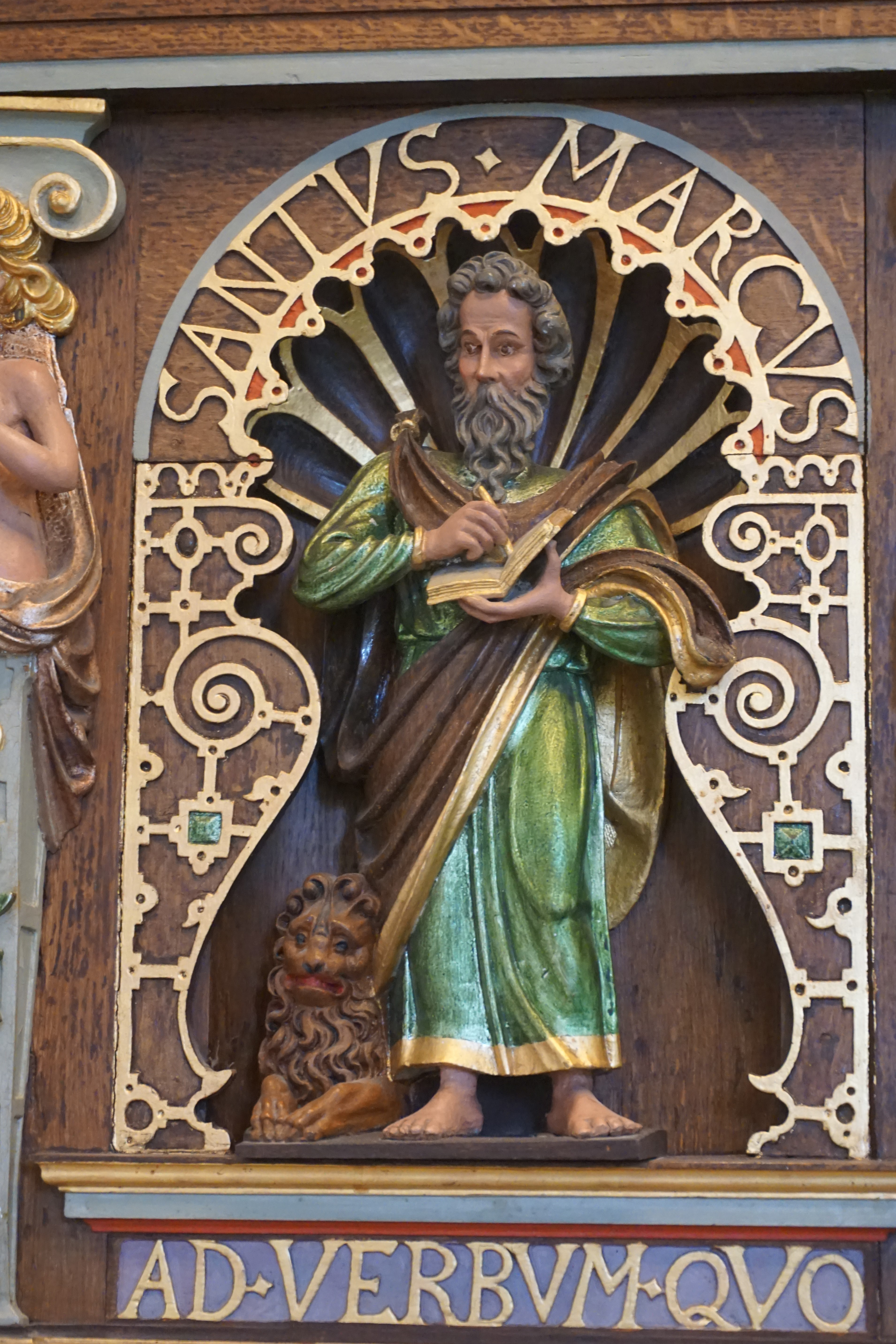
Detail of the pulpit

The chancel has a pointed arch and a vaulted Gothic ceiling in six segments. The original Romanesque windows in the nave were first converted into large Gothic windows with pointed arches before being replaced by today's smaller more modern windows which probably date from 1815. The cross on the altar dates from the end of the 15th century and was originally on the chancel arch. The Renaissance pulpit has four shell-shaped niches with figures of the Evangelists flanked by pilasters and covered with pointed arches.

== See also ==
- List of churches on Lolland
