= Østofte Church =

Church building in Lolland Municipality, Denmark

Coordinates: 54°48′5″N 11°25′32″E

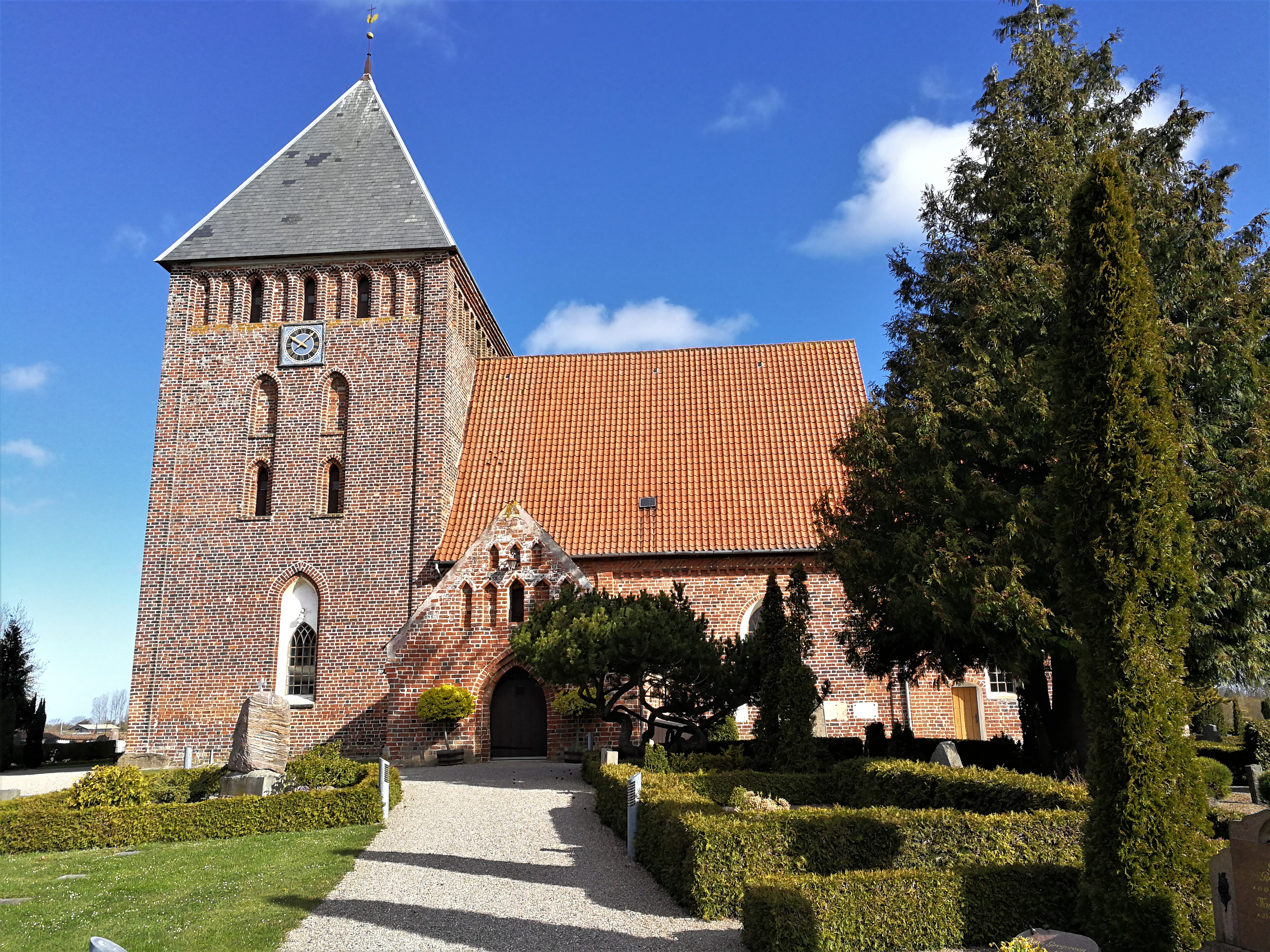
Østofte Kirke, Nørreballe

Østofte Church, located in the village of Nørreballe on the Danish island of Lolland, was built in the 14th century. The Romanesque apse, chancel and nave formed the original building while the tower and porch were added in the Late-Gothic period and the north wing was completed in 1656.

== History ==
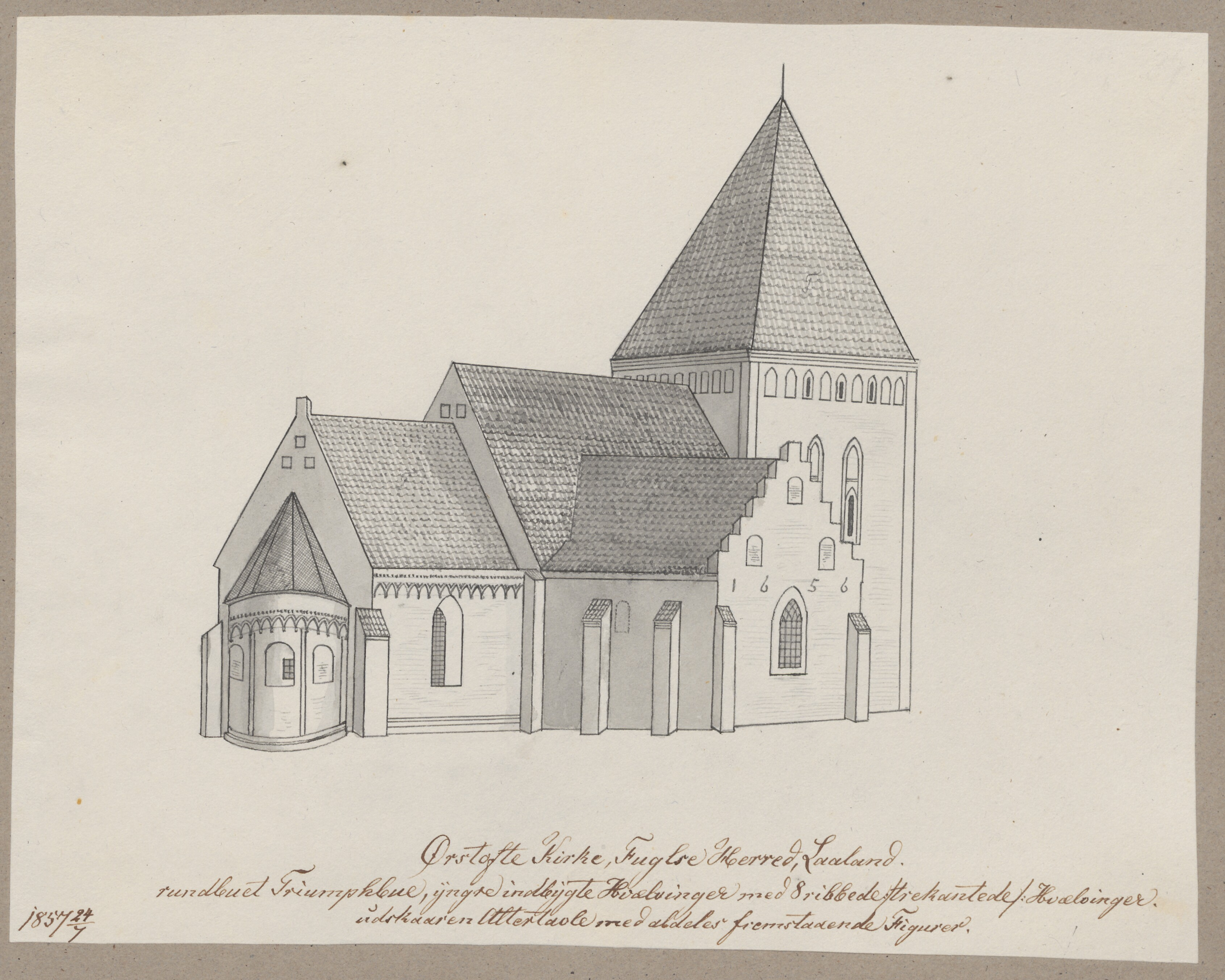
Østofte Church by Johann Gottfried Burman Becker, 1857..

The church was dedicated to St Peter, probably in 1345. King Christopher of Bavaria transferred ownership to Maribo Abbey as first documented in 1451. That ownership remained after the Reformation when Maribo became a convent for women. After a period of ownership by Christian IV's Sorø Academy until its closure in 1665, the church came under the Crown until 1687. It was then transferred to Eggert Christopher von Knuth (1643-1697). As a result, it came under the County of Knuthenborg on its formation in 1714 where it remained until it became independent in 1911. In 1881, Bandholm Parish was separated from Østofte after a new church was built in Bandholm.

== Architecture ==
The apse, chancel and nave of this red-brick church were built in the Romanesque period, while the tower with its pyramidal spire and the porch were added at the beginning of the 15th century in the Gothic style. The north wing was completed in 1656. The Romanesque sections are decorated with corner lesenes and are topped with saw-tooth friezes. The round-arched windows have either been enlarged or bricked in. Thin vertical blank windows decorate the top of the tower.

== Interior and fittings ==
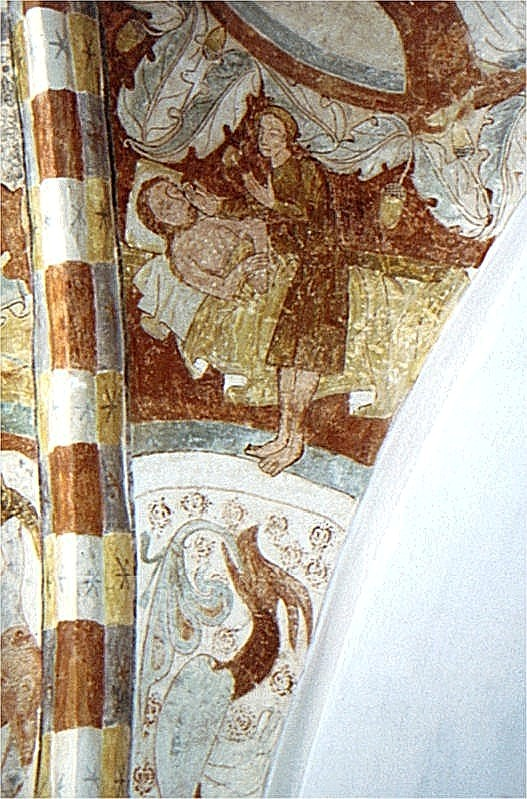
Fresco of Seth at Adam's deathbed

In the 14th century, star-shaped vaults were completed in the chancel and nave while the apse retained its half dome. The altarpiece, dated 1674, is rather unsophisticated baroque although the scenes in the central panel of the Last Supper and the Resurrection are somewhat earlier. The pulpit in the auricular style (c. 1650) presents cartouches of Faith, Hope and Charity.

Investigations in 1908 revealed frescos in the chancel and apsis from two periods, c. 1300 and c. 1400. The latter are mostly well preserved with scenes from the Creation including images of Adam and Eve, the Judgment of Christ as well as several dragons.

== See also ==
- List of churches on Lolland

== Literature ==
- Lassen, Thomas W. (2011). Østofte Kirke: sogn og kirke gennem århundreder (in Danish). Østofte Menighedsråd. ISBN 978-87-994654-0-8.
