= OK (dinghy) =

International racing sailing class

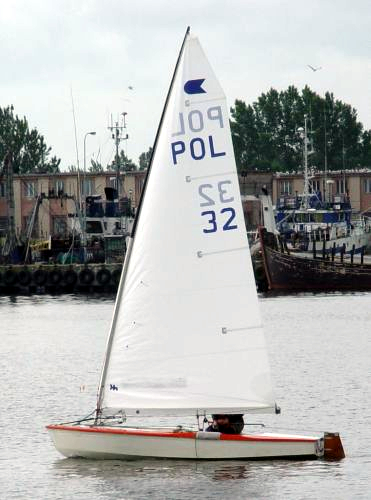

Development
- Designer: Knud Olsen

Boat
- Crew: 1
- Draft: 0.91 m (3 ft 0 in)

Hull
- Construction: plywood, fiberglass
- Hull weight: 72 kg (159 lb)
- LOA: 4.00 m (13 ft 1 in)
- Beam: 1.42 m (4 ft 8 in)

Sails
- Mainsail area: 8.95 m^{2} (96.3 sq ft)

Racing
- D-PN: 96.5
- RYA PN: 1100

The OK Dinghy is an international class sailing dinghy, designed by Knud Olsen in 1956.

== History ==
In 1956 Axel Damgaard Olsen of Vordingborg, asked the Danish yacht designer Knud Olsen to prepare drawings for a light and fast single-handed sailing dinghy based on conventional plywood construction. The resulting design was named the "OK", using Knud Olsen's initials in reverse.

The OK was intended as a preparation class for the Olympic Finn and it has followed its technical evolution ever since. The rig is identical to a Finn comprising a single sail set on a rotating, un-stayed, bending mast.

OKs are built in plywood, G.R.P and composite construction; all forms enjoy equal racing success. Freedom of choice in hull materials is replicated in choice of rig. The choice of mast, sail and fittings must fit within the class rules but enables all sailors to have a combination suited to their own requirements. Consequently, every OK develops to suit the owner's style of sailing, while the shape of the hull is defined by a comprehensive set of strict one-design rules ensuring a long competitive life span. Old boats often only need a rig update and minor constructional modifications to make them competitive, provided they meet modern buoyancy requirements.

In the 60s and 70s, the OK class enjoyed an explosive success, with the total number of boats exceeding 10,000, and large racing fleets building up. In the 80s, the success of the popular one-design single-handed Laser affected the success of the OK.

In the eastern European countries, the OK was the official youth single hander and after the breakdown of the USSR, many 'old' sailors came back to the class of their youth, now with their own boats instead of club-owned.

The OK Dinghy was selected as the Open class single hander for the Asian Games 1998.

In 2003 carbon fibre masts were introduced to the class.

In 2005, there was a revival of the OK class with many older boats being restored and updated, new boats being built and participation in club races rising.

The 50th anniversary of the design of the OK dinghy was marked by the largest ever OK Dinghy World Championships held at Łeba on the Polish coast in July 2007.

== See also ==
Knud Olsen
