= Knuthenborg Safaripark =

Safari park in Denmark

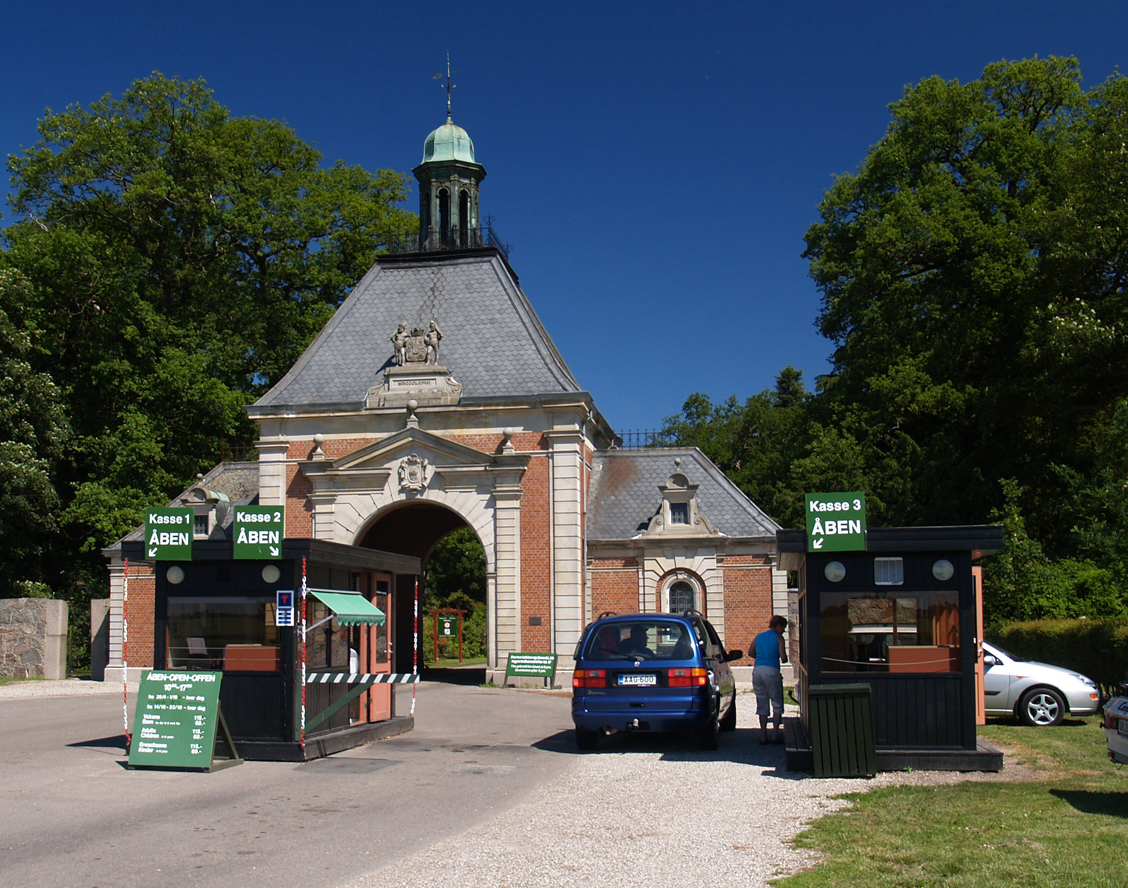
- Knuthenborg Safaripark entrance
- Interactive map of Knuthenborg Safaripark
- 54°49′25″N 11°30′21″E
- Date opened: 1950 (deer park); 1969 (exotic animals)
- Location: near Bandholm, Lolland, Denmark
- Land area: 660 hectares (1,600 acres)
- No. of animals: 1000
- No. of species: 40+
- Annual visitors: 310,000 (2019)
- Memberships: EAZA, WAZA
- Website: knuthenborg.dk/en/

Knuthenborg Safaripark is a safari park on the island of Lolland in the southeast of Denmark. It is located 5 km (3.1 mi) to the north of Maribo, near Bandholm. It is one of Lolland's major tourist attractions with over 300,000 visitors annually, and is the largest safari park in northern Europe. Among others, it houses a drive-through safari park, a monkey forest, large enclosures for Siberian tigers and African bush elephants, the Dinosaur Forest with full-scale models, the Museum of Evolution with fossils of dinosaurs and other prehistoric animals, an arboretum, and the largest nature playground in Denmark. Knuthenborg covers a total of 660 hectares (1,600 acres), including the 400-hectare (990-acre) Safaripark. The park is viewable on Google Street View.

== History ==
The park is set in Knuthenborg, previously known as the medieval manor of Årsmarke, which was Denmark's largest private estate. In 1714, it became part of the new county of Knuthenborg. The park has its origins in 1867 when Eggert Christoffer Knuth (1838-1874) built a sturdy 7.4 km (4.6 mi) wall around his property with stones fished out of the Smålandsfarvandet. He then hired English landscape architect Edward Milner who, on the basis of plans completed in 1870, laid out a park for his world collection of rare botanical plants as well as the many rhododendrons which are also a great attraction to tourists. There are several hundred species of exotic shrubs and trees. In 1926, the park became protected under a preservation order. An enclosed zoological garden was established in 1950 adjacent to Swan Lake (Svanesøen) with 70 deer. In 1969, Count Adam W. Knuth added the first exotic animals to the park; antelopes, plains zebras and ostriches were the first to be acquired from Kenya followed by white rhinos.

== Attractions ==
=== Safari park ===
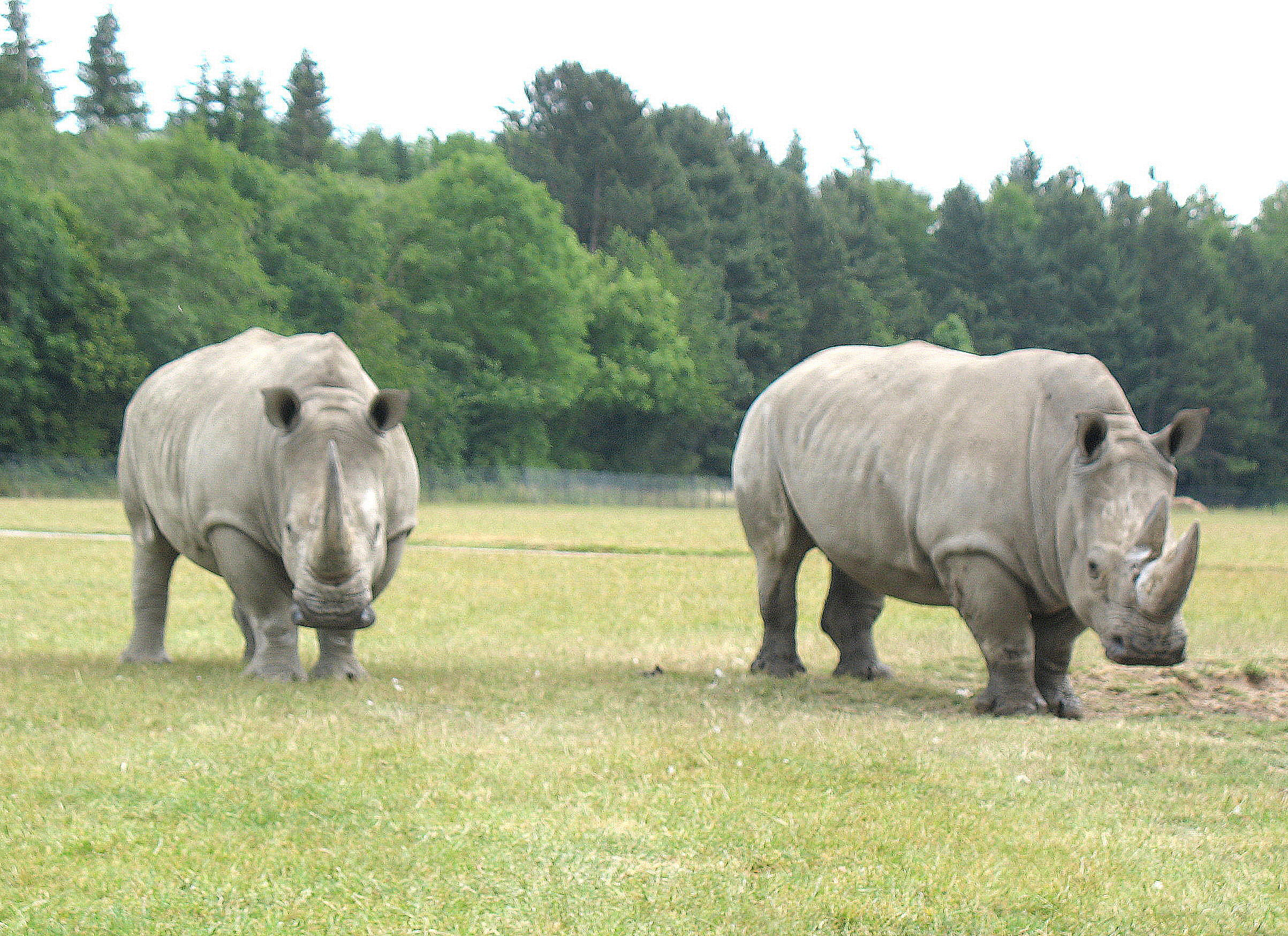
White rhinoceroses at the Knuthenborg Safaripark

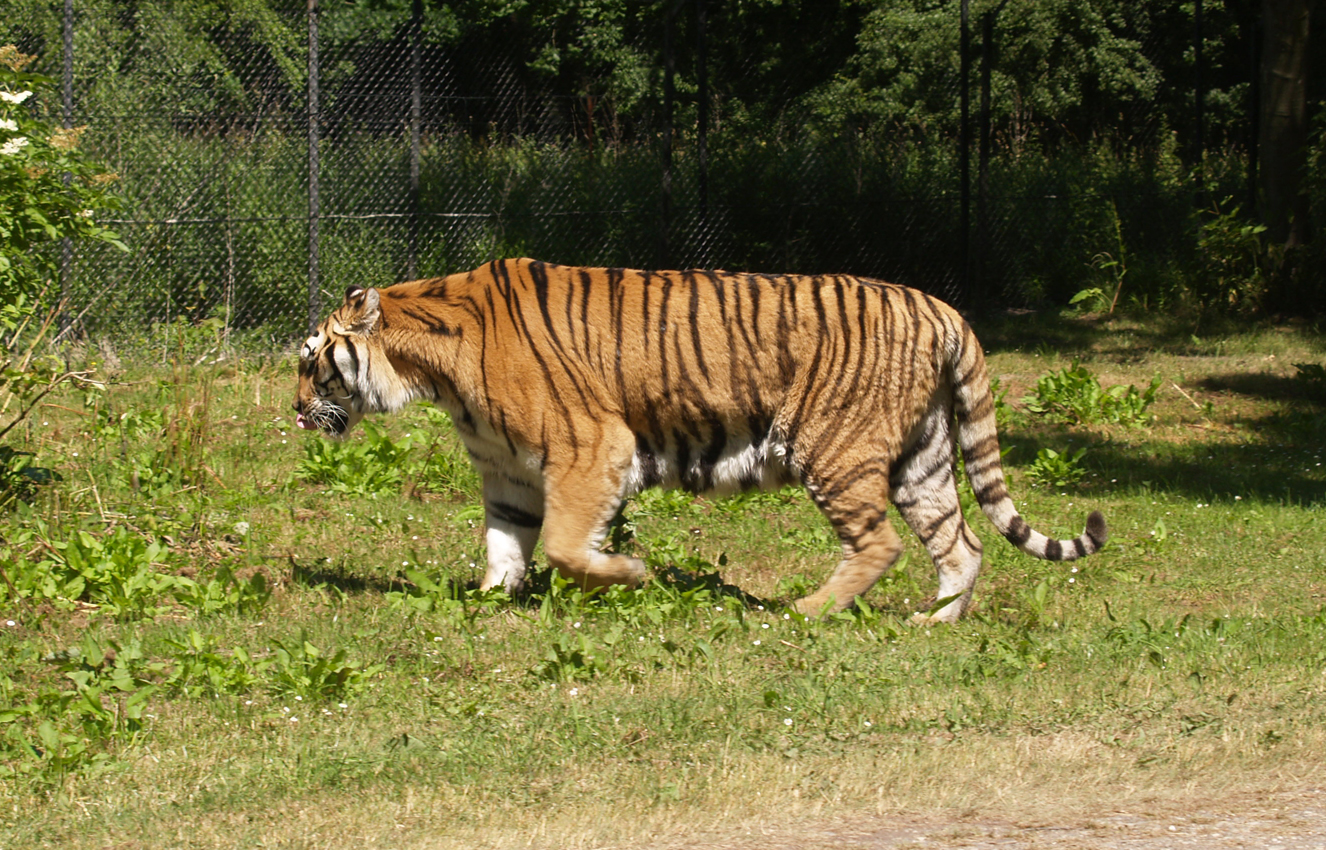
Siberian tiger in Knuthenborg Safaripark

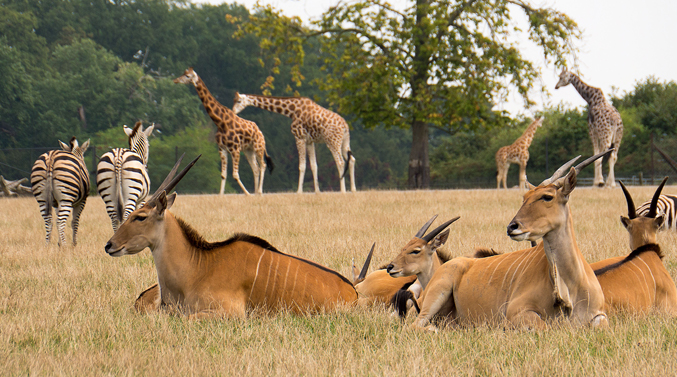
Elands, zebras and giraffes at the Knuthenborg Safaripark

Over the past 40 years, the number of animals in the park has grown to about a thousand of more than forty species, with a primary focus on mammals. Bactrian camels, antelopes, Rothschild's giraffes, yaks, black and white rhinoceroses, Chapman's zebras, wildebeests, moose, American bison and ostriches are some of the animals on view in the safari sections of Knuthenborg. The park also includes enclosures for African bush elephants (the largest elephant enclosure in northern Europe) and tigers (the largest enclosure for the species in Europe), walk-through enclosures with lemurs and red-necked wallabies, and an arboretum. In recent years, a number of animals from places no longer able to house them have been moved to the Safaripark, including African bush elephants in 2019 (after wild animals were banned from circuses in Denmark) and lions in 2022 (moved from a Ukrainian zoo due to the war with Russia). Prior to this, neither species was kept at Knuthenborg. In the areas with domestic animals such as West African dwarf goats, visitors can touch the animals if they allow it.

=== Dinosaur Forest and Museum of Evolution ===
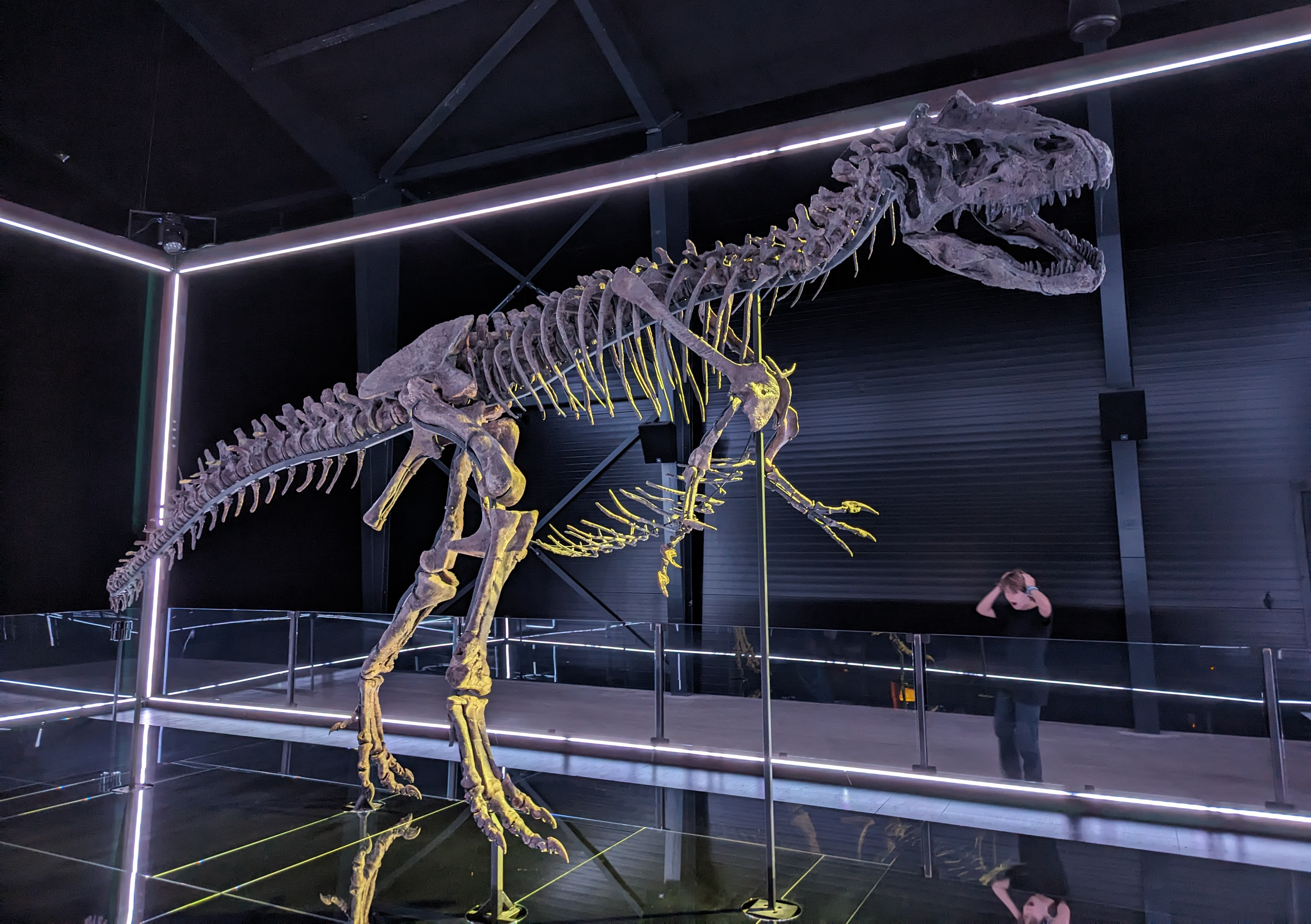
Skeleton of the Allosaurus "Big Joe" in the Museum of Evolution

In addition to living animals, Knuthenborg Safaripark is home to the Dinosaur Forest (Dinosaurskoven) with a large number of full-scale models of dinosaurs and pterosaurs. It opened in 2018 and some of the models are animatronic.

The Museum of Evolution (Evolutionsmuseet), opened in 2023, houses fossils of prehistoric animals, such as one of the largest (9 m [30 ft] long) and most complete (more than 95% preserved) Allosaurus skeletons named "Big Joe", a Torosaurus named "Adam" with the largest known dinosaur skull, the holotype specimen of Lokiceratops, dinosaur eggs, Dimetrodon and several other Permian animals, the giant ground sloth Eremotherium and one of only twelve known specimens of Archaeopteryx.

=== Amusement park ===
An amusement park section houses Denmark's largest nature playground, a water playground, trampolines, a family roller coaster (height requirement minimum 1 m [3 ft 3 in]) and a water coaster (height requirement minimum 1.2 m [3 ft 11 in]).

== Visitors ==
In 2012, there were some 223,000 visitors to Knuthenborg Safaripark representing a 10% increase over the previous year. The increase has been ascribed to new attractions and facilities for children. In 2019, there were 310,000 visitors, making it the 29th most visited tourist attraction in Denmark.

The safari park, dinosaur forest, Museum of Evolution and amusement park are all covered by a single entry ticket (cannot be visited separately). The park is open to visitors every day during the spring, summer and fall, but closed in winter. Although some distances can be large (the full road system inside the park is 23 km [14 mi] long), much of the Safaripark is bicycle or walk-friendly, but the African savannah, and sections housing moose, American bison and Arctic wolf are accessible only by those in a closed motor vehicle (own car or a bus); however parts of the African savannah are also viewable from outside the enclosure. Holiday houses and luxury tents overlooking some of the animal enclosures allow visitors to stay overnight.
