= Stokkemarke =

- Town
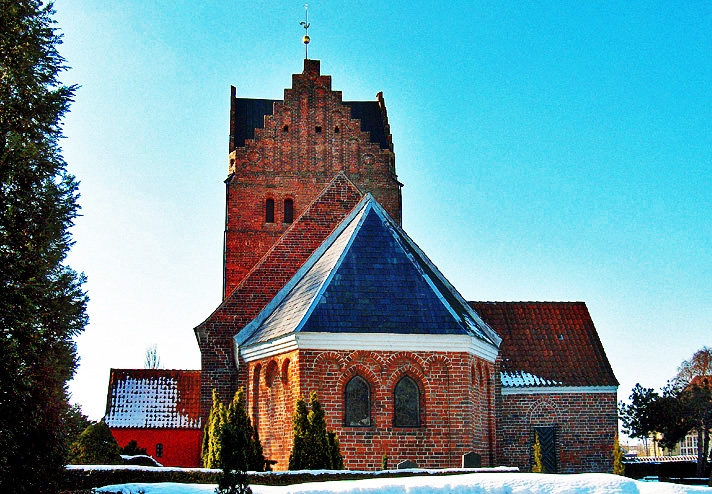
- Stokkemarke Church

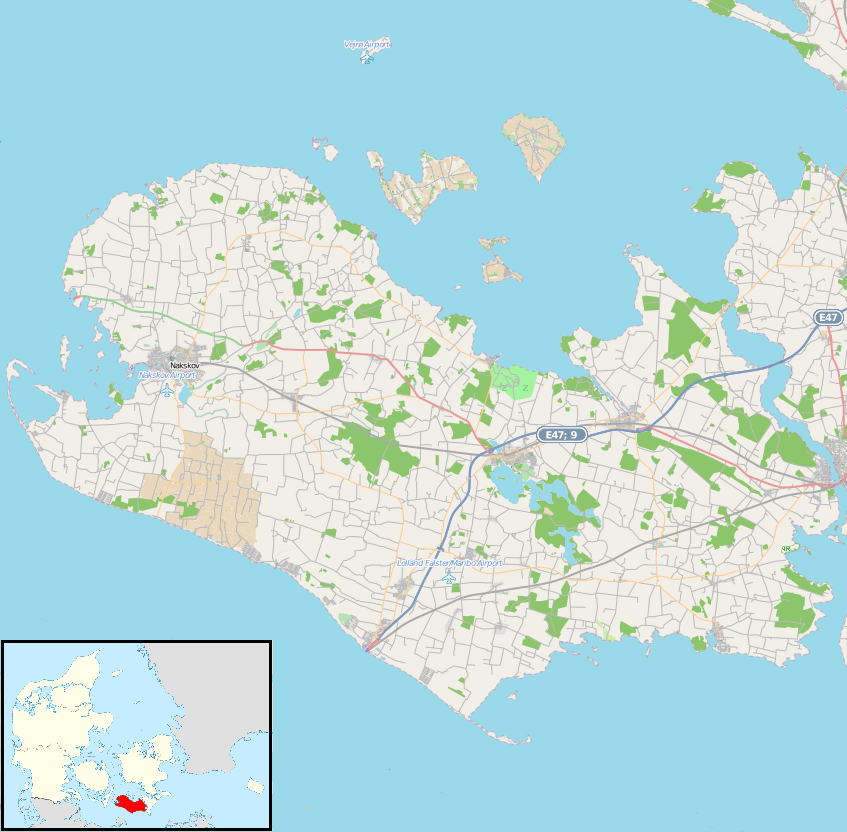
- Location on Lolland
- Coordinates: 54°50′14″N 11°21′47″E
- Country: Denmark
- Region: Zealand (Sjælland)
- Municipality: Lolland Municipality
- Parish: Stokkemarke

Population (2026)
  - Total: 400
- Time zone: UTC+1 (CET)
  - Summer (DST): UTC+2 (CEST)

Stokkemarke is a village on the Danish island of Lolland located midway between Nakskov and Maribo. In January 2026 it had a population of 400. Stokkemarke Church, first documented in 1396, originally built in the Romanesque style, has Gothic additions.

== History ==
Stokkemarke is known to have existed under Valdemar II in the 13th century. It is one of the few villages in the area which came directly under the Crown rather than being dependent on an estate. Its inhabitants were proud of their status as "free farmers". The village was an important halt for travelers with its inn, first documented in 1666.

The village is first mentioned in the Danish Census Book (1231) as Stockæmarc. It was originally part of the village of Bregerup (then Brikathorp) which in the Middle Ages had a hospital for lepers known as "St. Jørgens Hospital", first mentioned in 1389. When Bregerup was demolished, Count Adam Christopher Knuth established Knuthenlund in 1729, a driving force for the Stokkemarke community. It was once an independent municipality but was absorbed into Maribo Municipality following the local government reform in 1970. Since the 2007 reform it has come under Lolland Municipality.

The rural community expanded in the 20th century thanks to the establishment of several machinery works, especially Poul Rees a/s, bringing prosperity to the village and providing employment. The village also had its own dairy, a soap factory and a juice facility for the Maribo Sugar Factory.

== Notable people ==
- Emil Rostrup (1831 in Stokkemarke – 1907) a Danish botanist, mycologist and plant pathologist
- Sigurd Ømann (1923 in Stokkemarke – 1988) politician, chairman of the Socialist People's Party of Denmark in the period 1968–1974

== The village today ==
Stokkemarke, an important trading center, combines shops and factories with residential housing, often built to high standards of architecture and technology. The centrally located church is dated to the mid-13th century with a fine 16th-century tower. Opposite the church, the former library now serves as a cultural center and a youth club. In addition to a food store, a flower shop and a bakery, the village has an antique dealer and a bank. There are currently plans for renovating the centre of the village while improving its institutions and ensuring road safety. Knuthenlund is receiving support for increased involvement in organic farming (accredited farming) and the production of goat cheese. There are also plans to convert the 18th-century Ørbygård which overlooks the sea into a hotel.

Stokkemarke's associations and leisure facilities include a badminton club, a gymnastic society, a riding school and a youth centre. The village is well placed for rambling with possibilities for walks through the wooded surroundings. There are footpaths from the village to Knuthenlund and Hestehave.
