= 2025 Lolland municipal election =

Municipal election in Denmark

← 2021	18 November 2025	2029 →

All 25 seats to the Lolland municipal council 13 seats needed for a majority
- Turnout: 21,418 (66.1%) ▲3.0%
	First party	Second party	Third party
	A	Æ	J
Party	Social Democrats	Denmark Democrats	Din Stemme
Last election	12 seats, 41.7%	Did not stand	2 seats, 7.3%
Seats won	6	4	3
Seat change	▼6	▲4	▲1
Popular vote	4,419	3,415	2,715
Percentage	21.0%	16.2%	12.9%
Swing	▼20.7%	New	▲5.6%
	Fourth party	Fifth party	Sixth party
	O	V	F
Party	Danish People's Party	Venstre	Green Left
Last election	1 seat, 5.2%	5 seats, 18.8%	1 seat, 4.0%
Seats won	2	2	2
Seat change	▲1	▼3	▲1
Popular vote	1,879	1,709	1,636
Percentage	8.9%	8.1%	7.8%
Swing	▲3.8%	▼10.7%	▲3.7%
	Seventh party	Eighth party	Ninth party
	L	Ø	C
Party	Lokallisten Lolland	Red-Green Alliance	Conservatives
Last election	1 seat, 5.2%	1 seat, 3.9%	1 seat, 4.6%
Seats won	2	2	2
Seat change	▲1	▲1	▲1
Popular vote	1,532	1,482	1,177
Percentage	7.3%	7.0%	5.6%
Swing	▲2.1%	▲3.1%	▲1.0%
Mayor before election
Holger Schou Rasmussen
the Social Democrats
Mayor after election
Marie-Louise Brehm Nielsen
Din Stemme

The 2025 Lolland Municipal election was held on November 18, 2025, to elect the 25 members to sit in the regional council for the Lolland Municipal council, in the period of 2026 to 2029. Marie-Louise Brehm Nielsen from the local party Din Stemme would win the mayoral position.

== Background ==
Following the 2021 election, Holger Schou Rasmussen from the Social Democrats became mayor for a third term. Despite being just a single seat short of an absolute majority in the last election, the Social Democrats held an absolute majority in the council, at a point prior to this election, following Eric Steffensen party switch from the Danish People's Party to the Social Democrats.

== Electoral system ==
For elections to Danish municipalities, a number varying from 9 to 31 are chosen to be elected to the municipal council. The seats are then allocated using the D'Hondt method and a closed list proportional representation. Lolland Municipality had 25 seats in 2025.

== Electoral alliances ==
=== Electoral Alliance 1 ===
Party		Political alignment
A	Social Democrats	Centre-left
F	Green Left	Centre-left to Left-wing

=== Electoral Alliance 2 ===
Party		Political alignment
B	Social Liberals	Centre to Centre-left
V	Venstre	Centre-right

=== Electoral Alliance 3 ===
Party		Political alignment
C	Conservatives	Centre-right
I	Liberal Alliance	Centre-right to Right-wing
Æ	Denmark Democrats	Right-wing to Far-right

=== Electoral Alliance 4 ===
Party		Political alignment
D	Vestlolland	Local politics
Ø	Red-Green Alliance	Left-wing to Far-Left

== Results by polling station ==
Division	A	B	C	D	F	I	J	L	O	V	Æ	Ø
Division	%	%	%	%	%	%	%	%	%	%	%	%
Errindlev	15.1	0.5	13.5	0.7	5.5	3.6	4.6	4.3	9.9	22.6	14.4	5.3
Holeby	16.6	0.3	5.6	1.2	8.5	3.2	13.5	5.3	11.8	9.9	17.1	7.0
Sandby Kulturhus	17.8	0.4	8.8	3.2	7.3	1.7	17.8	6.0	10.1	6.0	15.5	5.2
Søllested	15.2	0.3	4.3	2.0	6.0	1.8	16.6	12.6	9.5	5.6	20.0	6.0
Maribo	30.5	0.5	7.2	0.4	7.8	2.8	11.5	3.5	8.0	9.2	13.2	5.4
Askø	0.0	0.0	0.0	0.0	0.0	0.0	0.0	80.0	2.5	0.0	2.5	15.0
Østofte	15.7	0.3	5.6	1.3	7.5	3.5	12.1	8.7	10.8	7.5	19.9	7.1
Nakskov	23.2	0.2	5.3	3.2	9.4	1.7	15.2	6.8	8.2	7.7	11.6	7.5
Birket	15.2	0.8	4.3	2.7	6.6	1.6	10.9	12.5	7.8	4.7	22.7	10.2
Fejø	4.0	0.0	1.5	5.6	1.2	0.9	0.3	2.5	1.2	1.9	53.6	27.2
Femø	6.0	0.0	2.4	4.8	2.4	1.2	0.0	60.7	1.2	0.0	9.5	11.9
Horslunde	11.2	0.2	3.9	7.9	5.6	1.3	11.5	20.1	6.3	4.5	21.0	6.6
Dannemare	17.4	0.2	4.4	2.9	6.0	1.4	13.6	7.0	9.1	11.1	19.7	7.0
Rødby	19.3	0.5	5.6	0.4	7.0	3.8	10.9	4.2	11.5	8.9	22.1	5.6
Rødbyhavn	23.3	1.8	3.7	1.9	9.3	3.4	9.5	3.9	12.4	5.5	16.6	8.7

== Results ==
Party		Votes	%	+/-	Seats	+/-
Lolland Municipality
A	Social Democrats	4,419	21.02	-20.70	6	-6
Æ	Denmark Democrats	3,415	16.24	New	4	New
J	Din Stemme	2,715	12.91	+5.59	3	+1
O	Danish People's Party	1,879	8.94	+3.76	2	+1
V	Venstre	1,709	8.13	-10.66	2	-3
F	Green Left	1,636	7.78	+3.75	2	+1
L	Lokallisten Lolland	1,532	7.29	+2.10	2	+1
Ø	Red-Green Alliance	1,482	7.05	+3.11	2	+1
C	Conservatives	1,177	5.60	+0.96	2	+1
I	Liberal Alliance	493	2.34	New	0	New
D	Vestlolland	490	2.33	New	0	New
B	Social Liberals	78	0.37	-0.34	0	0
Total		21,025	100	N/A	25	N/A
Invalid votes		111	0.34	+0.04		
Blank votes		282	0.87	-0.14		
Turnout		21,418	66.10	+3.04		
Source: valg.dk

== Opinion polls ==
Polling firm	Fieldwork date	Sample size	A	V	J	L	O	C	F	Ø	B	D	I	Æ	Others	Lead
Epinion	4 Sep - 13 Oct 2025	419	31.7	9.5	–	–	8.2	5.1	7.7	7.0	0.3	–	5.7	14.4	10.5	17.3
2024 european parliament election	9 Jun 2024		25.4	12.3	–	–	12.5	9.1	13.9	4.1	2.6	–	3.8	10.1	–	11.5
2022 general election	1 Nov 2022		43.6	10.1	–	–	5.8	3.0	6.3	2.7	0.8	–	3.7	10.4	–	33.2
2021 regional election	16 Nov 2021		60.5	11.6	–	–	4.6	4.5	3.3	3.2	1.1	–	0.4	–	–	48.9
2021 municipal election	16 Nov 2021		41.7 (12)	18.8 (5)	7.3 (2)	5.2 (1)	5.2 (1)	4.6 (1)	4.0 (1)	3.9 (1)	0.7 (0)	–	–	–	–	22.9
