= 2021 Lolland municipal election (Denmark) =

← 2017	16 November 2021	2025 →

All 25 seats to the Lolland Municipal Council 13 seats needed for a majority
- Turnout: 20,820 (63.1%) ▼5.5%
	First party	Second party	Third party
	A	V	H
Party	Social Democrats	Venstre	Din Stemme
Last election	11 seats, 39.6%	5 seats, 16.5%	2 seats, 7.8%
Seats won	12	5	2
Seat change	▲1	0	0
Popular vote	8,686	3,911	1,524
Percentage	41.7%	18.8%	7.3%
Swing	▲2.1%	▲2.3%	▼0.5%
	Fourth party	Fifth party	Sixth party
	L	O	C
Party	Lokalisten Lolland	Danish People's Party	Conservatives
Last election	2 seats, 9.7%	3 seats, 10.1%	0 seats, 1.9%
Seats won	1	1	1
Seat change	▼1	▼2	▲1
Popular vote	1,079	1,078	966
Percentage	5.2%	5.2%	4.6%
Swing	▼4.5%	▼4.9%	▲2.7%
	Seventh party	Eighth party	Ninth party
	F	Ø	N
Party	Green Left	Red–Green Alliance	Nakskov Listen
Last election	1 seat, 5.2%	1 seat, 4.1%	0 seats, 0%
Seats won	1	1	1
Seat change	0	0	▲1
Popular vote	840	821	740
Percentage	4.0%	3.9%	3.6%
Swing	▼1.2%	▼0.2%	▲3.6%
Mayor before election
Holger Schou Rasmussen
Social Democrats
Mayor after election
Holger Schou Rasmussen
Social Democrats

The Social Democrats have since the 2007 municipal reform held the mayor's position in Lolland municipality. They've always been the largest party by number of seats, however both them and Venstre had nine seats in 2014–2017.

In the previous election the Social Democrats had won 11 seats, 6 more than second-place Venstre. The traditional red bloc had therefore 13 of the 25 seats, and a majority. This led to Holger Schou Rasmussen from the Social Democrats becoming mayor. He would stand for re-election in this election, and for a third term. It was expected that he would have success.

Once again the Social Democrats would become the biggest party, and ended up only one short of an absolute majority. Fellow red bloc parties, Green Left and Red–Green Alliance, would decrease their vote share by 1.2 and 0.2 points respectively, however none of them lost a seat. Therefore, there were 14 red seats, and Holger Schou Rasmussen was in pole position to win a third term. It was eventually confirmed that he would continue as mayor.

In November 2022 Eric Steffensen switched party affiliation from Danish People's Party to the Social Democrats, and this means that the Social Democrats currently holds 13 seats and an absolute majority in Lolland's municipal council.

== Electoral system ==
For elections to Danish municipalities, a number varying from 9 to 31 are chosen to be elected to the municipal council. The seats are then allocated using the D'Hondt method and a closed list proportional representation. Lolland Municipality had 25 seats in 2021

Unlike in Danish general elections, in municipal elections electoral alliances are allowed.

== Electoral alliances ==
=== Electoral Alliance 1 ===
Party		Political alignment
F	Green Left	Centre-left to Left-wing
Ø	Red–Green Alliance	Left-wing to Far-Left

=== Electoral Alliance 2 ===
Party		Political alignment
B	Social Liberals	Centre to Centre-left
L	Lokallisten Lolland	Local politics

=== Electoral Alliance 3 ===
Party		Political alignment
J	Vestfronten	Local politics
N	Nakskov listen	Local politics

=== Electoral Alliance 4 ===
Party		Political alignment
O	Danish People's Party	Right-wing to Far-right
V	Venstre	Centre-right

== Results by polling station ==
H = Din Stemme
J = Vestfrosten
L = Lokalisten Lolland
N = Nakskov Listen

Division	A	B	C	D	F	H	J	L	N	O	V	Ø
Division	%	%	%	%	%	%	%	%	%	%	%	%
Errindlev	36.8	0.2	6.2	4.1	3.2	6.6	0.0	3.0	0.0	6.8	29.9	3.2
Holeby	46.6	0.9	4.8	3.3	3.2	7.9	0.1	4.1	0.3	5.1	20.4	3.3
Sandby	36.6	0.6	7.2	3.1	3.5	11.9	0.8	4.3	4.3	6.6	16.7	4.3
Søllested	37.5	1.0	5.0	4.1	2.7	10.7	3.8	4.2	2.3	6.7	18.6	3.5
Nakskov Vest	42.5	0.4	3.7	2.6	4.4	5.5	4.0	7.1	8.2	4.5	13.9	3.0
Østofte	38.4	0.6	4.8	4.0	3.9	8.3	0.4	3.4	0.3	5.7	23.8	6.4
Askø	21.4	0.0	0.0	4.8	0.0	0.0	2.4	0.0	0.0	7.1	64.3	0.0
Maribo	48.5	1.3	4.6	2.0	3.3	7.3	0.1	3.9	0.1	3.7	21.7	3.3
Nakskov Øst	40.6	0.5	4.5	2.6	4.5	6.9	3.6	6.5	7.2	4.0	16.7	2.3
Birket	34.8	0.0	2.4	3.6	7.6	5.2	0.8	4.0	2.0	8.4	21.6	9.6
Fejø	36.2	1.7	3.1	4.9	4.2	1.0	2.1	12.9	0.7	5.9	19.9	7.3
Femø	26.3	0.0	10.0	2.5	11.3	6.3	0.0	3.8	0.0	3.8	30.0	6.3
Rødbyhavn	45.3	1.1	5.2	4.1	3.9	4.0	0.0	9.1	1.0	6.6	11.7	8.1
Rødby	42.0	0.6	5.8	5.2	4.1	6.2	0.0	3.9	0.4	5.8	20.5	5.5
Dannemare	32.5	0.6	4.3	2.5	3.0	14.7	1.6	4.4	6.0	7.9	18.3	4.2
Horslunde	39.6	0.1	5.1	5.3	6.9	5.7	1.2	3.9	4.8	5.5	18.6	3.4

== Results ==
Party		Votes	%	+/-	Seats	+/-
Lolland Municipality
A	Social Democrats	8,686	41.72	+2.09	12	+1
V	Venstre	3,911	18.78	+2.28	5	0
H	Din Stemme	1,524	7.32	-0.43	2	0
L	Lokallisten Lolland	1,079	5.18	-4.51	1	-1
O	Danish People's Party	1,078	5.18	-4.93	1	-2
C	Conservatives	966	4.64	+2.73	1	+1
F	Green Left	840	4.03	-1.14	1	0
Ø	Red-Green Alliance	821	3.94	-0.19	1	0
N	Nakskov listen	740	3.55	New	1	New
D	New Right	672	3.23	+2.30	0	0
J	Vestfronten	356	1.71	New	0	New
B	Social Liberals	147	0.71	0.0	0	0
Total		20,820	100	N/A	25	N/A
Invalid votes		102	0.30	+0.03		
Blank votes		318	0.94	-0.08		
Turnout		21,240	63.05	-5.50		
Source: valg.dk
