= Holeby Municipality =

Municipality on the island of Lolland in Denmark

Coordinates: 54°42′45″N 11°27′40″E

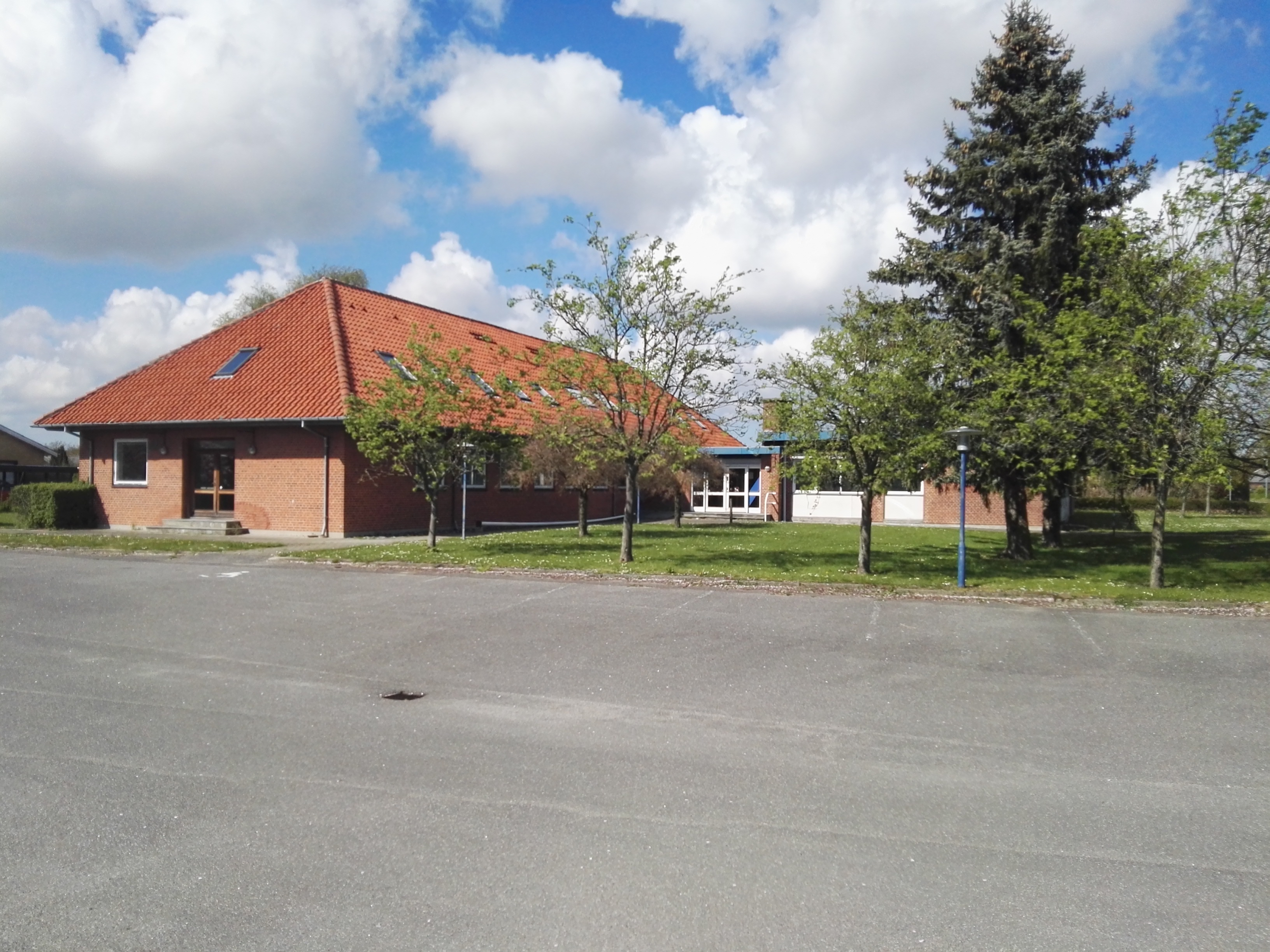

Holeby was a municipality (Danish, kommune) on the island of Lolland in Storstrøm County in south Denmark. The municipality covered an area of 116 km^{2}, and had a total population of 3,982 (2005). Its last mayor was Bjarne Larsen.

The main town and the seat of its municipal council was the town of Holeby.

Neighboring municipalities were Nysted to the east, Maribo and Sakskøbing to the north, and Rødby to the west. To the south was the Baltic Sea and the Fehmarn Belt.

On 1 January 2007 Holeby municipality ceased to exist as the result of Kommunalreformen ("The Municipality Reform" of 2007). It merged with the municipalities of Højreby, Maribo, Nakskov, Ravnsborg, Rudbjerg and Rødby to form the new Lolland municipality. This created a municipality with an area of 892 km^{2} and a total population of 49,469 (2005). The new municipality belongs to the new Region Sjælland ("Zealand Region").
