= Rødby railway station =

Railway station under construction in Holeby, Denmark

Coordinates: 54°40′51″N 11°25′54″E

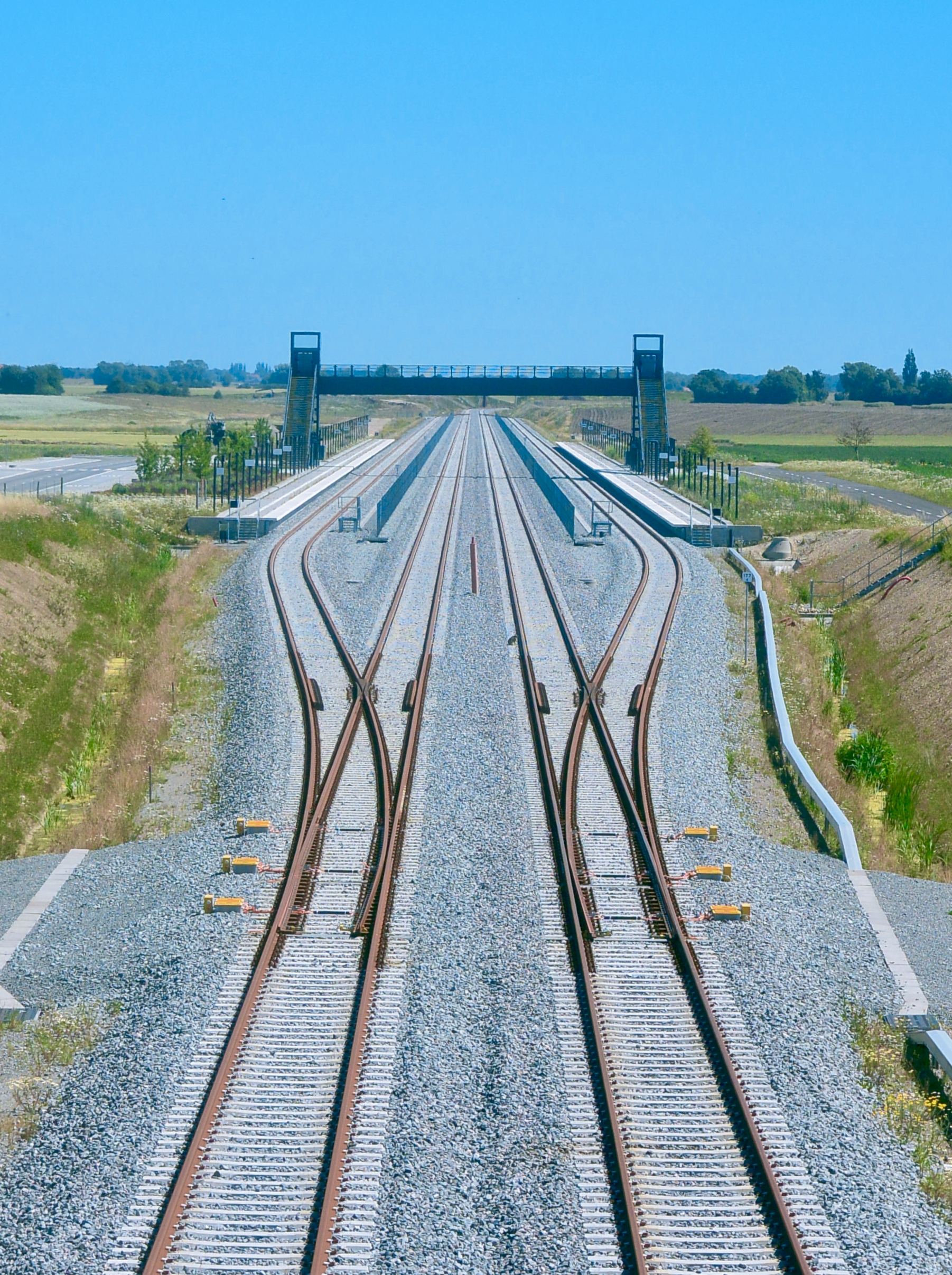
- The station under construction in 2025
- Location: Rødby, Lolland
- Project website: https://danskejernbaner.dk/vis.station.php?FORLOEB_ID=2519
- Completion date: 2028
- Stakeholders: DSB

A train station is under construction between Rødby and Holeby, Lolland Municipality, in Region Zealand, Denmark on the upgraded and moved railway line from Nykøbing Falster to the Fehmarn Belt fixed link that is also under construction. The station is planned on Ladhavevej, east of Rødby and south of Holeby. The station will have four tracks.

The railway administration preliminarily called the new station Holeby after a nearby village, partly to distinguish it from the old station Rødby Færge railway station which was closed in 2021. There was a suggestion from the municipality to call it Rødby after the more well-known village, and in 2023 this was confirmed. In 2021, construction on the upgraded railway with the new station started.
