= Ravnsborg =

Former municipality of Denmark

Until 1 January 2007 Ravnsborg was a municipality (Danish, kommune) on the northwest coast of the island of Lolland in the former Storstrøm County in south Denmark. The municipality, including the islands of Fejø and Femø, covered an area of 198 km^{2}, and in 2005 had a total population of 5,569. Its last mayor was Stig Vestergård, a member of the Social Democrats (Socialdemokraterne) political party. The main town and the site of its municipal council was the town of Horslunde.

A ferry service connects the former municipality to Langeland from a harbour west of the town of Sandby, and to the islands of Fejø and Femø from the town of Kragenæs.

In 2007, Ravnsborg municipality ceased to exist as the result of the Strukturreformen, a government initiative which reorganised municipalities. The functions of the municipality were merged with the existing Holeby, Højreby, Maribo, Nakskov, Rudbjerg and Rødby municipalities to form the new Lolland Municipality. This created a municipality with an area of 892 km^{2} and a total population of 49,469 (2005). The new municipality belongs to Region Zealand ("Region Sjælland").
