= Din Stemme =

Din Stemme Din Stemme
- Headquarters: Lolland
- Ideology: Local politics
- Colors: Light blue
- Municipal councils: 3 / 25 (Note: Of Seats in Lolland municipal council)

Din Stemme is a Danish local political party from Lolland Municipality. It was established in 2017.

== History ==
In 2025, the party won the mayoral position of Lolland municipality.

== Election results ==
=== Municipal elections ===
Date	Votes		Seats	±
Date	#	%	Seats	±
2017	1,814	7.8	2 / 25	New
2021	1,524	7.3	2 / 25	0
2025	2,715	12.9	3 / 25	▲1
