= Codan Medical =

Danish medical equipment manufacturer

CODAN Medical
- Company type: Private
- Industry: Health care
- Founded: 1939
- Founder: Sven Husted-Andersen
- Headquarters: Rødby, Denmark, Denmark
- Revenue: DKK 1.1 billion (2017)
- Operating income: DKK 177 million (2017)
- Number of employees: 475 (2017)
- Website: www.codanmedical.com

Codan Medical is a privately owned manufacturer of medical equipment based in Rødby, Lolland Municipality, Denmark.

== History ==
CODAN Medical was founded in 1939 by Sven Husted-Andersen. It was later passed on to his son, Stig Husted-Andersen, who died in 2008. The company is now owned by his three daughters, Deirdre, Alexandra and Stefanie Husted-Andersen.
