= Birket Church =

Coordinates: 54°53′26″N 11°19′55″E

- Birket Kirke
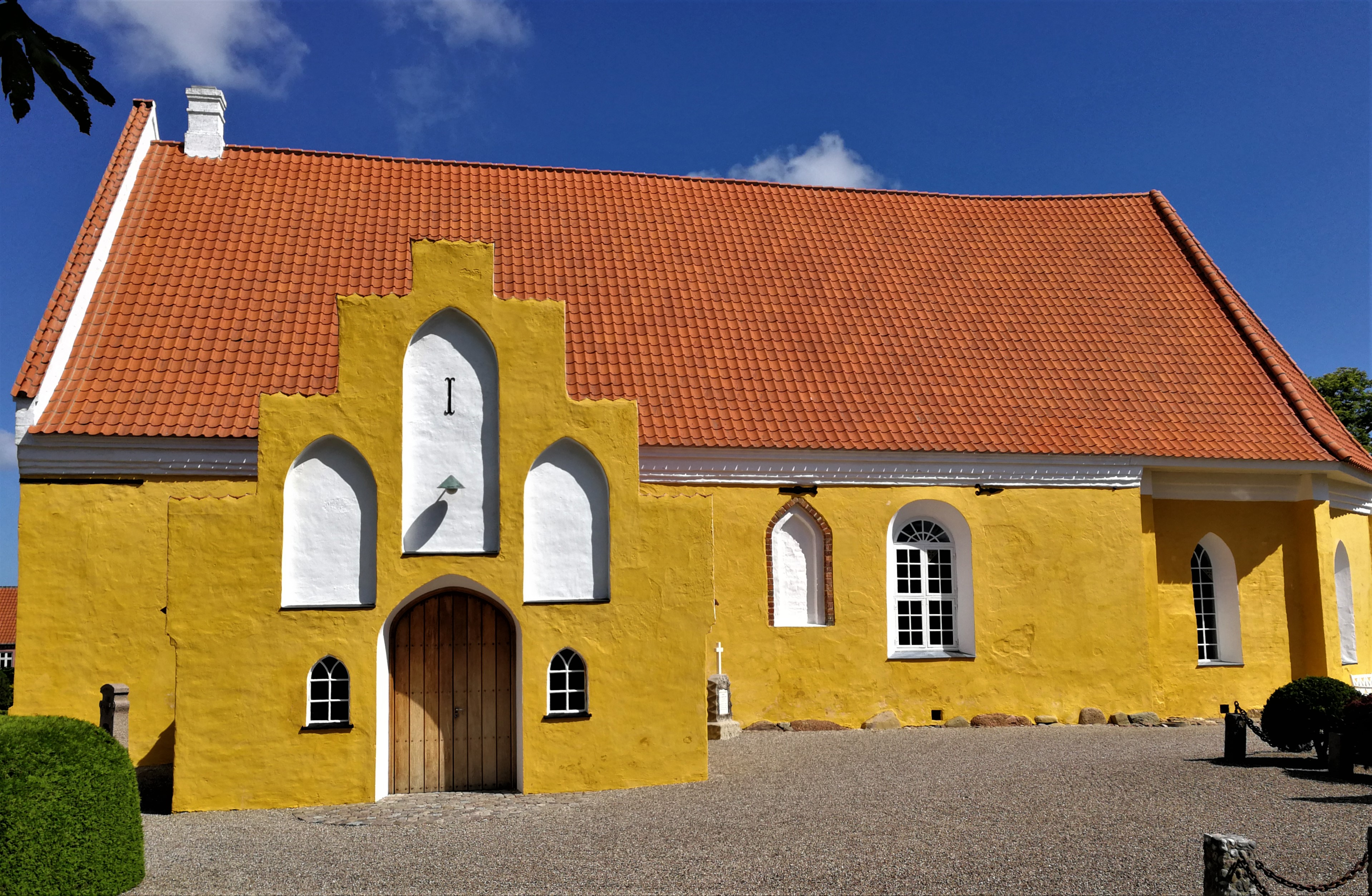
- Birket Church
- Location: Birket, Lolland
- Country: Denmark
- Denomination: Church of Denmark

Architecture
- Style: Gothic architecture

Administration
- Diocese: Diocese of Lolland–Falster
- Parish: Birket Sogn

Birket Church (Danish: Birket Kirke) is located south of the little village of Birket, some 14 km (8.7 mi) northeast of Nakskov on the Danish island of Lolland. Its chancel was originally the nave of the brick Gothic church built in 1350. The bell tower, which stands apart from the church, is believed to be Denmark's oldest standing wooden structure.

== History ==
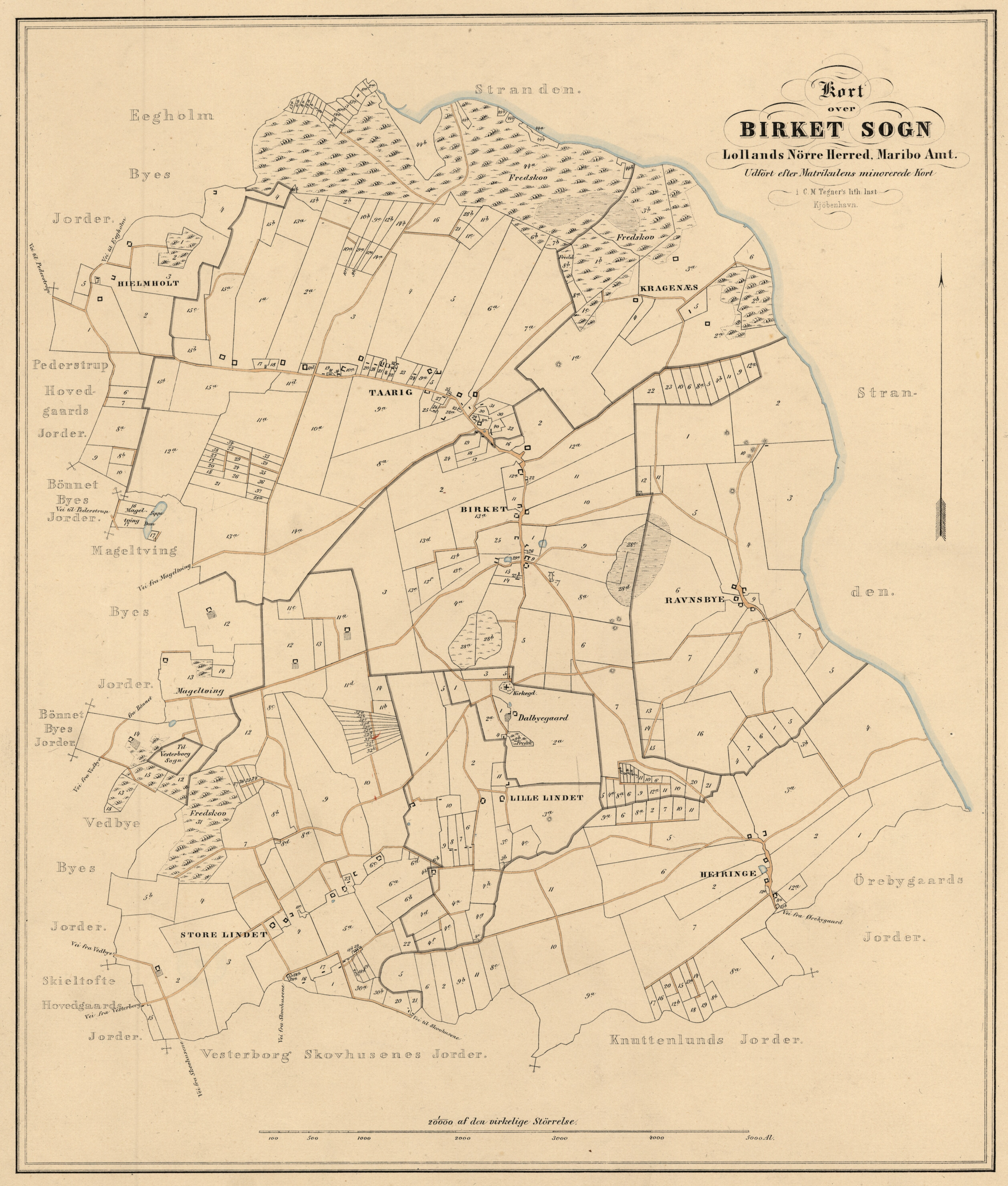
Map of Birket Parish.

Built around 1350, the church is rather younger than many country churches in the area which are typically from the 12th and 13th centuries. Until 1687, it had its own parish priest but it was then annexed to Vesterborg until 1914. After the Reformation it came under the ownership of the Crown but in 1686 was transferred to Pedr Brandt of Pederstrup. The church became independent in 1914.

== Architecture ==
The church, built of brick on a fieldstone base, consists of a chancel, a nave and a porch. The chancel with its three-sided eastern gable is all that remains of the original brick building from c. 1350. Around 1500, the original nave was replaced by the nave in the Late Gothic style which stands today. The vaulted ceilings of the nave and chancel were added at the same time. The church's exterior is now plastered over and painted yellow.

== Bell Tower ==
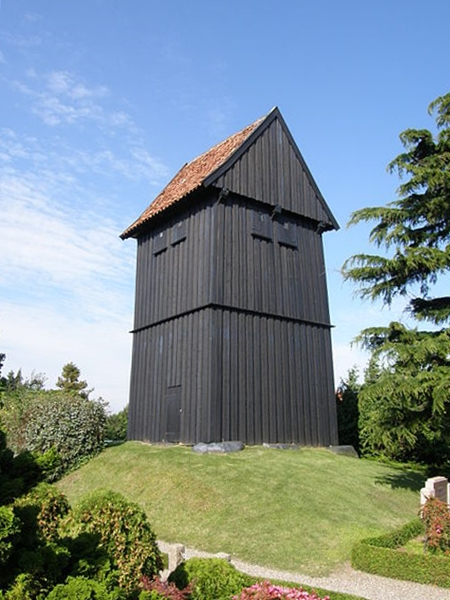
Wooden bell tower (c. 1350)

The wooden bell tower which stands apart from the church near the main entrance to the churchyard is the best preserved example of its kind in Denmark's country churches and one of the finest Medieval timber structures still standing in Denmark and possibly the oldest. Built on the top of an ancient burial mound, it consists of a heavy framework of oak on a fieldstone foundation. The exterior covering of tarred planks has been replaced several times over the years, most recently in 1974. It was one of the bell towers studied when the open-air museum Middelaldercentret on western Lolland build a bell tower in 2009.

== Interior ==
The church's former altarpiece, a triptych carved by Benedict Dreyer of Lübeck in the early 16th century, is now in the National Museum. It has been replaced by a painting from c. 1800 of Christ's burial attributed to Johan Georg Wahl. The pulpit from the second half of the 18th century has been put together from pieces of various origins, some perhaps from an earlier pulpit. The polygonal Gothic font, as old as the church itself, is in Gotland limestone. Its reliefs depict two birds, an eagle, a cock and a fanciful combination of a lion's body, a horse's head and a human face.

== Frescos ==
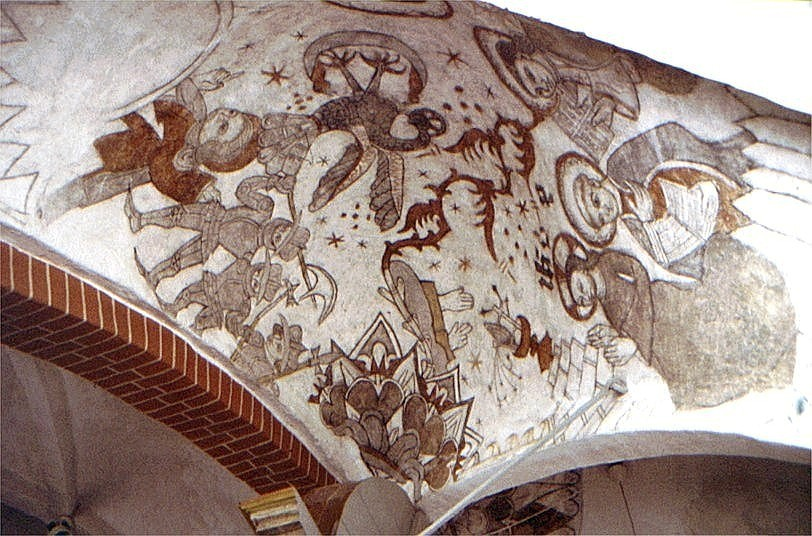
Frescos in the chancel

In 1900, frescos depicting a Gethsemane scene were discovered in the chancel by Jacob Kornerup who restored them in 1910. Jesus is depicted before an altar bearing a chalice containing rice, corn and a whip. The three apostles are shown reading as soldiers in armor typical of the 16th century arrive. A pelican with a halo stands in the centre, reflecting a passage from Revelation.

== See also ==
- List of churches on Lolland
