= August Winding =

Danish composer

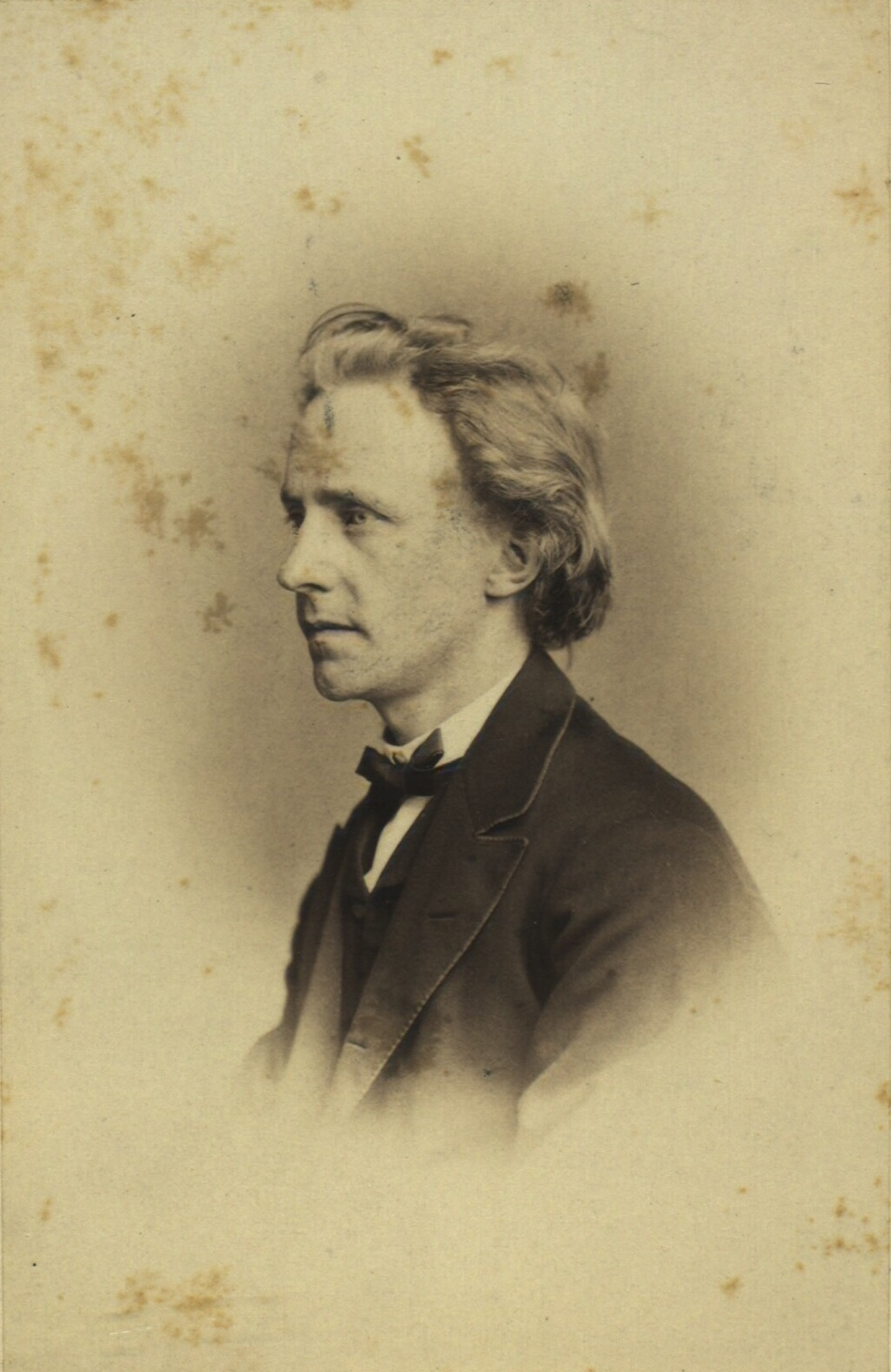
August Winding in 1865

August Winding (24 March 1835 – 16 June 1899) was a Danish pianist, teacher and composer.

== Life ==
=== Early life and education ===
August Henrik Winding was born in Tårs, near Sandby on the island of Lolland. His father was a clergyman who collected and arranged Danish folk songs, and also an excellent pianist who became his son's first music teacher. August's three brothers were equally highly musical, most of all his brother Peter Buonaventura who, despite his early death at the age of 16, had some of his works published. In 1847, August's parents sent the 12 year old to Copenhagen for musical education. He stayed there at the house of Johan Peter Emilius Hartmann and was given piano lessons by Carl Reinecke until the latter's departure for Paris in 1848, and then by Anton Rée (1820–1886), who had been an acquaintance of Frédéric Chopin. He also was taught theory and composition by Niels Gade. In 1856 he went to Leipzig for further studies, and then had lessons with Alexander Dreyschock in Prague. who called him «the best of his pupils hitherto».

=== Pianist ===
His public career was originally as a pianist; he became rapidly the leading pianist of his days in Denmark, but also played in many countries of Europe, specialising in Beethoven and Mozart. His "calling card" was Beethoven's 4th Piano Concerto.

In 1864 he married J. P. E. Hartmann's daughter Clara (Niels Gade married another daughter). In 1867 he became a teacher at the Royal Danish Conservatory in Copenhagen and also privately.

August Winding was one of Edvard Grieg's closest friends.

=== Arm injury and career as a composer ===
In 1867 he injured his arm through overwork, which forced his retirement as a performer but also enabled him to devote himself to composing. In 1881, he resumed his pedagogical activity at the conservatorium. Between 1888 and his death he gave some further concerts.

=== Death and legacy ===
August Winding died in 1899 in Copenhagen, aged 64. He is buried in Søllerød graveyard. He was survived by a daughter, Ingeborg Winding (1871–1908), a painter and the mother of architects and designers Mogens and Flemming Lassen, and a son, Poul Andreas Winding (1877–1966), a violinist.

== Style and legacy ==
His music was for many years virtually forgotten, apart from some hymn tunes, but attention is now being paid to his major works.

== Compositions ==
=== Orchestral ===
- Nordic Overture, Op. 7 (1864)
- Concert Overture (published in 1885), Op. 14
- Symphony in C minor, Op. 39, dedicated to Emil Hartmann
- Symphony (1858–59)
- Ballet Fjeldstuen (The Mountain Hut, or Twenty Years; 1859; co-written with his brother-in law Emil Hartmann). Winding wrote the first part, and among others:
  - "Sæterpigernes Dands om det nydødbte Barn"
  - "Huldredands"
  - "Springdands"

=== Concertante ===
- Violin Concerto in A major, Op. 11 (created by Wilhelmine Neruda on 2 March 1867 in Copenhagen)
- Piano Concerto in A minor, Op. 16
- Concert Allegro in C minor, Op. 29, for piano and orchestra

=== Chamber works ===
- First Sonata for violin and piano, in g minor, Op. 5 (dedicated to Wilhelmine Neruda)
- Sonata for cello and piano, Op. 10 (1854, manuscript, dedicated to J.P.E. Hartmann)
- Piano Quartet in D major, Op. 17 (created at the Gewandhaus in Leipzig)
- Three Fantasy Pieces, Op. 19, for clarinet or violin and piano (1872)
- String Quintet in D, Op. 23 (2 violins, 2 violas, cello)
- Second Sonata for violin and piano, Op. 35
- Elegi for violin (or Oboe) and piano, Op. 41
- Aftenstemning for violin and organ or piano, Op. 47 b
- Miniature Suite for violin and piano
- Three Canzonettas for violin and piano

=== Piano pieces ===
- Three Fantasy Pieces, Op. 1
- Reisebilder (Eight pieces), Op. 3
- Four Pieces (Festmarsch, Intermezzo, Scherzo, Romance), Op. 6
- Landlige Scener: Skizzer for Piano (Seven Pieces), Op. 9
- Studier og Stemninger (Six Pieces), Op. 10
- Allegro, Romance, Finale, Op. 13
- Genrebilleder (Twelve Pieces dedicated to Franz Neruda), Op. 15
- Ten Pieces in Etudeform, Op. 18*
- Aus der Ferienzeit (Sommerminder, Seven Pieces for Piano), Op. 22
- Five Pieces in Etudeform, Op. 24
- Tonebilleder (Four Pieces), Op. 25
- Preludes in all the Keys, Op. 26 (Dedicated to Isidor Seiss):
  1. in C major: Poco adagio, maestoso e con nobilità
  2. in A minor: Allegro agitato ed affetuoso
  3. in F major: Comodo
  4. in D minor: Allegro risoluto e energico
  5. in B♭ major: Allegro non troppo. Giocoso, con allegrezza
  6. in G minor: Moderato con fierezza
  7. in E♭ major: Andante innocente e tenero
  8. in C minor: Presto impetuoso
  9. in A♭ major: Allegro non troppo con dolcezza
  10. in F minor: Allegro moderato, poco agitato
  11. in D♭ major: Con moto. Soave e con grazia
  12. in B♭ minor: Andantino quasi Allegretto, Grave e mesto
  13. in G♭ major: Allegro vivace con calore e molto animato
  14. in E♭ minor: Presto furioso e con strepito
  15. in B major: Allegretto tranquillo e dolce
  16. in G♯ minor: Allegretto dolente e malinconico
  17. in E major: Moderato grazioso e con tenerezza
  18. in C♯ minor: Allegro energico e molt’ appassionato
  19. in A major: Allegretto dolce e piacevole
  20. in F♯ minor: Andantino con duolo
  21. in D major: Allegro con vivacità ed anima
  22. in B minor: Adagio grave e lugubre
  23. in G major: Allegro molto con gran vivacità
  24. in E minor: Andante sostenuto, quasi una fantasia
  25. Postludium in C major: Poco Adagio, maestoso e con nobilità.
- Three Pieces for the left hand (Capriccio, Canzonetta, Finale), Op 27
- Kontraster (Thirteen Pieces), Op. 28
- Sange ved Klaveret, Op. 30 (Four Pieces, Im Winter, Im Mai, Herbstlied, Sommergruss, dedicated to Theodor Kirchner)
- Four Etudes, Op. 31
- Fra Unge Dage, Dandse, Marscher og Karakterstykker, for piano four hands, Op. 32, dedicated to Christian Barnekow
- Albumsblade (Three Pieces, dedicated to Bodil Neergaard, née Hartmann), Op. 33
- Three Pieces (Toccata, Notturno, Etude), Op. 34
- Four Etudes, Op 36
- Idyller og Legender, for piano, Op. 37
- Danserytmer i forskellig Stil (Nordisk Folkedans, Ländler, Valse, Giga), Op. 38
- Minore e Maggiore (Six Pieces dedicated to Godfred Matthison- Hansen), Op. 40
- Toccata, Op 43
- Aus de Ersten Heimat, Op. 44
- Aus Nah und Fern (Nine pieces), Op. 45
- Albumblätter, Op 46
- Aftenstemning, Op. 47 b
- Klaverstykker i Etudeform, Op. 48
- Eight Studies, Op. 51
- Aus der Kinderwelt, Fourteen little pieces for small hands, Op. 51
- Four Studies, Op. 60
- Humoreske (Den Vægelsindede)
- XXV Danske Folkeviser for Piano four hands
- Cadenza for Mozart's Piano Concerto No. 21 in C major
- Cadenza for Mozart's Piano Concerto No 23 in a major
- Cadenza for Mozart's Piano Concerto No 26 in d major
- Cadenza for Beethoven's Piano Concerto No. 3 in C minor
- Transcription of ten chorale preludes by Johann Sebastian Bach
- Piano reduction of Niels Gade's cantata Baldurs drøm

=== Songs, romances, lieder and hymns ===
Among others songs for one voice and piano Op. 2, Op. 3, Op. 4, Op. 8, Op.14, Op. 47 a, and Op. 50, and Songs for Choir and Orchestra, Op. 12

=== Various other pieces for piano (two and four hands) ===
Frühlingsstimmung, Albumsblatt in E minor, Sonate facile et instructive, Valse-Impromptu, Ellen-Vals, Valse caractéristique, Romance et Valse mélancolique, Allegro non troppo
