= Rudbjerg =

Former municipality in Denmark

Coordinates: 54°45′N 11°07′E

Until 1 January 2007 Rudbjerg was a municipality (Danish, kommune) on the southwest coast of the island of Lolland in the former Storstrøm County, southern Denmark. The municipality covered an area of 143 km^{2}, and had a total population of 3,432 (2005). Its last mayor was Tom Larsen, a member of the Venstre (Liberal Party) political party. The main town and the site of its municipal council was Dannemare.

Rudbjerg municipality ceased to exist as the result of Kommunalreformen ("The Municipality Reform" of 2007). It was merged with existing Holeby, Højreby, Maribo, Nakskov, Ravnsborg, and Rødby municipalities to form the new Lolland municipality. This created a municipality with an area of 892 km^{2} and a total population of 49,469 (2005). The new municipality belongs to Region Sjælland (Zealand Region).
