= Højreby =

Former municipality of Denmark

Coordinates: 54°48′N 11°17′E

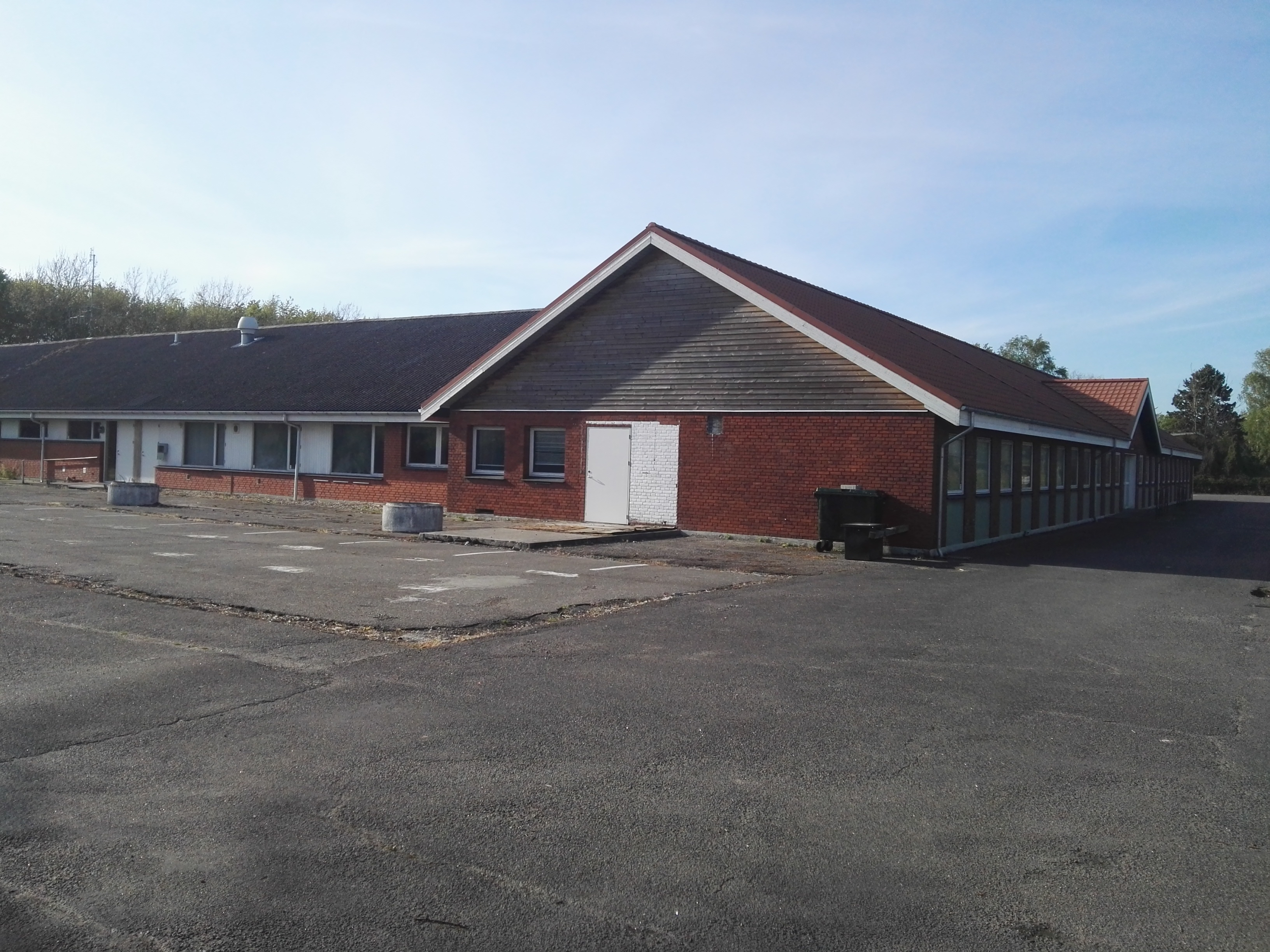
The former Højreby Municipality town hall

Until 1 January 2007 Højreby was a municipality (Danish, kommune) on the island of Lolland in Storstrøm County in south Denmark. The municipality covered an area of 128 km^{2} (49 sq mi), and had a total population of 4,049 (2005). Its last mayor was Jytte Frijs, a member of the Venstre (Liberal Party) political party. The site of its municipal council was the town of Søllested.

Højreby municipality ceased to exist as the result of Kommunalreformen ("The Municipality Reform" of 2007). It was merged with existing Holeby, Maribo, Nakskov, Ravnsborg, Rudbjerg and Rødby municipalities to form the new Lolland municipality. This created a municipality with an area of 892 km^{2} (344 sq mi) and a total population of 49,469 (2005). The new municipality belongs to Region Sjælland ("Zealand Region").
