= Benedikt Dreyer =

German artist

Benedikt Dreyer (born before 1495 - died after 1555) was a German sculptor, carver and painter working in Lübeck.

Dreyer was an apprentice in Lüneburg (1506–1507), and was a house owner in Lübeck until 1555, according to the land register.

He made a Gothic altar (1522), the "Antonius altar" from Burg Church in Lübeck, which is part of the remarkable collection of medieval art in the St. Annen Museum in Lübeck. Another altar also in the same museum is attributed to him: the "Last Judgment" altar from Tramm Church in the district of Lauenburg.

Another altar attributed to Dreyer, that from Birket Church in Lolland, is in the collection of The National Museum of Denmark in Copenhagen.

Attributed to him also is "God the Father with the Dead Christ" (1513–20) at Heiligengeist Hospital in Lübeck.
