= Gutte Eriksen =

Danish ceramist

- Born: 20 November, 1918; Rødby Lolland, Denmark
- Died: 8 July, 2008
- Known for: Pottery

Gudrum "Gutte" Agnete Tryde Eriksen (20 November 1918 – 8 July 2008) was a Danish ceramist whose works were influenced by the years she spent in Japan studying Asian techniques. It is above all the specially produced glaze which is the distinguishing feature of her undecorated pottery. As a result of both her work and her teaching, she has exerted considerable influence on Danish potters.

== Biography ==
Born in Rødby on 20 November 1918, Gudrum Agnete Tryde Eriksen was the daughter of the parish priest Erik Eriksen (1870–1947) and Louise Tryde (1876–1966). From 1936, she attended the School of Arts and Crafts where she specialized in ceramics, graduating in 1939. While still studying, she exhibited at the Charlottenborg autumn exhibition in 1938, inspired by old artefacts she had seen in the National Museum.

The demand for ceramics during the Second World War encouraged production in the early 1940s and thereafter. Eriksen first collaborated with Åse Feilberg and Christian Frederiksen in Hareskov before establishing her own workshop in Kastrup in 1942. That year she also successfully exhibited in Stockholm in the Dansk Kunsthaandværk (Danish Craftmanship) show organized by Mogens Koch. When the exhibition came to Copenhagen's Danish Design Museum, she sold a piece titled Søpindsvinet (The Sea Urchin) to the museum.

In 1948, Eriksen went to St Ives in England where she stayed with the potter Bernard Leach who had gained significance by publishing A Potter's Book in 1940. It was based on his familiarity with Chinese and Japanese pottery. She then went to France where she visited the potters Vassil Ivanoff in La Borne, a hamlet in Henrichemont, and Eugène Lion in Saint-Amand-en-Puisaye.

After spending a couple of years working with Felix Møhl (1906–85), Eriksen established her own workshop in an old school in Hundested where she became a pioneering Danish potter, soon becoming recognized internationally. From 1948, her distinctive works bore no decoration, relying on a glaze she learnt from the English ceramist, Michael Gill (born 1927) in 1950. She developed the technique herself, producing blue, brown and grey artefacts. The glaze consisted of a combination of borax, quartz, clay and ash.

In the early 1970s, Eriksen travelled to central Japan on several occasions, once again meeting Bernard Leach and studying Korean techniques which inspired her later work.

Eriksen's work has been widely exhibited, both in Denmark and abroad, with solo exhibitions in Germany, France, England, Sweden and the United States. A large retrospective exhibition was held at the Vejen Art Museum in Jutland in the summer of 2001. She has received many awards, including the Tagea Brandt Rejselegat (1969) and Thorvald Bindesbøll Medal (1985), the Prince Eugen Medal (2000) and the C. F. Hansen Medal (2004).

Gutte Eriksen died on 8 July 2008.

== Personal life ==
In 1951, Eriksen married the painter Preben Hansen with whom she had two children, a daughter and a son.
