= Reventlow Asylum =

- Reventlow-asylet
- Interactive map of the Reventlow Asylum area

General information
- Location: Horslunde, Denmark
- Coordinates: 54°54′30.49″N 11°13′3.43″E
- Completed: 1824
- Renovated: 1889s

The Reventlow Asylum (Danish: Reventlow-asylet) is a half-timbered building in Horslunde on the island of Lolland, Denmark. It was listed in the Danish registry of protected buildings and places in 1964.

== History ==
The Reventlow family were major landowners on Lolland. Pederstrip Manor was the centre of their holdings on the island. The Reventlow Asylum in Horslunde was constructed in 1824 as a home for six to eight old women. It is located opposite the village's old poorhouse from the 18th century. Prime minister D.F. Reventlow is interred at Horslunde Cemetery next to the building. The dilapidated building was subject to a comprehensive restoration in the 1990s. It was carried out by the Vordingborg-based architecture firm Arp & Nielsen.

== Architecture ==
The building is constructed with timber framing but plastered, leaving the timber framing only visible on the upper parts of the gables. The main entrance is located in a curved avant-corps on the north side of the building. The building has a half-hipped, thatched roof. The roof ridge is pierced by a white-plastered chimney.

== Today ==
The building is now used by the local congregation as well as by the grave-digger at Horslunde Church.
