= Sandby Church =

Coordinates: 54°52′25″N 11°05′30″E

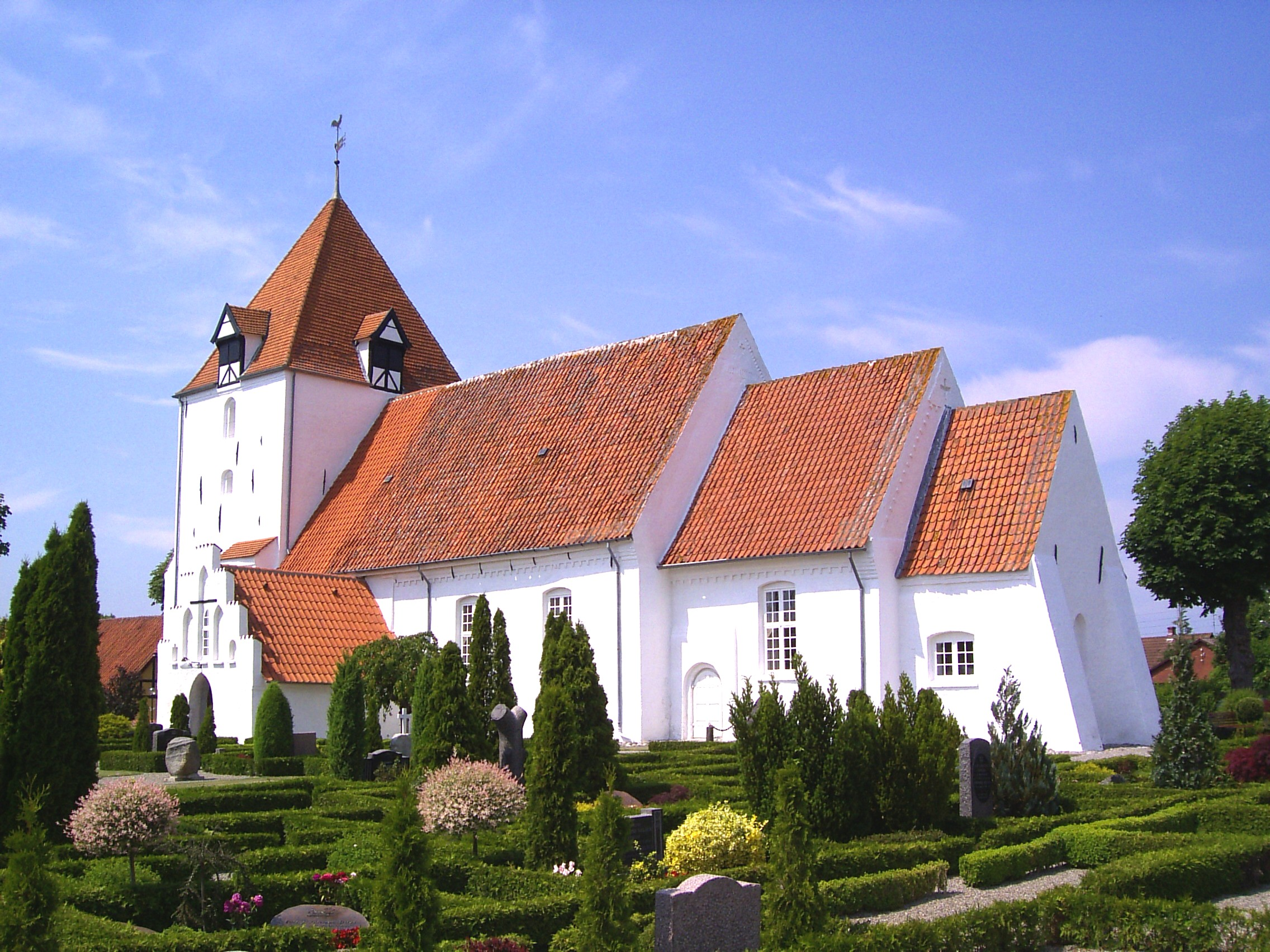
Sandby Church

Sandby Church is located in the village of Sandby some 7 km northwest of Nakskov on the Danish island of Lolland. Dating from the middle of the 13th century, the church has a Romanesque chancel and nave and a Late Gothic tower.

== History ==
Little is known of the church's early history other than the Crown had clerical appointment rights before the Reformation. It remained under the Crown until 1679 when it was transferred to the episcopal authority of Funen. In 1726, it passed into the ownership of the Danneskiold-Samsøe til Lundegaard estate, later the seat of the Barony of Christiansdal under the Knuth dynasty. After the termination of the barony in 1804, the church was bought by the Hardenberg estate until it gained independence in 1912.

== Architecture ==
The church is built of red brick, now whitewashed, and has a red tile roof. In addition to the Romanesque chancel and nave, there was originally also an apse. The tower, porch and sacristy were added in the Late Gothic period. Toothed cornice decorations top the walls of the nave and chancel where traces of former rounded Romanesque windows and doors can still be seen.

== Interior and fittings ==
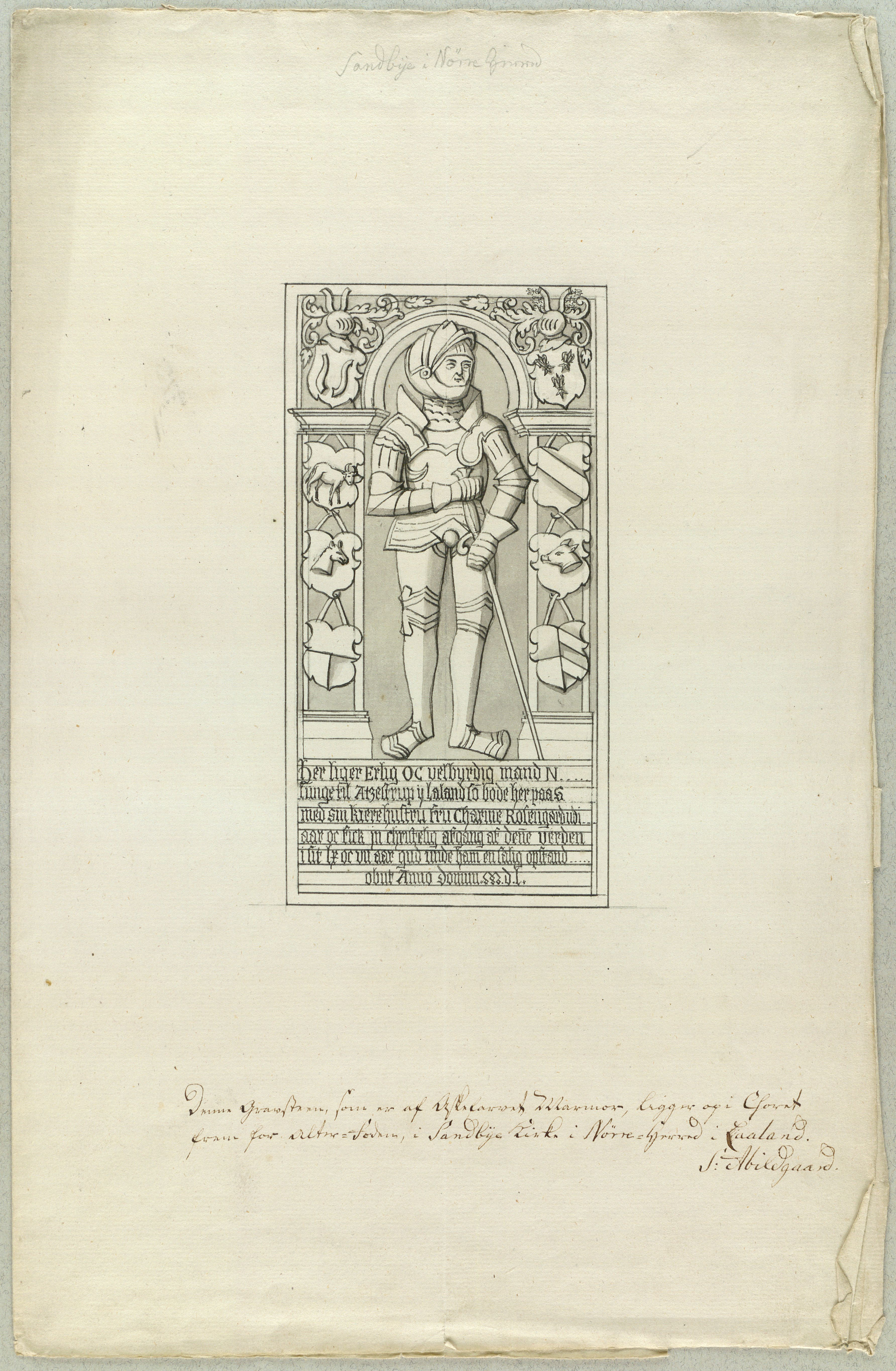
Drawing by Søren Abildgaard of Niels Lunde's ledgerstone in the chancel.

The auricular Baroque altarpiece (originally an epitaph) and the pulpit and canopy, both from c. 1635, are probably the work of Hans Gudewerth the Younger (died 1671). Both finely decorated pieces have been carved with unusual skill. The pulpit has images of the Fall, Noah's Ark, the Resurrection and the Ascension of Jesus. The granite font is Romanesque. There is a bell from the Middle Ages and one cast in 1567.

Late Gothic frescos have been uncovered on the segments of the sacristy vaults, probably representing the early fathers of the church. Pope Gregory with a green halo is depicted in the eastern segment while Jerome in his red cardinal's robes and hat can be seen in the northern segment.

== Surroundings ==
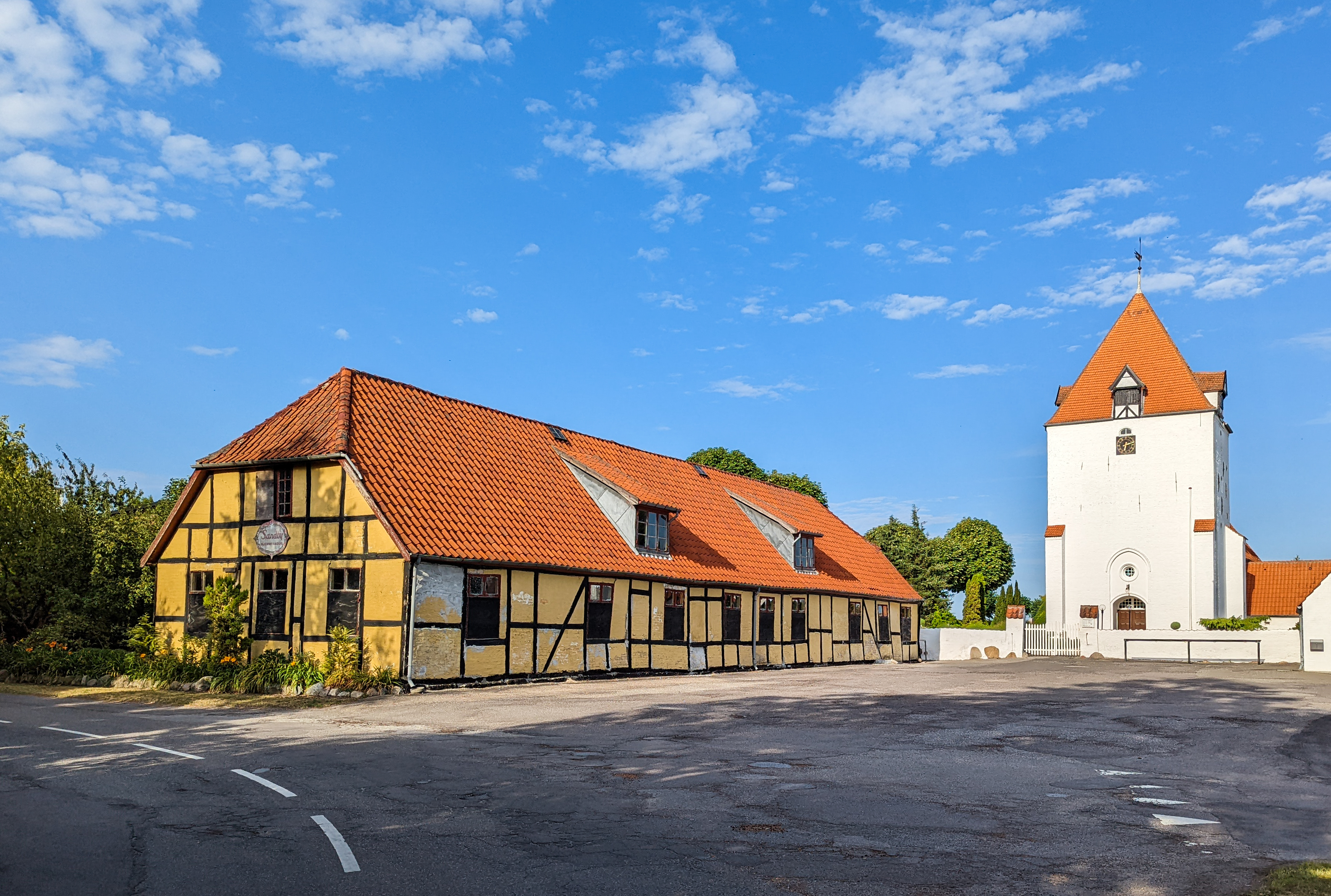
The rectory next to the church.

Next to the church is the old, half-timbered rectory.

== See also ==
- List of churches on Lolland
