= Nordlunde =

Coordinates: 54°53′N 11°14′E

Nordlunde is a hamlet on the island of Lolland, Denmark. It is about 7 kilometers from Nakskov, the main city of Lolland. Nordlunde has about 100 citizens. In the past, Nordlunde had a school, an inn, a small store, an agriculture factory and a smithy, it also had a telephone central and a mill at Moellevang. Currently the hamlet only contains a store of used goods. The small church (Danish: Nordlunde Kirke), without a tower, was built in the Middle Ages and contains a small graveyard.
