= Sophus Halle =

Danish composer

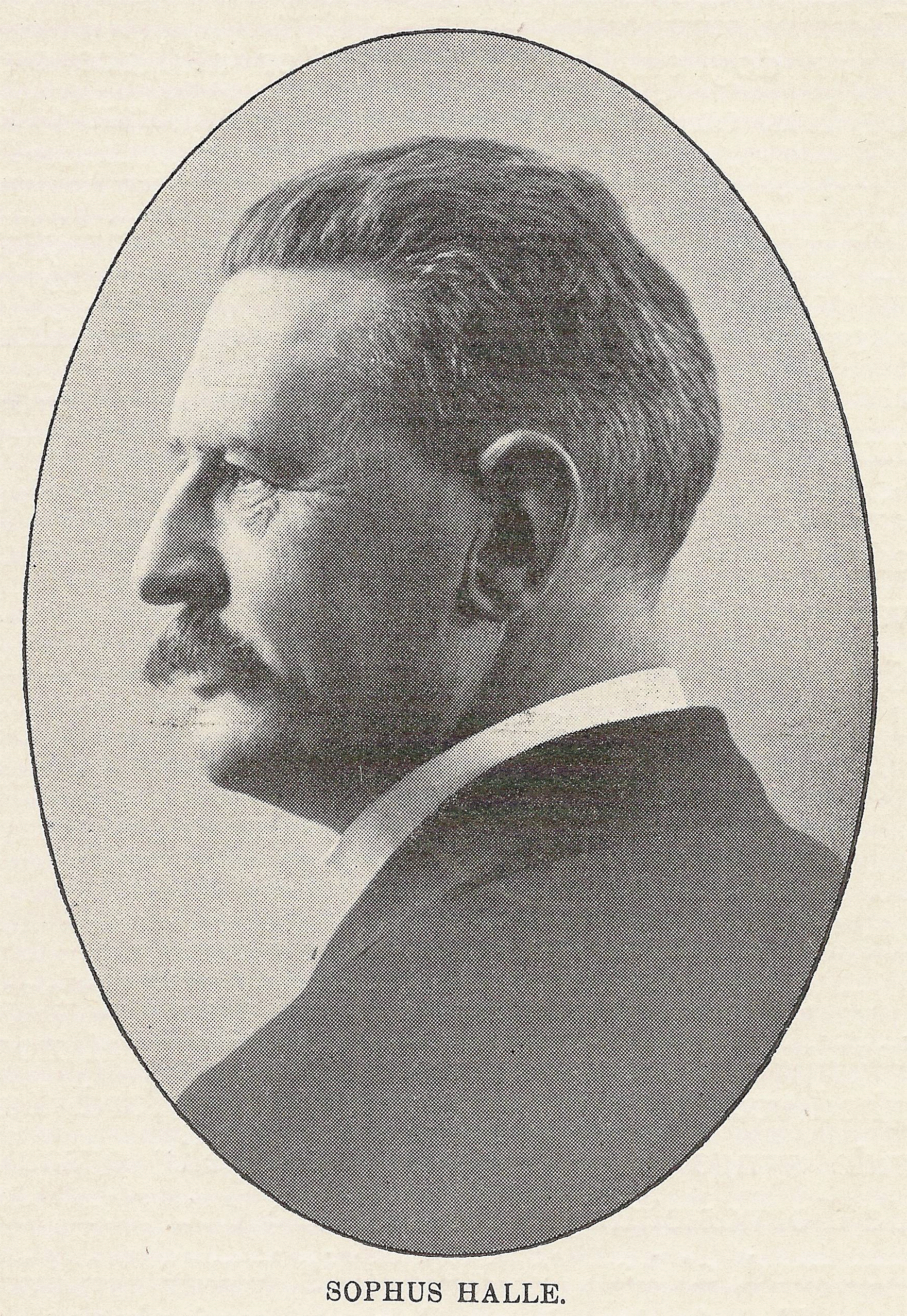

Sophus Halle (13 December 1862 – 1924) was a Danish teacher, organist and composer. He was born in Rødby and had no music lessons before he came to Jonstrup Seminarium in 1879 - 1882, where he was taught organ and music theory by Carl Mortensen. After being hired as a teacher in Copenhagen, he continued his organ practice and worked as a substitute organist in several churches. From 1896 he was hired as organist at the Immanuel Church until 1905 when he became school inspector at Hans Tavsensgades School and gave up the organist job.

In continuation of his duties, Halle was engaged in the folk song, i.a. as co-founder of the Danish Choral Association and as a member of a Singing Commission set up by the Copenhagen School Board.

His musical legacy consists of a number of choral songs, some collections of children's songs and several books of organ music for church services. In addition, he wrote various books on educational topics.

== See also ==
- List of Danish composers
