= Hillested =

- Village
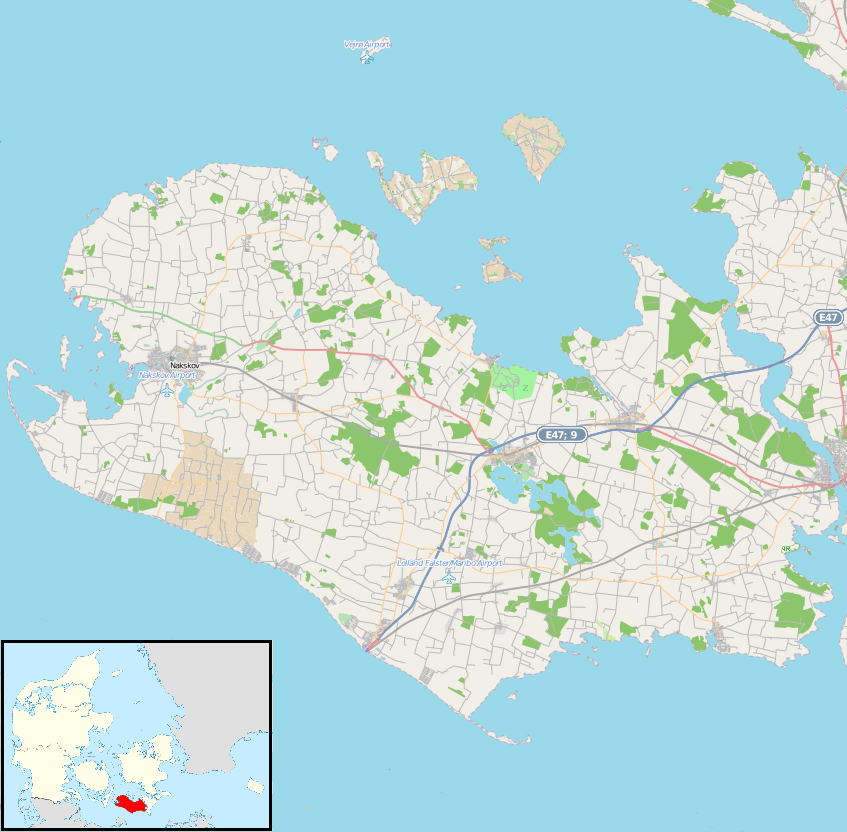
- The location of Hillested in Denmark Hillested (Denmark Region Zealand) Hillested (Denmark)
- Coordinates: 54°45′11″N 11°26′49″E
- Country: Denmark
- Region: Region Zealand
- Municipality: Lolland Municipality

Population (2026)
  - Total: 213
- Time zone: UTC+1 (CET)
  - Summer (DST): UTC+2 (CEST)

Hillested is a village located in the Lolland Municipality, in the Region Zealand of Denmark.
