= Juan Fugl =

Danish immigrant to Argentina

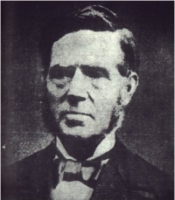
- Juan Fugl

Mayor of Tandil

Personal details
- Born: Hans Fugl; October 24, 1811 Horslunde, Denmark
- Died: January 25, 1900 Copenhagen, Denmark
- Spouse: Dorothea Larsen
- Occupation: Politician, teacher, carpenter

Juan Fugl (born Hans Fugl; October 24, 1811 – January 25, 1900) was one of the first Danish immigrants who settled in the Argentine city of Tandil, Buenos Aires. He also reached the position of mayor of Tandil.

His father was a farmer, so to help his family had to work as a child doing the same work on a ranch. After recovering from some diseases, he studied teaching at a seminar. With the aim to colonise new frontiers, he arrived in Argentina and settled in Tandil where he dedicated to teaching and agriculture, and where he also established the first school in the village and built the first bakery. In Tandil there is still the mill he built himself. He was mayor and justice of the peace, besides occupying other political posts.

On a trip to visit Denmark, he married a niece. He had eight children, one boy and seven girls, six of whom died at an early age. His son moved to Copenhagen to receive his secondary education there; this city was chosen by Fugl to spend there his last days of life.
