= Birket =

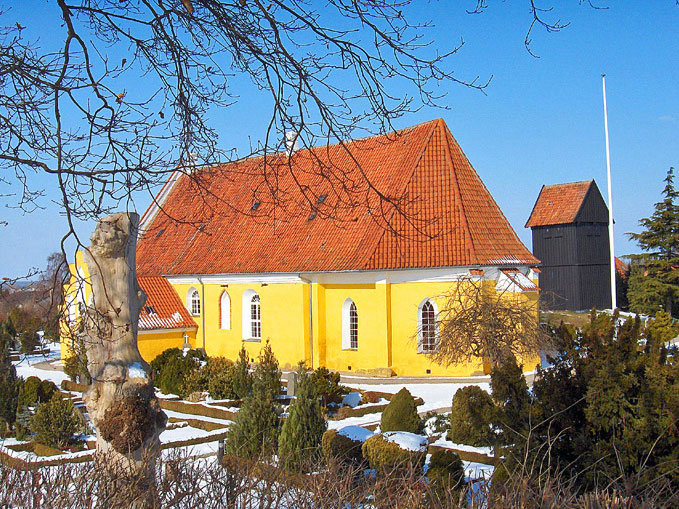
Church in Birket

Birket is a small town in Lolland Municipality, Denmark. It had a population of 214 residents in 2014. It is located 8 km east of Horslunde, 17 km northeast of Nakskov, 10 km northwest of Stokkemarke and 21 km northwest of Maribo.

Birket Church is located 1 km south of the town.
