= Sandby =

- Town
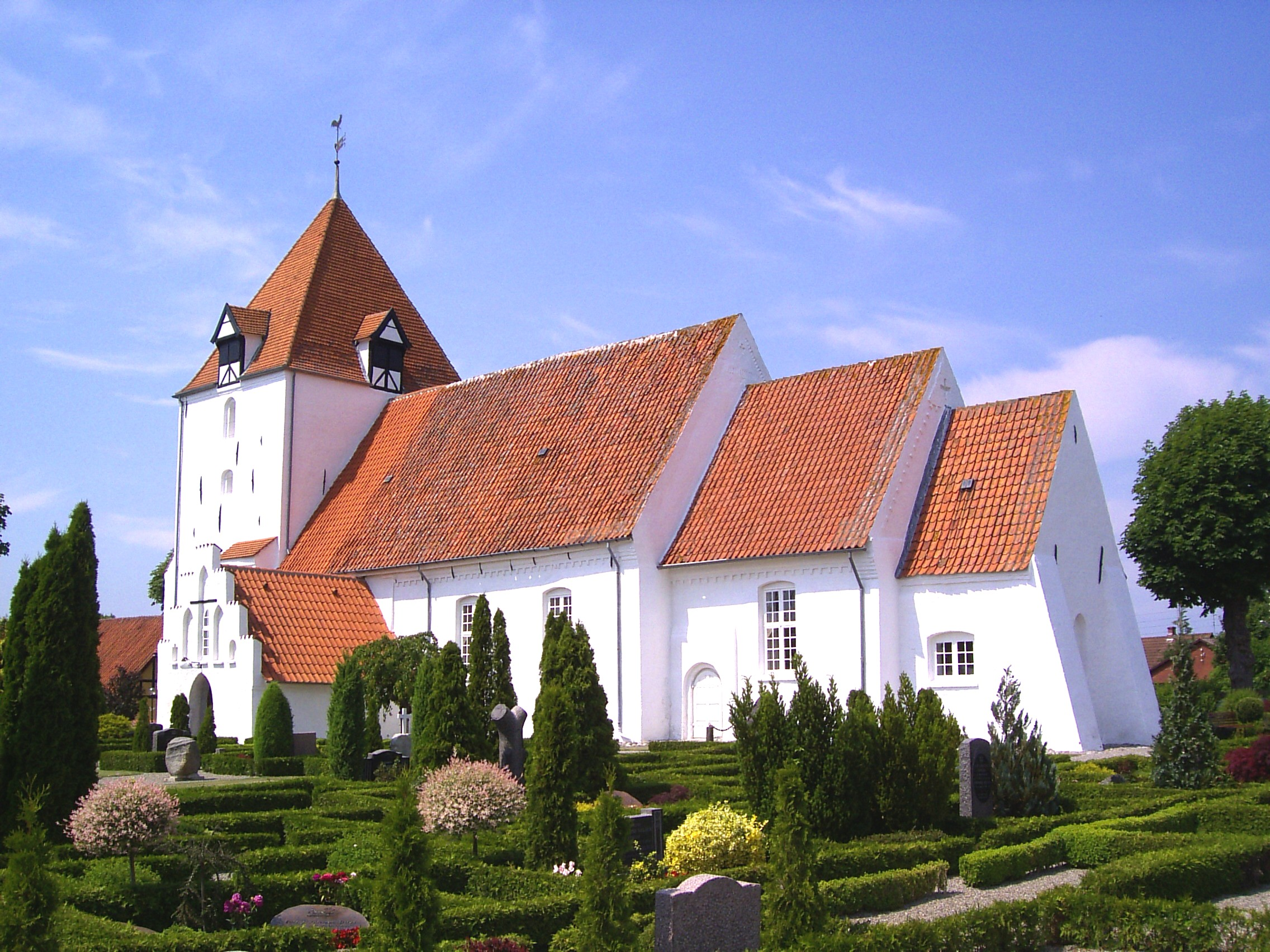
- Sandby Church

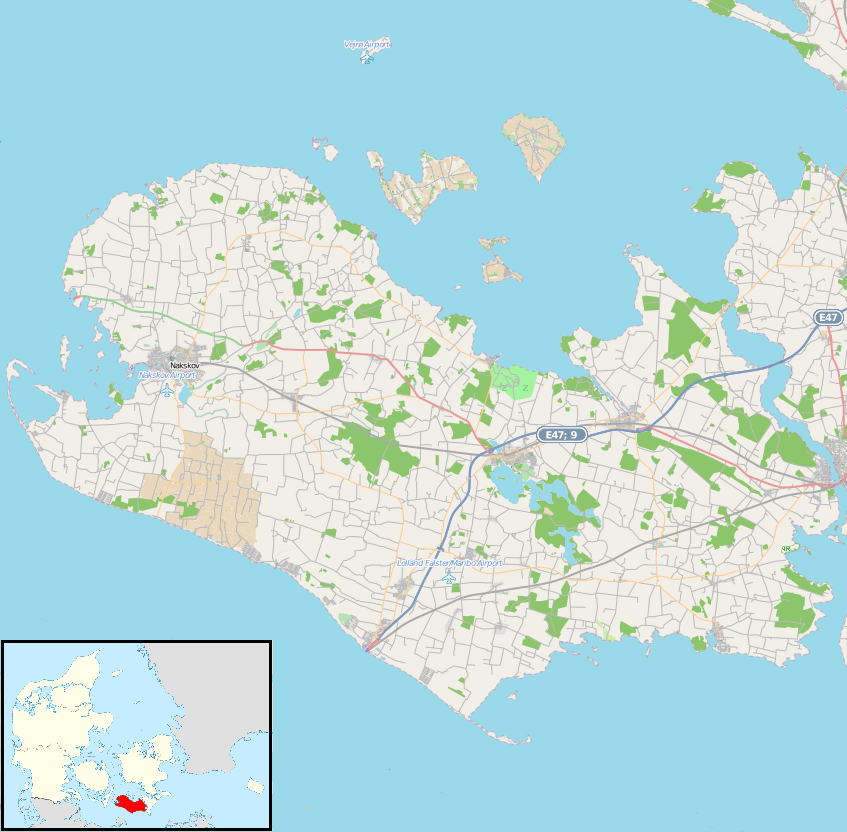
- Location on Lolland
- Coordinates: 54°52′34″N 11°5′19″E
- Country: Denmark
- Region: Zealand (Sjælland)
- Municipality: Lolland Municipality

Population (2026)
  - Total: 328
- Time zone: UTC+1 (CET)
  - Summer (DST): UTC+2 (CEST)

Sandby is a village located some 7 km (4.3 mi) northwest of Nakskov on the Danish island of Lolland. It belongs to Lolland Municipality in Region Sjælland. As of 2026, it has a population of 328.

== History ==
Sandby has a history going back to the 13th century. From 1915 to 1967, it had a station on the Nakskov-Kragenæs Railway called Harpelunde as there was already a Sandby Station in Odsherred. The northern and eastern parts of the village bear traces of their agricultural history while more recent developments can be seen around the church to the south.

== Landmarks ==
Dating from the middle of the 13th century, Sandby Church has a Romanesque chancel and nave and a Late Gothic tower. Its auricular Baroque altarpiece and pulpit and both from c. 1635, are remarkably well carved works probably by Hans Gudewerth the Younger.

The nearby Frederiksdal estate dates from the beginning of the 14th century. Today's manor house was completed in 1756 by Georg Dietrich Tschierske.

== Notable people ==
- August Winding (1835 in Tårs, near Sandby – 1899) was a Danish pianist, teacher and composer.
