= Horslunde =

- Town
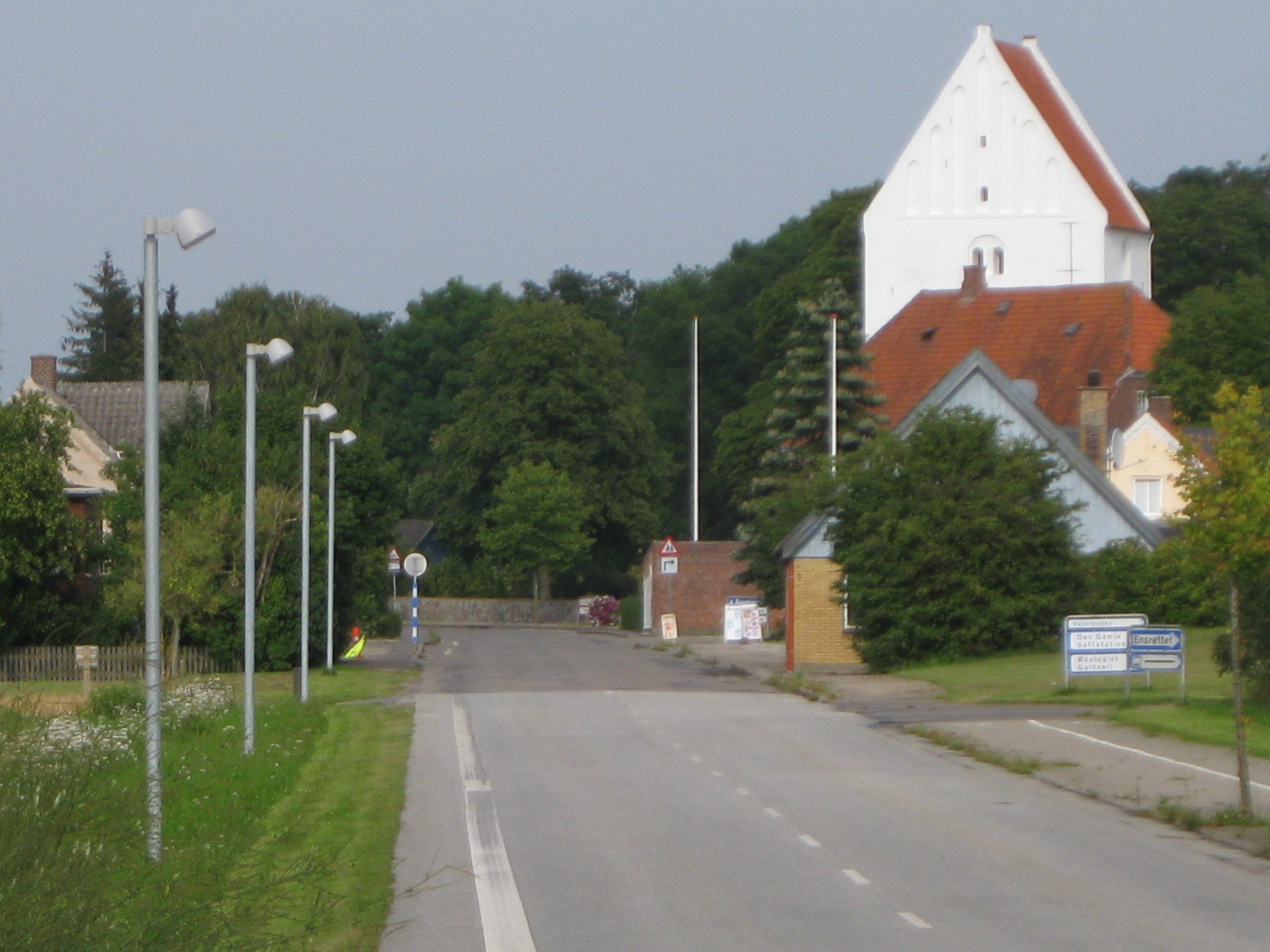
- Horslunde with a view of its church

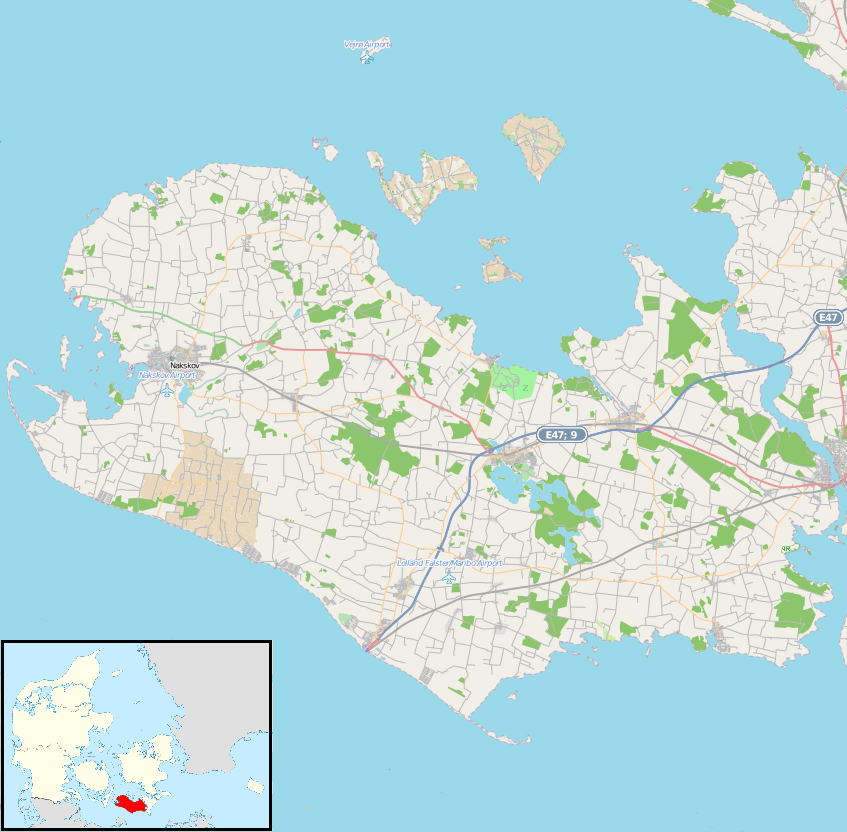
- Location on Lolland
- Coordinates: 54°54′31″N 11°12′59″E
- Country: Denmark
- Region: Zealand (Sjælland)
- Municipality: Lolland

Population (2026)
  - Total: 573
- Time zone: UTC+1 (CET)
  - Summer (DST): UTC+2 (CEST)
- Postal code: 4913

Horslunde is a village on the island of Lolland in south-eastern Denmark. In January 2026, it had a population of 573. Horslunde is located northeast of Nakskov, and 29 km northwest of the municipality seat Maribo. Formerly a part of Ravnsborg, it is now in Lolland Municipality and belongs to Region Zealand.

Sites of interest in Horslunde include Reventlow-Museet Pederstrup, Reventlow Asylum, and the town's three churches: Horslunde Church, Nøbbet Church, and Nordlunde Church.

== Facilities ==
In 2010, Horslunde was named "Village of the Year" by the National Association of Villages in Denmark. The jury emphasized that through popular commitment and community involvement, the town had managed to preserve a number of both public and private services. These include a daycare, kindergarten, elementary school, private school, youth club, sports hall, library, elderly center, bus terminal, music school, medical school, a pharmacy, post office, grocery shop, filling station, and bakery.

The town upholds traditions such as shrovetide, midsummer, harvest festivals, and Christmas trees, but has also created a new initiative it calls "Horslunde as an energy village", through which local craftsmen have carried out energy-saving work worth almost 8 million DKK, with support from Realdania and the state's initiative fund, as well as installing solar cells in the fields adjacent to the town.

The Nordvestskolen public school has a branch in Horslunde with 275 pupils in grades 0-9, as well as the Ravnekrogen after-school care centre. The town also previously featured Horslunde Realskole, a private school which taught pupils in grades 0-9. In January 2024, it was announced that the school would close in March, however, that same month the school declared bankruptcy and closed with immediate effect.

== Notable people ==
- Christian Ditlev, Count of Reventlow (1710–1775) a Danish Privy Councillor, nobleman and estate owner; buried in Horslunde church
- Christian Ditlev Frederik, Count of Reventlow (1748–1827) a Danish statesman and reformer; buried in Horslunde church
- Juan Fugl (1811 in Horslunde – 1900) an early Danish immigrant to Tandil in Argentina
- Rasmus Friis (born 1871 in Horslunde - date of death unknown) a sports shooter, competed at the 1912 Summer Olympics
