= Rødby =

- Town
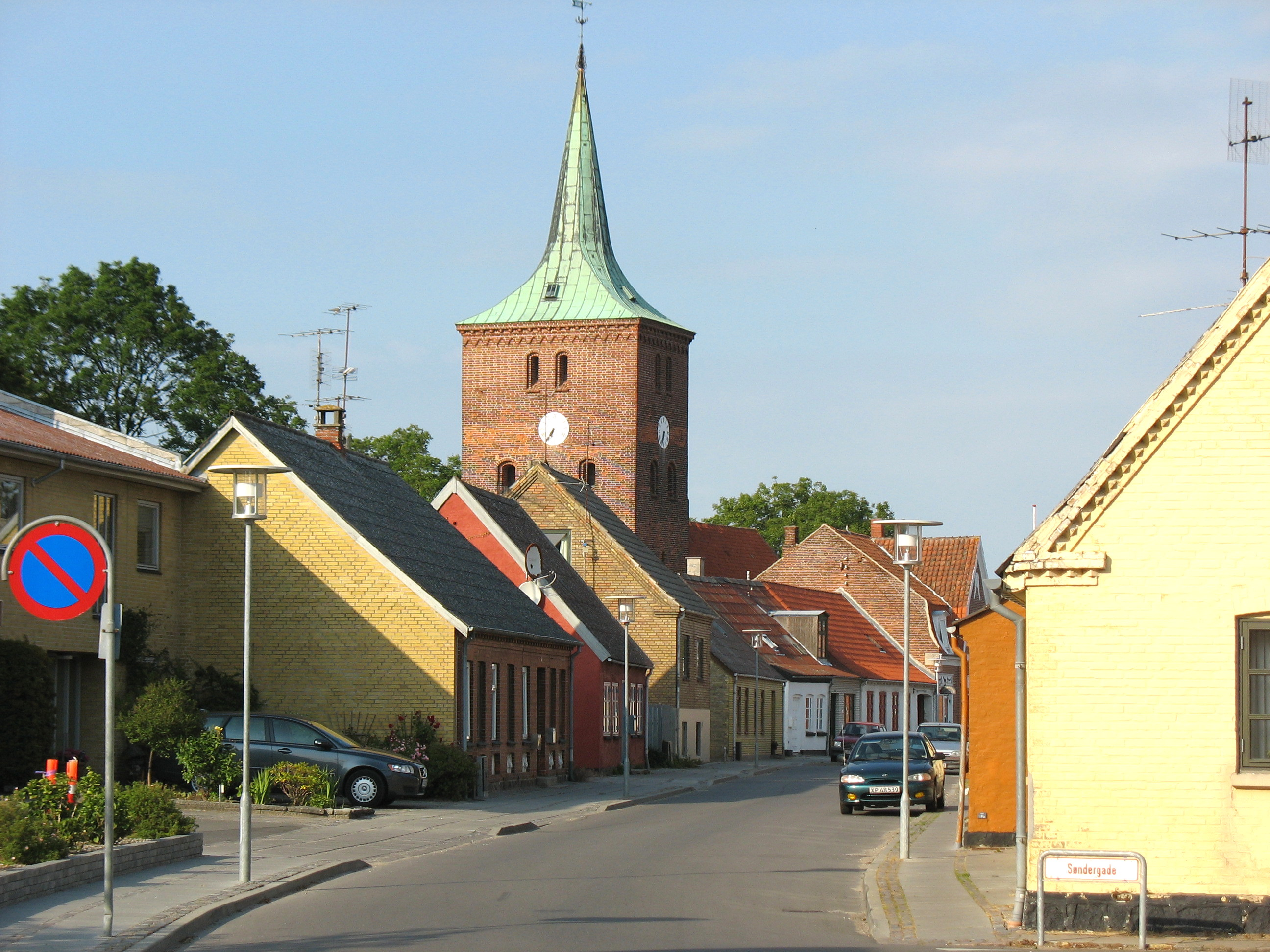
- The town centre of Rødby

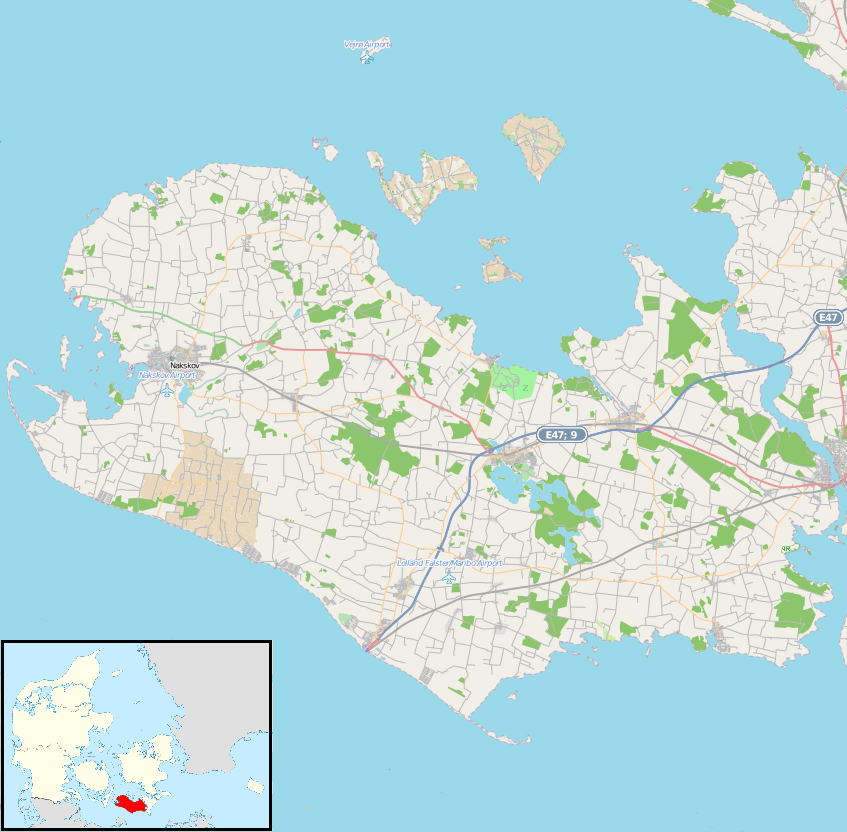
- Location on Lolland Rødby (Denmark Region Zealand) Rødby (Denmark)
- Coordinates: 54°41′37″N 11°23′18″E
- Country: Denmark
- Region: Region Zealand
- Municipality: Lolland Municipality

Area
  - Urban: 1.61 km^{2} (0.62 sq mi)

Population (2026)
  - Urban: 1,927
  - Urban density: 1,200/km^{2} (3,100/sq mi)
- Time zone: UTC+1 (CET)
  - Summer (DST): UTC+2 (CEST)
- Postal code: DK-4970 Rødby

Rødby is a town located on the island of Lolland in south Denmark. It has a population of 1,927 (1 January 2026). Until 2007, it was the seat of the former Rødby Municipality (Danish: kommune), and is now located in Lolland Municipality in Region Sjælland.

== History ==
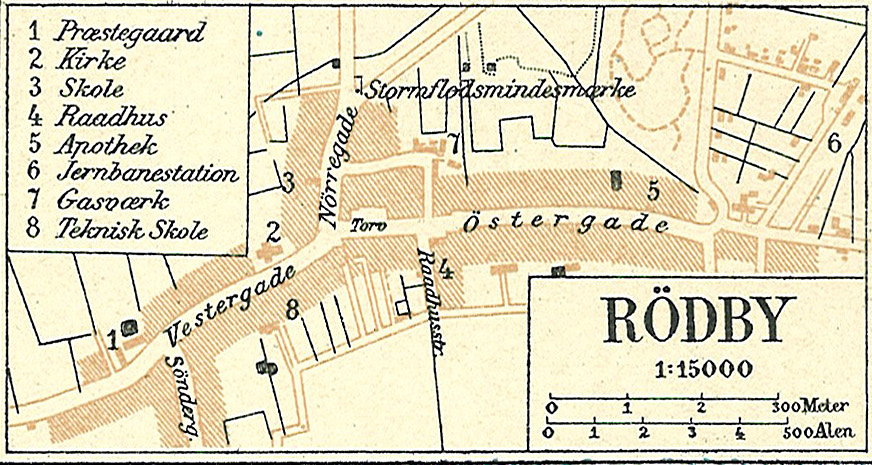
Historical map of Rødby, c. 1900

The town is mentioned for the first time as the village "Ruthby" in the Danish Census Book from 1231. In the first centuries, Rødby was a trading post and an important ferry point for Scandinavian travellers going to the Duchy of Holstein and to the central parts of Europe.

== Rødby Municipality ==
The former Rødby municipality covered an area of 120 km^{2}, and had a total population of 6,590 (2005). Its last mayor was Hans Ole Sørensen, a member of the Venstre (Liberal Party) political party.

On 1 January 2007 Rødby municipality ceased to exist as the result of Kommunalreformen ("The Municipality Reform" of 2007). It was merged with the existing Holeby, Højreby, Maribo, Nakskov, Ravnsborg, and Rudbjerg municipalities to form the new Lolland Municipality. This creates a municipality with an area of 892 km^{2} and a total resident population of 49,469 (2005). The new municipality is part of the Region Sjælland ("Zealand Region").

== The harbour at Rødbyhavn ==
Rødbyhavn ("Rødby Harbour") is located at the coast approximately 5 km southwest of the town of Rødby. Rødbyhavn is a ferry port and is the endpoint of the Danish section of the European route E47. This endpoint is signposted "Rødby" on road signs, which is the most well-known feature of Rødby.

== Notable people ==
- Emil Vett (1843 in Rødby – 1911) a Danish businessman who co-founded Magasin du Nord
- Gutte Eriksen (1918 in Rødby – 2008) a Danish ceramist whose works were influenced by time spent in Japan
- Knud Holscher (born 1930 in Rødby) a Danish architect and industrial designer
- Sophus Halle (1862 in Rødby – 1924) a Danish teacher, organist and composer
- Michael Damgaard (born 1990 in Rødby) a Danish handball player, 2016 Olympic Champion
