= Holeby =

- Town
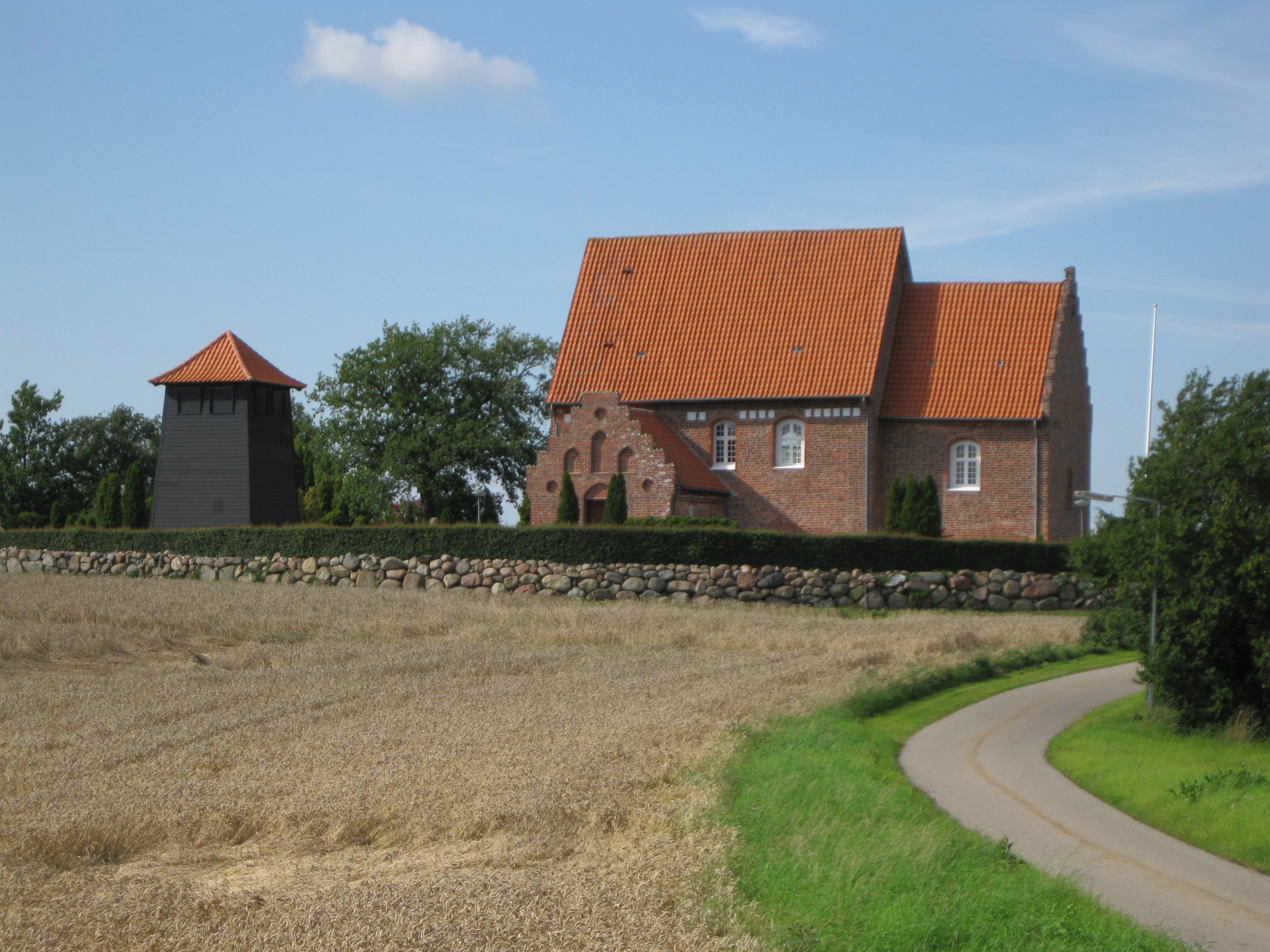
- Holeby Church

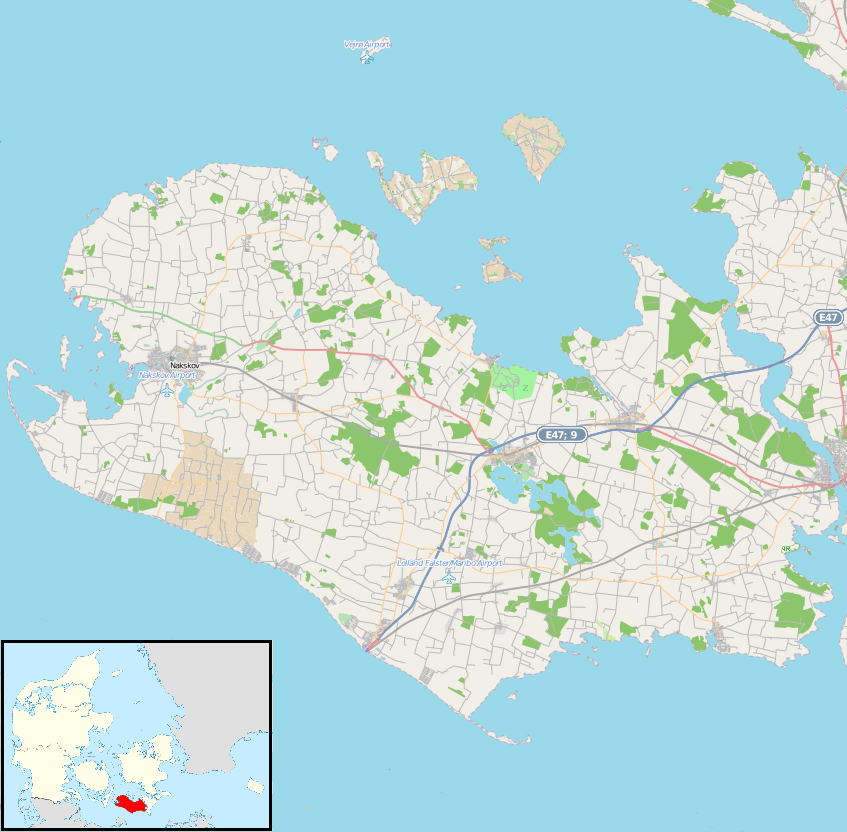
- Location within Lolland Location within Denmark Region Zealand Location within Denmark
- Coordinates: 54°42′46″N 11°27′29″E
- Country: Denmark
- Region: Region Zealand
- Municipality: Lolland Municipality

Area
  - Urban: 1.36 km^{2} (0.53 sq mi)

Population (2026)
  - Urban: 1,352
  - Urban density: 994/km^{2} (2,570/sq mi)
- Time zone: UTC+1 (CET)
  - Summer (DST): UTC+2 (CEST)
- Postal codes: DK-4960 Holeby

Holeby is a small town in Lolland Municipality, in Region Zealand, Denmark. It was the seat of Holeby Municipality. Holeby is located 6 kilometers north of the planned Rødby railway station, set to open in 2032 on the line to Germany via the Fehmarn Belt Fixed Link.

== Notable people ==
- Erhard Frederiksen (1843-1903) a Danish agronomist and sugar manufacturer; he co-founded a sugar factory at Holeby in 1872-74
- Ole Søltoft (1941–1999) a Danish actor, an icon of the 1970s wave of Danish erotic feature film comedies; he grew up in Holeby
