= Lolland Municipality =

Lolland Municipality Lolland Kommune (Danish)
- Municipality
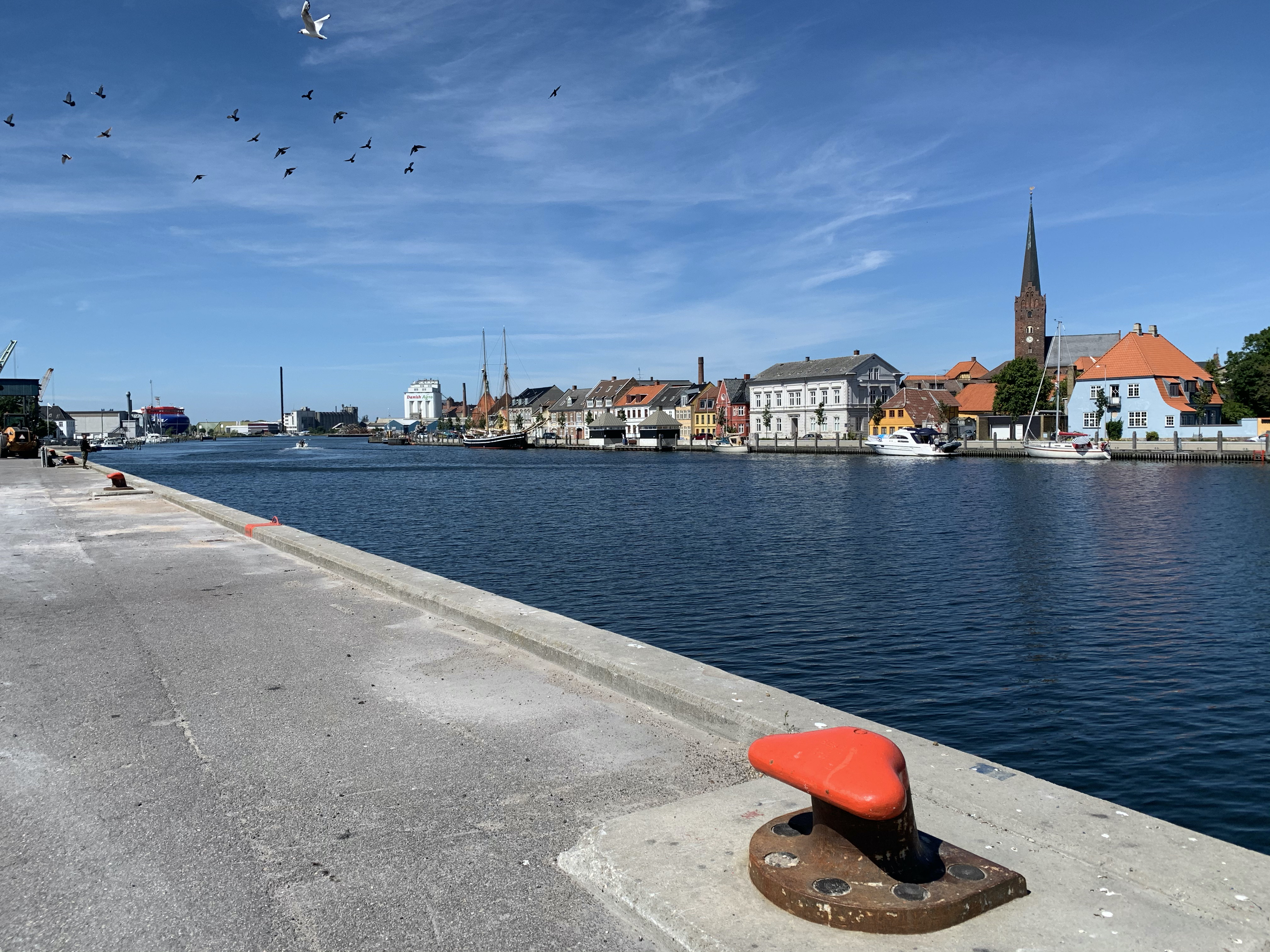

- Flag Coat of arms

- Location in Denmark
- Coordinates: 54°46′10″N 11°25′28″E
- Country: Denmark
- Region: Zealand
- Seat: Maribo

Government
  - Mayor: Holger Schou Rasmussen (S)

Area
  - Total: 885.40 km^{2} (341.85 sq mi)

Population (1 January 2026)
  - Total: 38,533
  - Density: 43.520/km^{2} (112.72/sq mi)
- Time zone: UTC+1 (CET)
  - Summer (DST): UTC+2 (CEST)
- Municipal code: 360
- Website: www.lolland.dk

Church of Denmark parishes in Lolland Municipality. Map does not reflect the current number of parishes, as parishes have been, and will be, merged because of dwindling population numbers.

Lolland Municipality (Danish: Lolland Kommune) is a kommune on the island of Lolland in the Region Sjælland of Denmark. According to Municipal And Regional Key Figures (www.noegletal.dk) it covers a total area of 885.40 km^{2} (341.85 square miles) and has a population of 38,533 (1 January 2026; 44.80 inh./km^{2}/116.03/sq.mi.). The western part of Guldborgsund Municipality, the southernmost in Denmark, occupies the eastern part of the island (Østlolland).

The city hall and the seat of the mayor of Lolland municipality is in Maribo while the largest town is Nakskov. There are 25 members from 1 January 2018 - a reduction from 31 members - of the municipal council. The current mayor is a Social Democrat.

On Monday 1 January 2007 Lolland municipality was created as the result of Kommunalreformen ("The Municipal Reform" of 2007), covering the former municipalities of Holeby, Højreby, Maribo, Nakskov, Ravnsborg, Rudbjerg and Rødby. The local politicians' original plan was to create two new municipalities: Maribo Kommune (Midtlolland: middle of the island:Holeby, Højreby, Maribo, Rødby) and: Nakskov Kommune (Vestlolland: western part of the island:Nakskov, Rudbjerg, Ravnsborg), but in a local referendum Wednesday 18 May 2005 it was decided by the voters to combine all of the 7 municipalities into one (the results were 51.6% for in Midtlolland and 54.6% for in Vestlolland). This is on par with Sønderborg Municipality, which also is made up of 7 old municipalities, which is the highest among the new municipalities.

== Politics ==
=== Municipal council ===
Lolland's municipal council consists of 25 members as of January 2018, elected every four years. Below are the municipal councils elected since the Municipal Reform of 2007 which was made into law on 26 June 2005 before the elections to the municipal councils including councils in the 67 new municipalities of which 66 functioned as merger committees during 2006. The new Ærø Municipality was allowed by the government to commence work from 1 January 2006. Bornholm Regional Municipality was created on 1 January 2003.

Election	Party									Total seats	Turnout	Elected mayor
Election	A	C	F	L	L	O	P	V	Ø	Total seats	Turnout	Elected mayor
2005	10	1	9	1		2		8		31	72.6%	Stig Vestergaard (A)
2009	11	3	9			3		5		31	64.4%	Stig Vestergaard (A)
2013	9	3	3		1	4		9	2	31	73.4%	Holger S. Rasmussen (A)
2017	11		1		2	3	2	5	1	25	68.6%	Holger S. Rasmussen (A)
2021	12	1	1		1	2	2	5	1	25	63.05%	Holger S. Rasmussen (A)
Data from Kmdvalg.dk 2005, 2009, 2013 and 2017

== Economy ==
Lolland municipality is a countryside municipality largely dependent on its agricultural industry featuring an open and intensively farmed landscape. The island has been renowned for its large sugar beet production. Despite the official vision of creating an ecologically sustainable economy agriculture is mainly conventional and focusing on cash crops like wheat, sugar beets, rapeseed and an intensive production. The sugar beets are refined in up to date processing facilities owned by Nordzucker in Nakskov, the main industrial center. Nordzucker also has a sugar processing factory in Nykøbing Falster in neighbouring Guldborgsund Municipality.

The focus on green technologies has resulted in another landscape feature, the many windmills dotting the island.

The shipyard Nakskov Skibsværft founded in 1916 by East Asiatic Company's H. N. Andersen, who was born in Nakskov, was the largest single workplace in the area with 1,500 employees (1966:2,200 employees). It closed on 1 January 1987. In the heavy industry other large industrial production sites within the municipality have concentrated their efforts on specialised parts of the production, design for instance, but all factory jobs - the majority of the jobs - have been lost, i.e. MAN B&W Diesel A/S (founded as Holeby Dieselmotorfabrik A/S in 1919) in Holeby. What remains is light industry. Among the manufactured products are: medical devices made of plastic, breakfast cereals for private label companies.

Major companies having production facilities in Lolland Municipality include Codan Medical in Rødby. Its headquarters are in neighbouring Guldborgsund Municipality.

== Demography ==
In the census taken (date?) 1965 (not based on a computerised digital register) the municipalities within the area covering the present municipality had 61,879 inhabitants, and 1 January 1985 (registerbased) 55,897 inhabitants. In 2013 alone, population numbers fell by 2.043% (908 people), from 44,436 to 43,528 inhabitants. From 1965 to 1 December 2023, this represents a fall of 22,213 in the population number, which comes to 35.89%. The area given for the former municipalities is in square kilometers, and then in square miles: Nakskov municipality (area:32.67;12.61 square miles) alone had 17,390 inhabitants in 1965 (1998:15,549;2002: 15,152) and Maribo (area:154.02;59.46 square miles), the second most populous municipality in 1965 in the area had 12,517 (1998:11,280;2002:11,039), Ravnsborg (197.59;76.28 sq mi) had 8,708 (1999:5,780;2002: 5,677), Rødby (120.37;46.47 sq mi) 8,198 (1999: 6,809;2002:6,763), Højreby (127.79;49.33 sq mi) 5,114 (1997:4,257;2002:4,175), Holeby (116.07;44.81 sq mi) 4,993 (1996:4,269;2002:4,149), and Rudbjerg (143.41; 55.37 sq mi) 4,959 (1999:3,584;2002:3,564) inhabitants.

Towns (1 January 2023):

Nakskov	12,456
Maribo	5,734
Rødby	1,936
Rødbyhavn	1,549
Holeby	1,399
Søllested	1,363
Horslunde	611
Nørreballe	478
Bandholm	457
Dannemare	391

Towns in Lolland Municipality with population numbers. This is the contiguously built-up area, not to be confused with the previous municipalities with the same names that were made up of several whole parishes, including rural areas. Nakskov town (built-up area) had 16,935 inhabitants in 1960.

The Church of Denmark has around 50 parishes in the municipality as of August 2023.

=== Births and deaths ===
Births:413 (2006);400 (2007);376 (2008);377 (2009);375 (2010);331 (2011);324 (2012);286 (2013);309 (2014);293 (2015);270 (2016);309 (2017);292 (2018);290 (2019);215 (2020);285 (2021);254 (2022);259 (2023)

Deaths:822 (2006);759 (2007);754 (2008);755 (2009);756 (2010);711 (2011);651 (2012);739 (2013);677 (2014);675 (2015);671 (2016);667 (2017);698 (2018);694 (2019);685 (2020);700 (2021);725 (2022);661 (2023)

Births - deaths:-409 (2006);-359 (2007);-378 (2008);-378 (2009);-381 (2010);-380 (2011);-327 (2012);-453 (2013);-368 (2014);-382 (2015);-401 (2016);-358 (2017);-406 (2018);-404 (2019);-470 (2020);-415 (2021);-471 (2022);-402 (2023)

Source:Statistikbanken.dk/Befolkning og valg/(table)FODIE (births);FOD207 (deaths);BEV107 (births;deaths;birth surplus).

== Transport ==
The municipalities of Lolland and Bornholm and the archipelago of Ertholmene northeast of Bornholm are the places in eastern Denmark that are located the farthest from the capital and largest city of Denmark, Copenhagen. Although the transport to Copenhagen from Lolland can be undertaken by road and railway, Lolland from a point of view of transport can be seen as lying on a dead end (Danish: blind vej;blindgyde) - at least the western part. For most people having visited or visiting Germany on the other side of Fehmarn Belt, Lolland is just a drive-by place along the motorway route.

The railway passenger service in the municipality is operated by the railway company Lokaltog, subsidized by the central government through Movia, which is a part owner of the train company.

A ferry route connects Lolland with Langeland to the west.

=== Fehmarn Belt Fixed Link ===
The traffic corridor between Hamburg and Copenhagen is linked via car and train ferries sailing between Rødby and Puttgarden two times an hour. This ferry route will have competition from the Fehmarn Belt Fixed Link road and railway tunnel which is scheduled to be finished in 2026 and to open in 2031. The tunnel will be located in a corridor traversing Fehmarn Belt between a location (exits and entrances of the tunnel) east of the port of Rødbyhavn and a location (exits and entrances) east of the port of Puttgarden. When the tunnel is finished, Rødbyhavn will not have a train station. It will be located near Holeby instead, which is 10 kilometers inland. This is because the location of the tunnel changes the route of the railway and road in such a way that it will be impossible to relocate the train station from its present place to another place inside the town of Rødbyhavn itself.

== See also ==
- Danisco
