= Lolland =

Island of Denmark

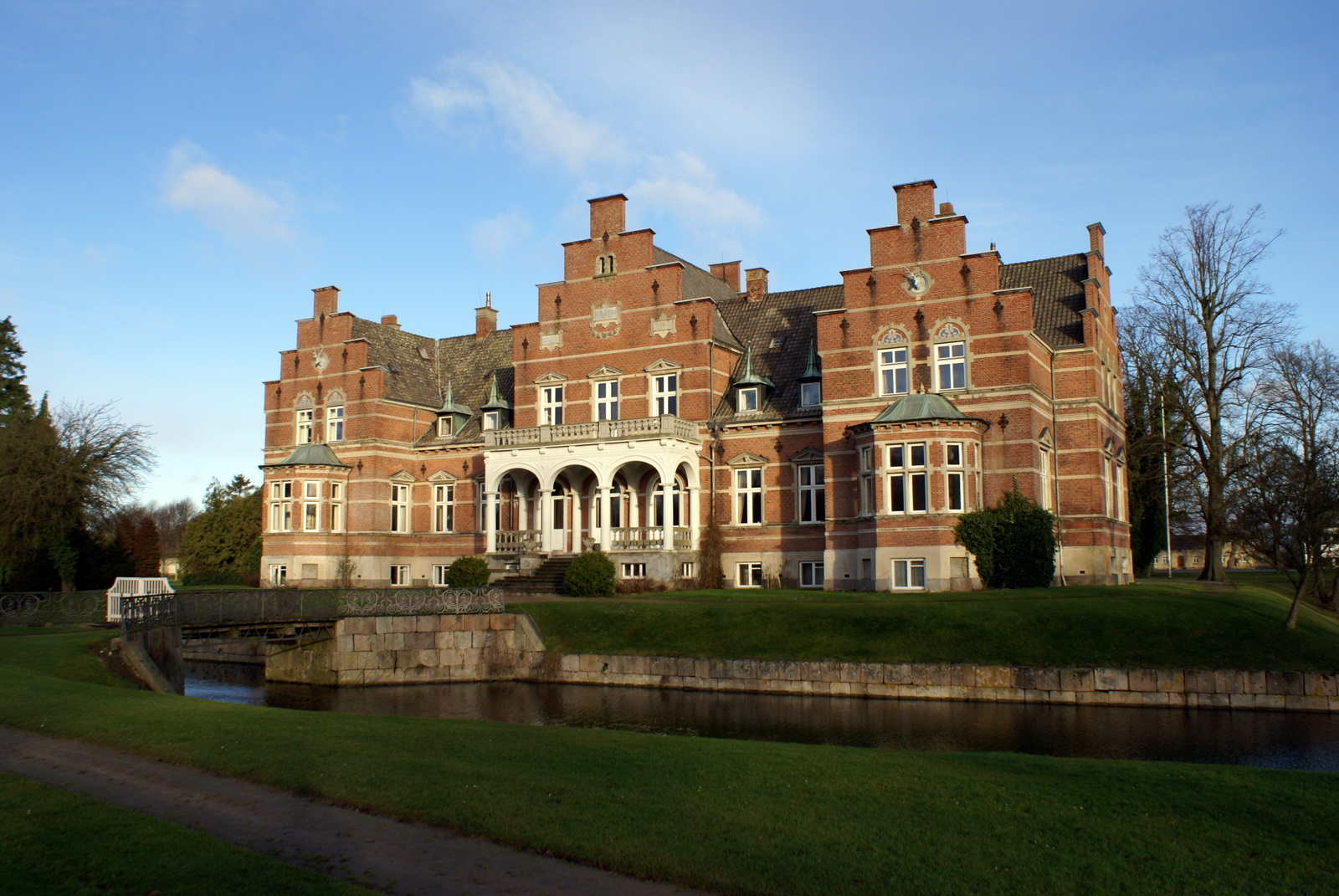
- Fuglsang Manor, now a major cultural centre on the island

Geography
- Location: Kattegat, Belts and Sund
- Coordinates: 54°46′10″N 11°25′28″E
- Area: 1,243 km^{2} (480 sq mi)

Administration
- Denmark
- Region: Region Zealand
- Municipality: Lolland Municipality, Guldborgsund Municipality
- Largest settlement: Nakskov (pop. 12,661 (2018))

Demographics
- Population: 57,618 (2022)
- Pop. density: 46.35/km^{2} (120.05/sq mi)

Lolland (Danish: [ˈlʌˌlænˀ]; formerly spelled Laaland, literally "low land") is the fourth largest island of Denmark, with an area of 1,243 km^{2} (480 sq mi). Located in the Kattegat, Belts and Sund area, it is part of Region Sjælland (Region Zealand). As of 1 January 2022, it has 57,618 inhabitants. Lolland is closely connected to the island of Falster to its east. The locality of Sundby forms a cross-island urban area with Nykøbing Falster, the largest conurbation partially on Lolland. The most populated settlement on Lolland proper is Nakskov.

== Overview ==
Lolland is also known as the "pancake island" because of its flatness: the highest point of the entire island is 25 m (82 ft) above sea level, just outside the village of Horslunde. The island has been an important communication highway, among others for Nazi Germany during World War II. Historically, sugar beet has been grown in Lolland. Sugar is still a major industry, visible from the large number of sugar beet fields.

The largest town of Lolland is Nakskov, with 12,600 residents. Other main towns are Maribo (6,000 residents), which hosts the seat of the Diocese of Lolland-Falster, Sakskøbing (3,500 residents) and Rødby (2,500 residents).

Since January 1, 2007, Lolland has been administered by two municipalities, Lolland covering the western two thirds, and Guldborgsund uniting the eastern third with the neighbouring island Falster.

Lolland has motor and railway links both to the island of Falster to the east and to Germany (the German island Fehmarn, linked to the mainland) via ferry. European route E47 links Copenhagen to Hamburg (Germany) via Lolland.

== Transport ==
Route E47 from Copenhagen crosses the Guldborgsund strait between Lolland and Falster via a modern tunnel, but the motorway currently terminates at Rødbyhavn where a ferry carries vehicles to Fehmarn. Trains formerly used this ferry as well as part of the Vogelfluglinie. During construction of the Fehmarn Belt Fixed Link however, they currently take the longer way to the mainland via the Great Belt Bridge, then Funen and Jutland.

An immersed tunnel linking Lolland with Fehmarn, the Fehmarn Belt Fixed Link, was approved for construction in 2020, and is currently expected to by completed in 2031.

Two older bridges also span the strait between Lolland and Falster, the Frederick IX Bridge and Guldborgsund Bridge at the northern end of the strait. Frederick IX bridge is the railway bridge to Falster.

== Demography ==
Historical population

Year	Pop.	±%
1901	68,331	—
1906	69,738	+2.1%
1911	74,063	+6.2%
1916	78,193	+5.6%
1921	83,188	+6.4%
1925	86,544	+4.0%
1930	87,534	+1.1%
1935	85,607	−2.2%
1940	86,307	+0.8%

Year	Pop.	±%
1945	87,230	+1.1%
1950	86,490	−0.8%
1955	84,781	−2.0%
1960	83,170	−1.9%
1965	81,760	−1.7%
1970	78,934	−3.5%
1976	77,958	−1.2%
1981	77,431	−0.7%
1986	75,278	−2.8%

Year	Pop.	±%
1990	73,191	−2.8%
1995	71,610	−2.2%
2000	70,640	−1.4%
2005	68,751	−2.7%
2010	65,764	−4.3%
2015	60,896	−7.4%
2022	57,618	−5.4%

== Towns and villages ==
Populations at 1 January 2014

Nakskov	12,866
Maribo	5,933
Sakskøbing	4.539
Sundby	2.847
Rødby	2,092
Rødbyhavn	1,634
Søllested	1,458
Holeby	1,423

Nysted	1,336
Bandholm	678
Horslunde	671
Toreby	628
Guldborg	572
Kettinge	539
Nørreballe	532
Nagelsti	497

Stokkemarke	440
Dannemare	434
Hunseby	418
Sandby	386
Grænge	380
Langø, Lolland	319
Errindlev	298
Hillested	284

Ullerslev	276
Frejlev	264
Øster Ulslev	252
Branderslev	229
Radsted	215
Birket	214
Nordlunde	100

== Attractions ==
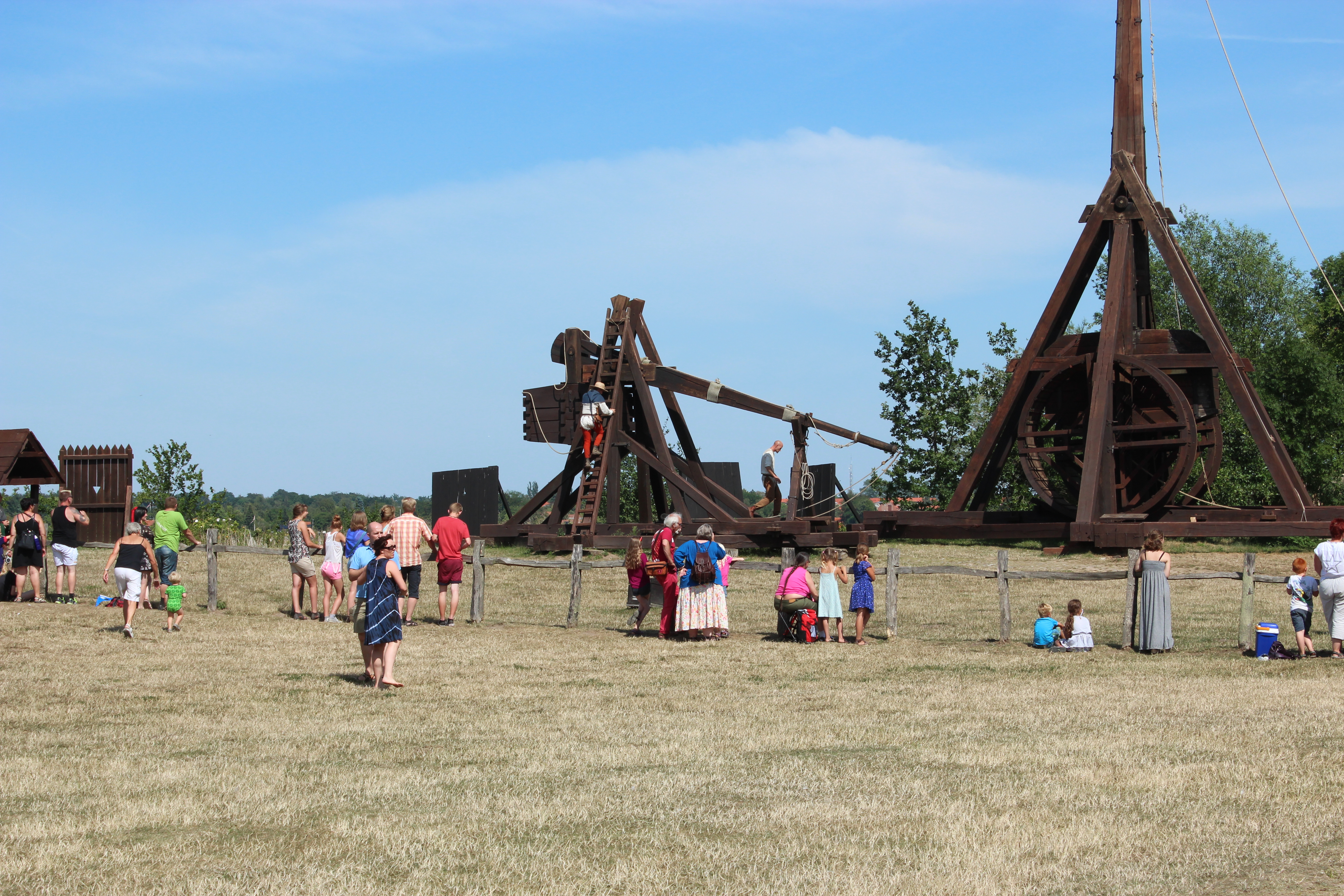
Trebuchet ready for firing at Middelaldercentret.

Among the attractions of the island are the 19th century Fuglsang Manor, and the neighbouring Fuglsang Art Museum, which opened in 2008. Knuthenborg Safari Park north of Maribo is the largest safari park in Northern Europe and the holiday resort Lalandia is a giant indoor water park. Furthermore, Middelaldercentret is an open-air museum on the easternmost part of the island, just outside Nykøbing Falster. The Centre is an experimental living history museum and it contains a reconstructed part of a medieval town from around 1400. It is among the most authentic reconstructions of the medieval period in Europe, and holds both the largest and the oldest trebuchets in the world.

Lolland has many sandy beaches and areas with summer houses, which are primarily visited by German tourists.

== See also ==
- List of Danish islands
- Nearby islands: Falster, Fejø, Femø, Askø, Vejrø.
- Lolland Hydrogen Community
- Hoby treasure
