= Y-train =

Series of diesel multiple units

Duewag Y
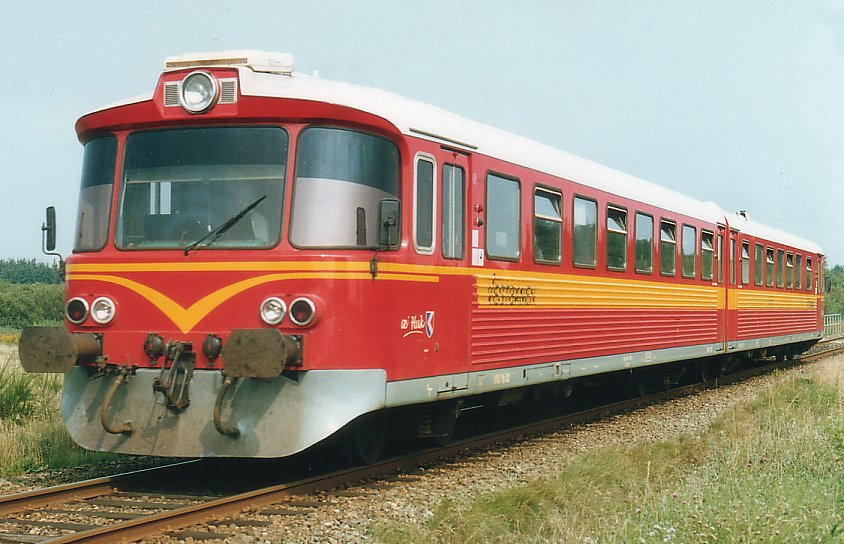
- Y-type trainset in Vestbanen livery
- Stock type: diesel multiple unit
- Manufacturer: Waggonfabrik Uerdingen
- Assembly: West Germany
- Constructed: 1965–1988
- Number built: 160
- Capacity: 327

Specifications
- Train length: 52,500 mm (172 ft 3 in)
- Width: 3,020 mm (119 in)
- Height: 3,550 mm (140 in)
- Wheel diameter: 760 mm (30 in)
- Maximum speed: 80 km/h (50 mph)
- Weight: 63,000 kg (139,000 lb)
- Engine type: Daimler-Benz; OM407h
- Transmission: hydraulic-mechanical
- AAR wheel arrangement: (1A)'(A1)'+2'2'+2'2'
- Braking system(s): air

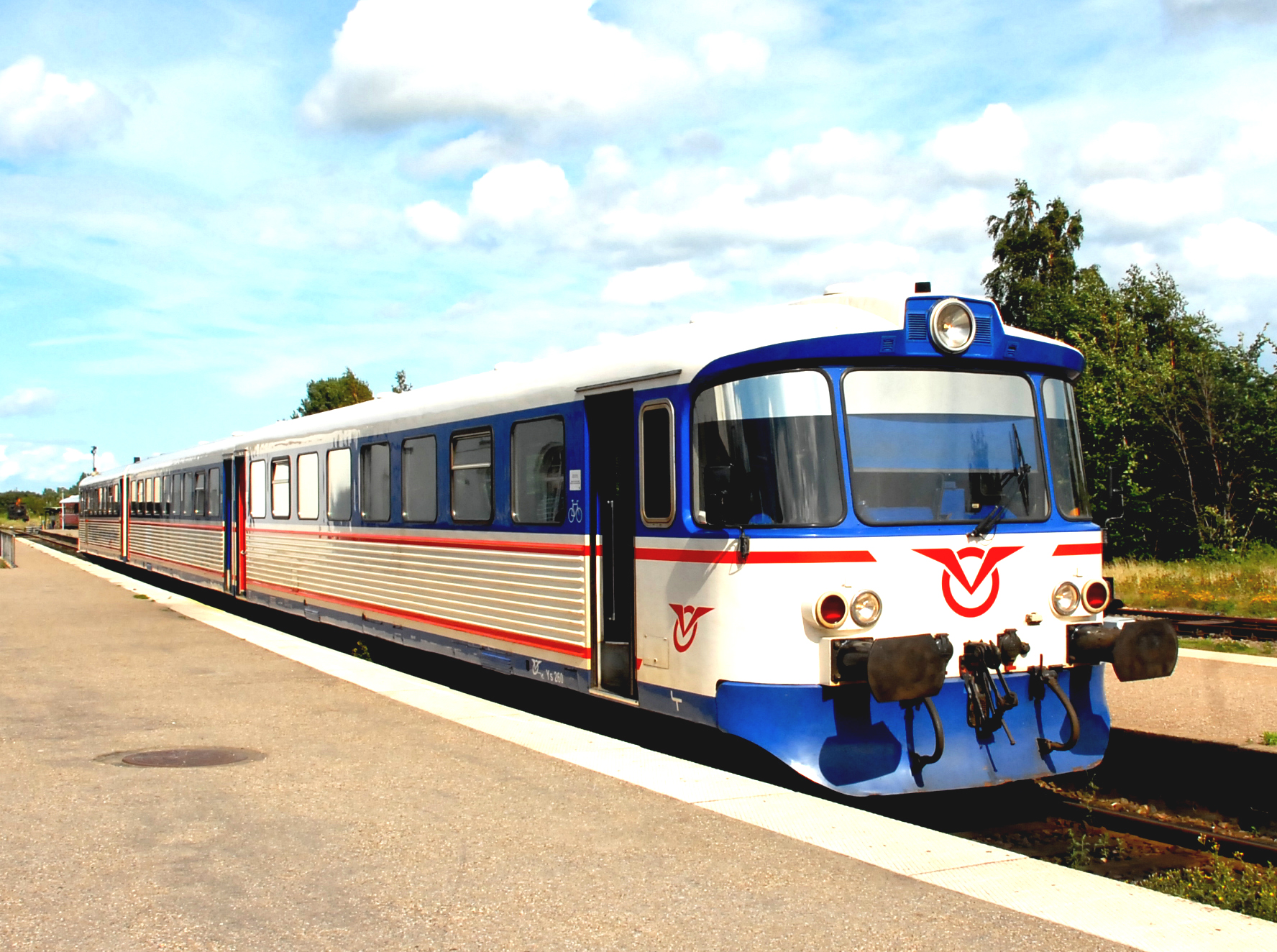
Unit in Vestsjællands Lokalbaner livery (2007)

The Duewag Y is a series of diesel multiple units (DMUs) manufactured between 1965 and 1988 for Danish rail operators by the West German company Waggonfabrik Uerdingen. A total of 160 cars were built: 76 motor cars, 23 trailer cars, and 61 control cars.

Introduced in 1965 by Danish private operators and later in 1984 by DSB, the Y-type units began being phased out in the 1990s. DSB ceased operations in 2010, and the last run on Danish rails, by a private operator, occurred in 2012. All units were scrapped except one preserved for museum purposes and another exported to Poland in 2008. In 2010, this unit operated in Kuyavian-Pomeranian Voivodeship under Arriva RP, but it was later placed in long-term reserve with no plans for reactivation.

== History ==
In the 1960s, Danish private rail operators began retiring steam locomotives on local lines, seeking diesel replacements to cut costs. A consortium of private rail companies agreed to jointly fund a bulk order. After testing various models, they selected Waggonfabrik Uerdingen in West Germany for its superior offer.

Between 1965 and 1988, 160 Y-type cars – 76 motor cars, 23 trailers, and 61 control cars, including 9 motor and 5 control cars with dual cabs – were delivered in eight batches to 14 private operators and DSB. Production occurred at Düwag's Krefeld plant, with final assembly by Scandia in Randers.

Designated Y to denote private operator stock, the units earned the nickname lynette (Danish: little lightning) in colloquial use.

== Design ==
The Y-type DMUs consist of motor cars (Ym, Danish: motorvogn), intermediate trailer cars (Yp, mellemvogn), and control cars (Ys, styrevogn). Configurations range from two to seven cars, with up to five trailers between two cab-equipped cars (at least one motor car). Common setups include two-car (Ym+Ys) and three-car (Ym+Yp+Ys) units.

=== Body ===
The cars feature self-supporting steel bodies with welded rolled and bent profile frames. Exterior walls have ribbed steel panels below windows, with steel sheet roofs and corrugated steel floors spot-welded to the frame. Mineral wool fills the space between steel and wooden floors, while mineral and glass wool mats insulate walls and roofs for thermal and acoustic protection.

=== Interior ===
==== Passenger area ====
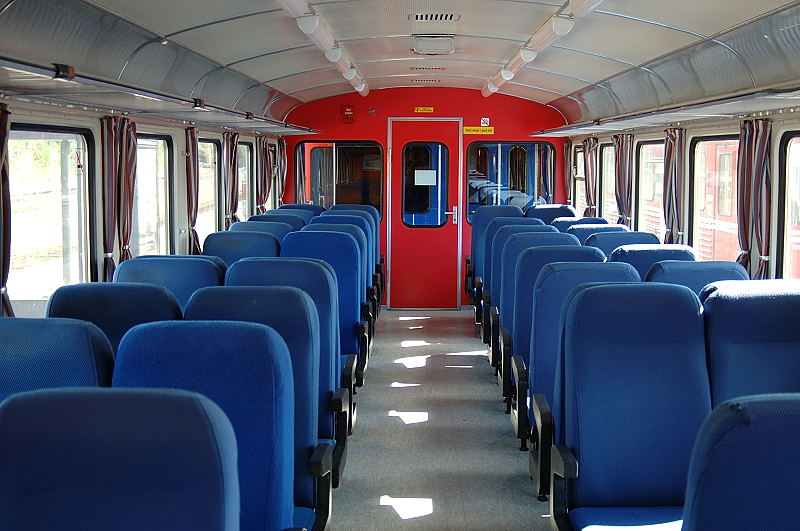
Passenger compartment of a control car

Interior layouts vary by operator, affecting seat count, door width, and amenities like toilets.

In motor cars, a baggage area behind the cab houses electrical equipment, a sink, a conductor's seat and table, bike racks, and a wheelchair tie-down space, accessed via double inward-opening doors. This leads to a passenger compartment with seats along the sides and a central aisle, overhead luggage racks, an optional toilet with a single door, and an entry vestibule with folding doors over steps.

Control cars mirror this layout but replace the baggage area with more passenger space. Trailer cars have vestibules at both ends flanking a similar passenger compartment.

Compartment partitions feature single sliding doors with windows. Inter-car gangways use rubber rollers, transition plates, and double inward-opening glazed doors. Windows – double-glazed in walls and doors – are fixed in rubber seals, except for two per compartment, which are two-part with tiltable upper sections.

Lighting includes ceiling fluorescent tubes and emergency incandescent lamps, powered at 220 V AC, 100 Hz, via two frequency converters per car. Heating comes from underfloor oil-fired units blowing warm air. A PA system allows cab announcements.

==== Driver's cab ====
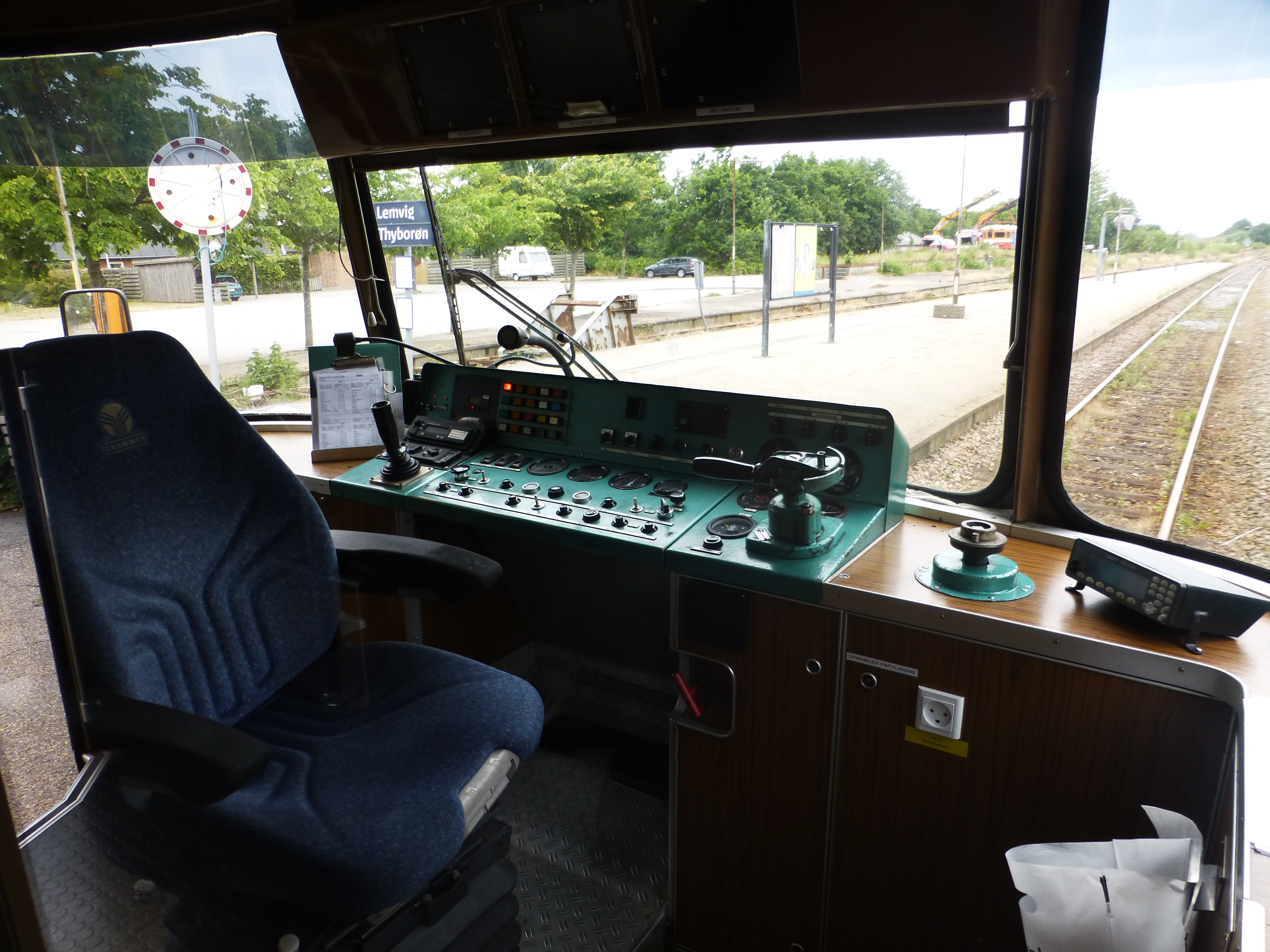
Driver's cab

The cab is accessed via a single sliding door without a window. It features a control desk and an adjustable driver's seat. Front windows use 10 mm (0.39 in) triple-layer glass, while side windows are 6 mm (0.24 in) double-layer curved glass.

=== Powertrain ===
Each motor car's two middle axles are driven by diesel engines suspended from the underframe via rubber-metal joint hangers.

Power comes from two diesel, four-stroke, inline-six, liquid-cooled engines in a horizontal layout. Early units used Büssing U11-200D engines (143 kW), while later batches had Daimler-Benz OM407h engines (162 kW). A hydro-mechanical Voith Diwa 506 transmission integrates a hydraulic torque converter with a differential, splitting power between hydraulic and mechanical systems at low to mid speeds, shifting fully to mechanical at higher speeds. Power reaches the driving wheels via a universal joint to a Voith V13 axle gearbox.

Direction changes use a reversing mechanism in the transmission.

=== Bogies ===
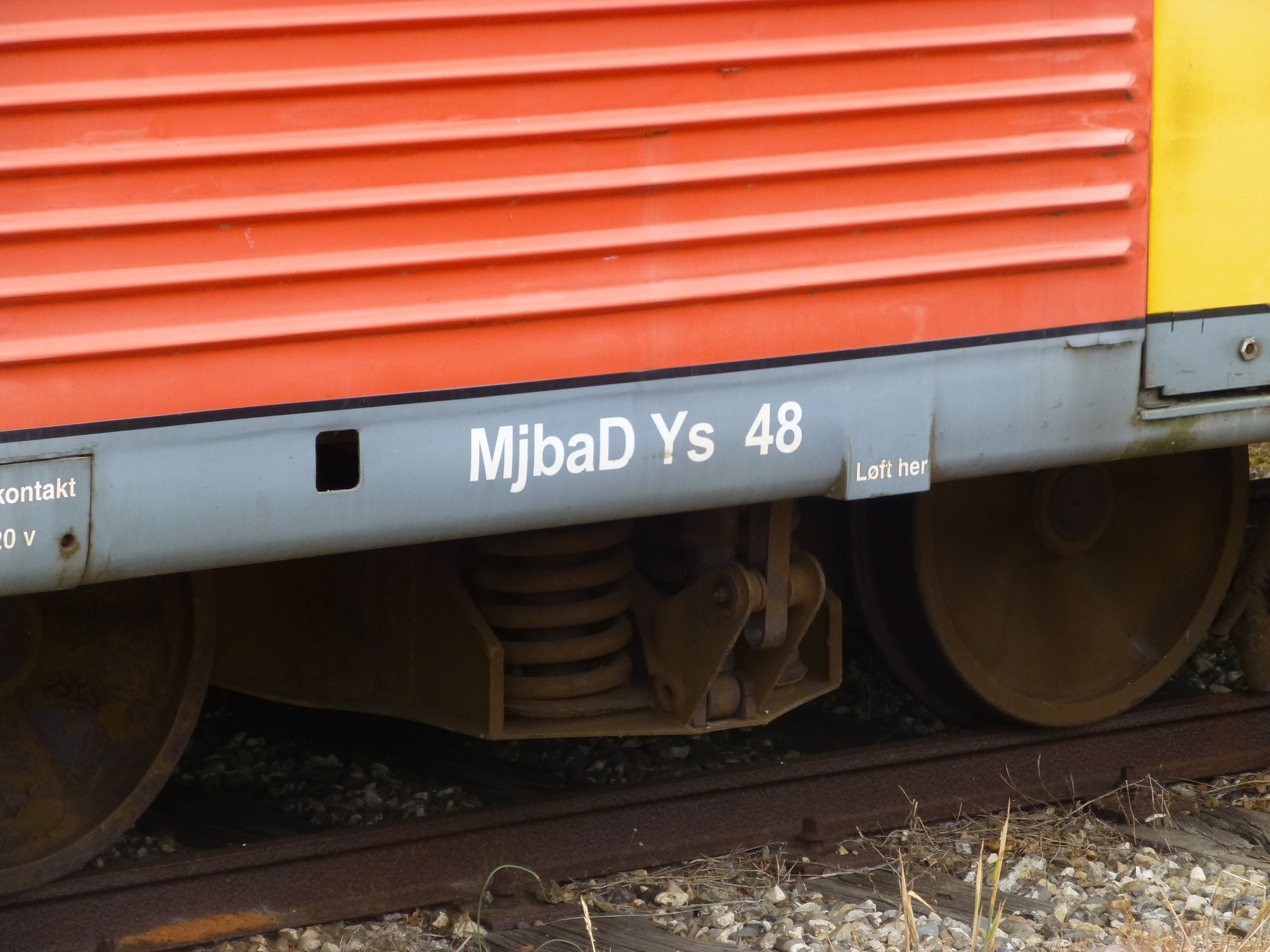
Wheelsets and suspension of a control car bogie

Each car rides on two twin-axle bogies with welded H-shaped box frames, supported by metal-rubber leaf springs between the wheels. The bolster rests on coil and rubber springs, with vibrations damped by anti-roll bars and hydraulic dampers.

Wheelsets feature 760 mm (29.9 in) diameter wheels with wavy discs and disc brakes. All cars have Knorr air and hand brakes, with motor and control cars adding an auxiliary air brakes.

== Operations ==
Country	Operator	Number of cars	Years of operation	Sources
Denmark	14 private companies	0 (160)	1965–2026	
Denmark	Danske Statsbaner	0 (160)	1984–2010	
Poland	Arriva PCC (until 25 June 2010) Arriva RP (from 25 June 2010)	0 (3)	2010	

=== Denmark ===
==== Private operators ====
Y-type trainsets were delivered to 14 Danish private operators. These units were operated by companies such as Odderbanen, Varde-Nørre Nebel Jernbane, Lemvigbanen, Østbanen, Gribskovbanen, Frederiksværkbanen, Hornbækbanen, Nærumbanen, Vestsjællands Lokalbaner, and Nordjyske Jernbaner.

The carriages were generally painted orange with a white stripe along the sides, although there were also liveries featuring red, gray, and white, as well as various patterns, as each operator had its own established color scheme.

Initially fitted with screw couplers and buffers for mixed passenger-freight trains, they later received automatic couplers when this practice ended. Some units added air conditioning.

The final private operator run occurred in late June 2012 by Varde-Nørre Nebel Jernbane, from Varde to Nørre Nebel. Units were scrapped at Helsingør.

In 2025, the Y-train has operated on the VLTJ for more than 40 years.

==== Danske Statsbaner ====
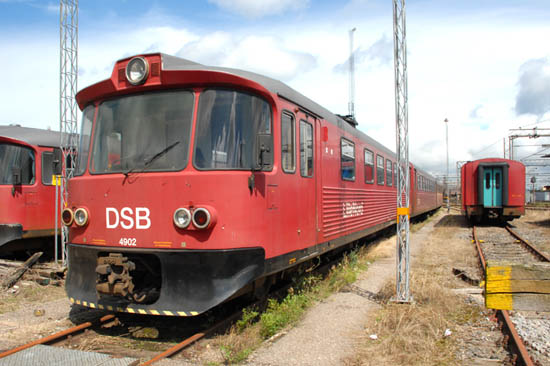
DSB unit at Helsingør (2007)

DSB began using Y-type units in 1984. Their three- or four-car sets used ML-series motor cars at both ends with one or two FL-series trailers, while nine dual-cab motor cars ran solo, all on the Hillerød–Helsingør route.

In the 1990s, replacement by IC2 and Desiro units began, retiring most Y-types except 1983–1988 models, which were refurbished between 1997 and 1999 at Hundested, including new interiors.

In 2001, DSB transferred all units to its subsidiary Hovedstadens Lokalbaner, which ran them until 2006 when Lokalbanen took over with LINT units. Returned to DSB, they were decommissioned in 2010 and scrapped at Helsingør, except for one museum unit and one sent to Arriva's Polish branch.

=== Poland ===
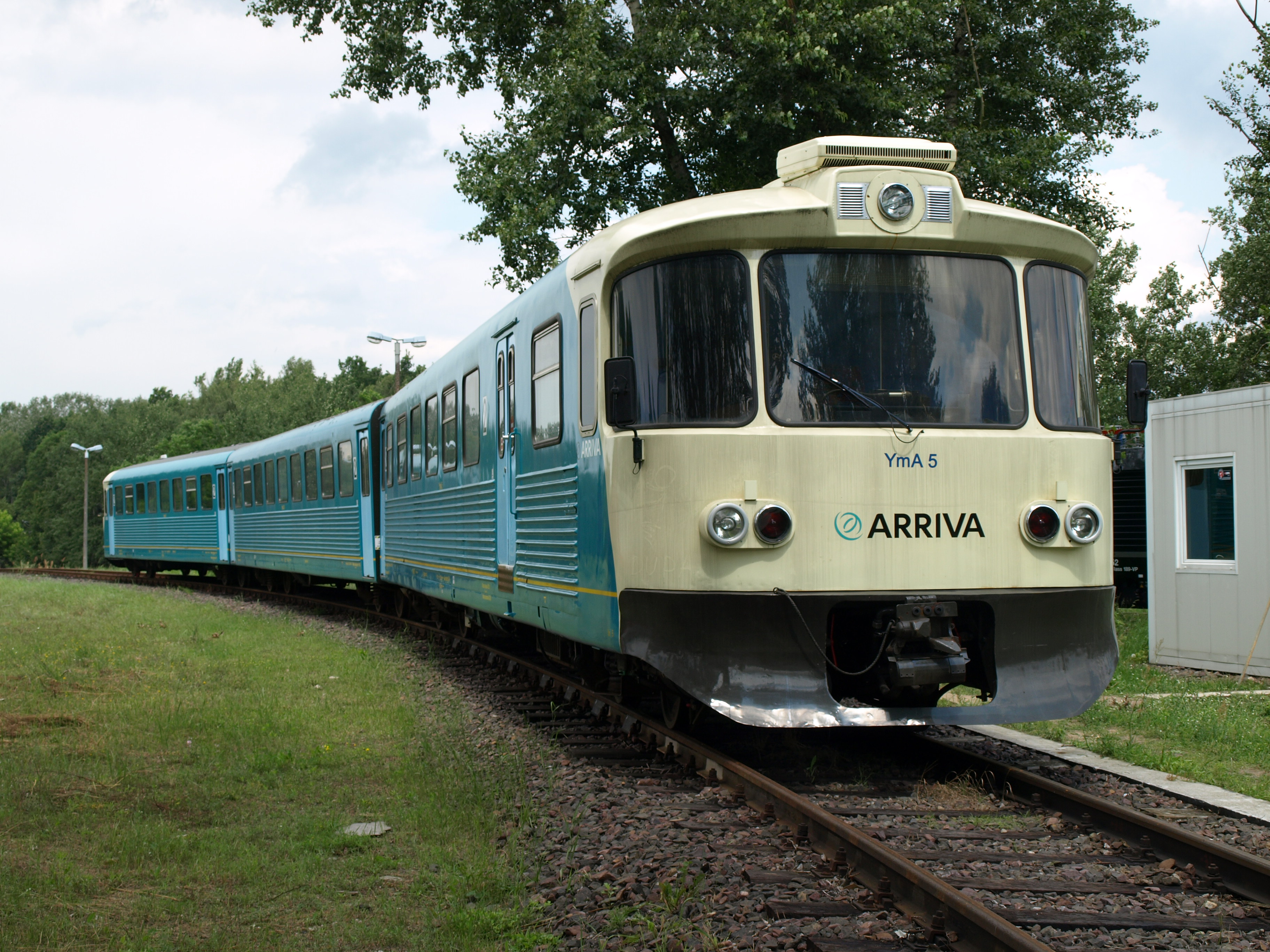
Ym5+Yp25+Ys47 at the Tabor Railway Vehicle Institute (2009)

On 19 June 2007, a PCC Rail Jaworzno and Arriva Polska consortium won a contract to operate non-electrified lines in Kuyavian-Pomeranian Voivodeship from 9 December 2007 to 11 December 2010. Even before the winner of this process was announced, the newly established company Arriva PCC, due to a shortage of rolling stock, decided to purchase used MR/MRD trainsets from Denmark as well as one Y-type trainset.

In 2008, Arriva acquired a Y-type unit from DSB – motor car Ym5 (1965), trailer Yp25 (1970), and control car Ys47 (1970) – which underwent a technical review and test runs in Denmark, repairs at Arriva Werke Nord in Neustrelitz, Germany, and modernization at the Tabor Railway Vehicle Institute in Poland. Upgrades included SHP, vigilance systems, Radio-Stop, fire sensors, new exterior lighting, seats, and flame-retardant materials, plus a new livery and Polish signage.

Approved for service on 19 February 2010, it began test runs on 12 March and regular service on 31 March after driver training in Denmark. The trailer Yp25 was removed in June due to frequent faults, leaving a Ym5+Ys47 configuration. On 27 November, it was showcased at Bydgoszcz Główna for Railwaymen's Day. Retired by late 2010, it entered long-term reserve.

Its 80 km/h (50 mph) top speed couldn't meet timetable demands or join Arriva Ekspress cycles. With newer domestic railbuses acquired, no reactivation is planned.
