= List of railway lines in Denmark =

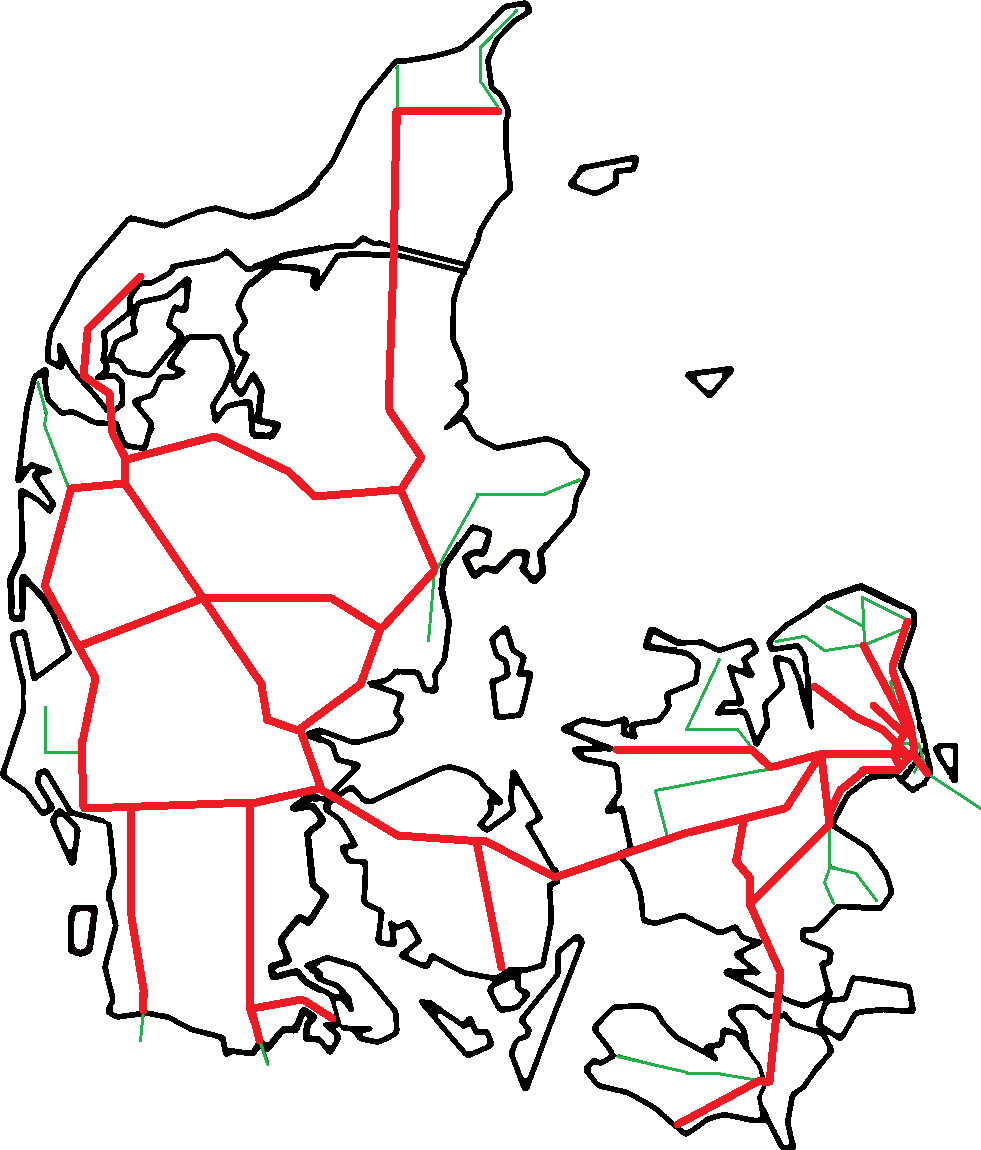
Banedanmark lines (red) and other lines (green).

Denmark has more than 2,000 kilometres (1,200 mi) of railway lines, of which most are under the control of Banedanmark; a number of private railways run their own lines.

== Banedanmark lines ==
- Copenhagen–Fredericia/Taulov
- Copenhagen–Ringsted
- Ringsted–Rødby Færge (Sydbanen, part of Fugleflugtslinien)
- Nykøbing F–Gedser (Gedserbanen)
- Roskilde–Køge–Næstved (Lille Syd)
- Roskilde–Kalundborg (Nordvestbanen)
- Lersøen–Østerport
- The S-train network
- Copenhagen–Helsingør (Kystbanen)
- Copenhagen/Vigerslev–Peberholm (Øresundsbanen)
- Odense–Svendborg (Svendborgbanen)
- Fredericia–Aarhus
- Århus–Aalborg
- Aalborg–Frederikshavn (Vendsysselbanen)
- Lindholm–Aalborg Airport (Lufthavnsbanen)
- Fredericia–Padborg
- Sønderborg–Tinglev (Sønderborgbanen)
- Lunderskov–Esbjerg
- Bramming–Tønder
- Esbjerg–Struer
- Langå–Struer
- Vejle–Holstebro
- Struer–Thisted (Thistedbanen)
- Skanderborg–Skjern
- Århus–Grenå (Grenåbanen)

=== Under construction/planned ===
- Billund railway line (planned)
- Hovedgård-Hasselager (planned)
- Ringsted-Femern (55 kilometres (34 mi) of new track under construction)

== Other ==
In addition to Banedanmark's network, 535 kilometres (332 mi) of railway are under the control of various other companies:

=== Local lines around the capital ===
- Elsinore–Gilleleje (Hornbækbanen)
- Hillerød–Tisvildeleje (Gribskovbanen)
- Kagerup–Gilleleje (Gribskovbanen)
- Hillerød–Hundested (Frederiksværkbanen)
- Hillerød–Snekkersten (Lille Nord)
- Jægersborg–Nærum (Nærumbanen)
- Køge–Fakse Ladeplads (Østbanen)
- Hårlev–Rødvig (Østbanen)

=== Regional trains ===
- Holbæk–Nykøbing Sjælland (Odsherredbanen)
- Tølløse–Slagelse (Tølløsebanen)
- Nykøbing Falster–Nakskov (Lollandsbanen)

=== Vestbanen ===
- Varde–Nørre Nebel

=== Railways of central Jutland ===
- Århus–Odder (Odderbanen)
- Vemb–Lemvig–Thyborøn (Lemvigbanen)

=== Railways of northern Jutland ===
- Frederikshavn–Skagen (Skagensbanen)
- Hjørring–Hirtshals (Hirtshalsbanen)

=== Metroselskabet (Copenhagen Metro) ===
- Vanløse–Vestamager
- Vanløse–Lufthavnen

== Closed railway lines ==
- Allingebanen
- Assensbanen
- Gudhjembanen
- Nexøbanen

== See also ==
- Rail transport in Denmark
- Category:Railway lines in Denmark
