= Lolland Line =

Railway line in Denmark

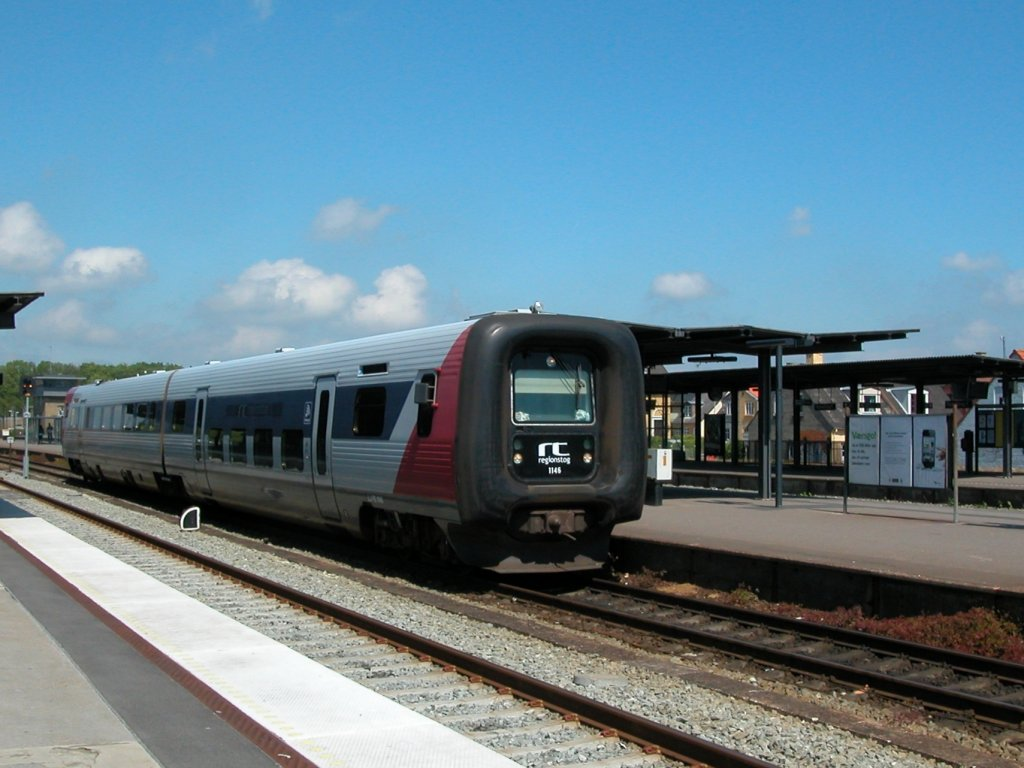
- Lollandsbanen

Overview
- Native name: Lollandsbanen
- Status: Operational
- Termini: Nykøbing Falster; Nakskov
- Stations: 9

Service
- Type: Heavy rail
- System: Danish railway
- Operator(s): Lokaltog

History
- Opened: 1 July 1874

Technical
- Line length: 50.2 km (31.2 mi)
- Number of tracks: Single track
- Character: Local trains
- Track gauge: 1,435 mm (4 ft 8 1/2 in) standard gauge
- Operating speed: 100 km/h
The Nykøbing Falster–Nakskov railway line
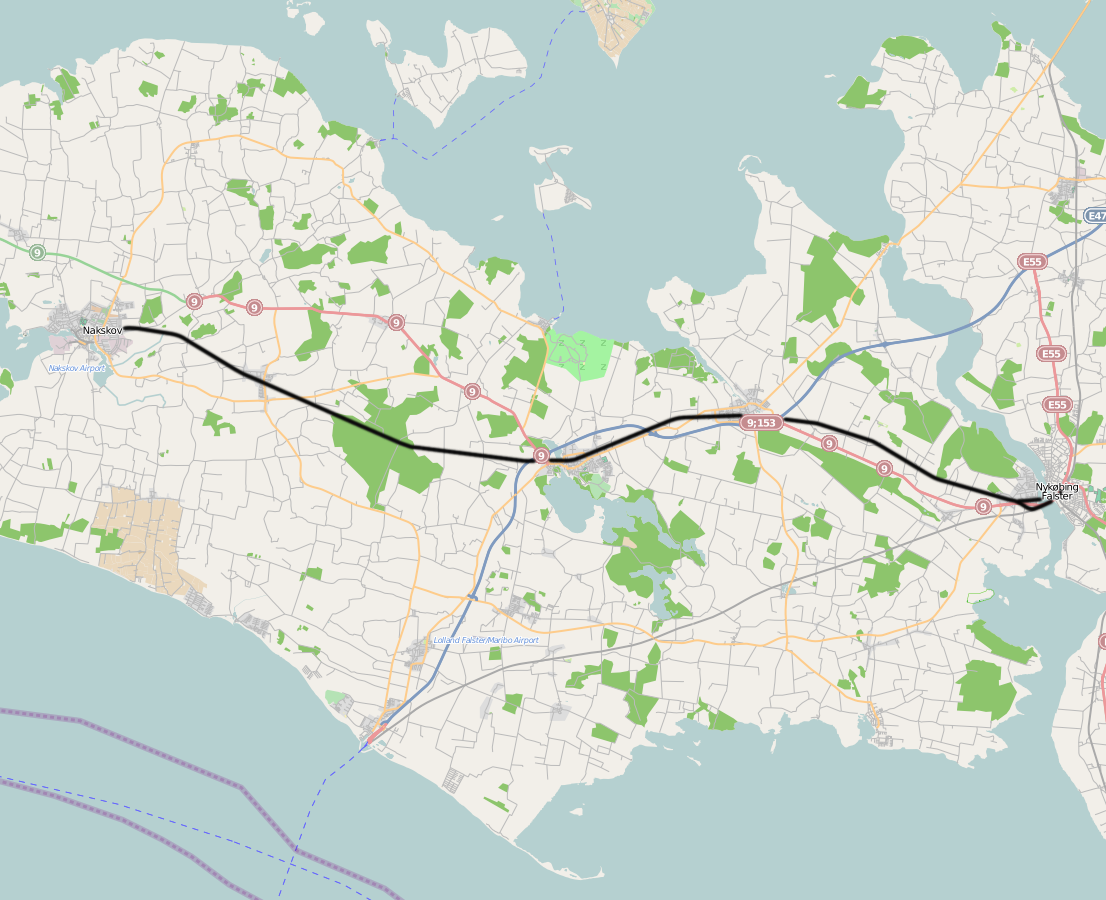

The Lolland Line (Danish: Lollandsbanen) is a 50.2 kilometres (31.2 mi) long railway line in Denmark which runs mostly on the island of Lolland between the cities of Nykøbing Falster and Nakskov via Maribo.

The railway line opened in 1874. It is currently operated by the regional railway company Lokaltog which runs frequent local train services from Nakskov to Nykøbing Falster with onward connections from Nykøbing to the rest of Denmark.

== Stations ==
- Nykøbing Falster
- Øster Toreby^{(X)}
- Grænge^{(X)}
- Sakskøbing
- Maribo
- Ryde^{(X)}
- Søllested
- Avnede^{(X)}
- Nakskov

== Operating company ==
Lollandsbanen A/S
- Company type: Aktieselskab
- Predecessor: Det Lolland-Falsterske Jernbane-Selskab
- Founded: 1954
- Defunct: 2009
- Fate: Merged with Vestsjællands Lokalbaner A/S and Østbanen A/S to Regionstog A/S
- Headquarters: Denmark
- Area served: Denmark
- Services: Rail transport
- Website: www.lollandsbanen.dk (defunct)

Until 2009, the Lolland Line was operated by the Danish railway company A/S Lollandsbanen. Established in 1954, it was based on the remains of Det Lolland-Falsterske Jernbane-Selskab (LFJS). The company received funding from the now defunct Storstrøm County and from the central government.

The company was merged with Vestsjællands Lokalbaner A/S and Østbanen into a new company, Regionstog A/S, on 1 January 2009 and then on 1 July 2015 into Lokaltog A/S.

== See also ==
- List of railway lines in Denmark
- Rail transport in Denmark
- History of rail transport in Denmark
- Lokaltog
- Regionstog
- Lolland
