= Søllested =

- town
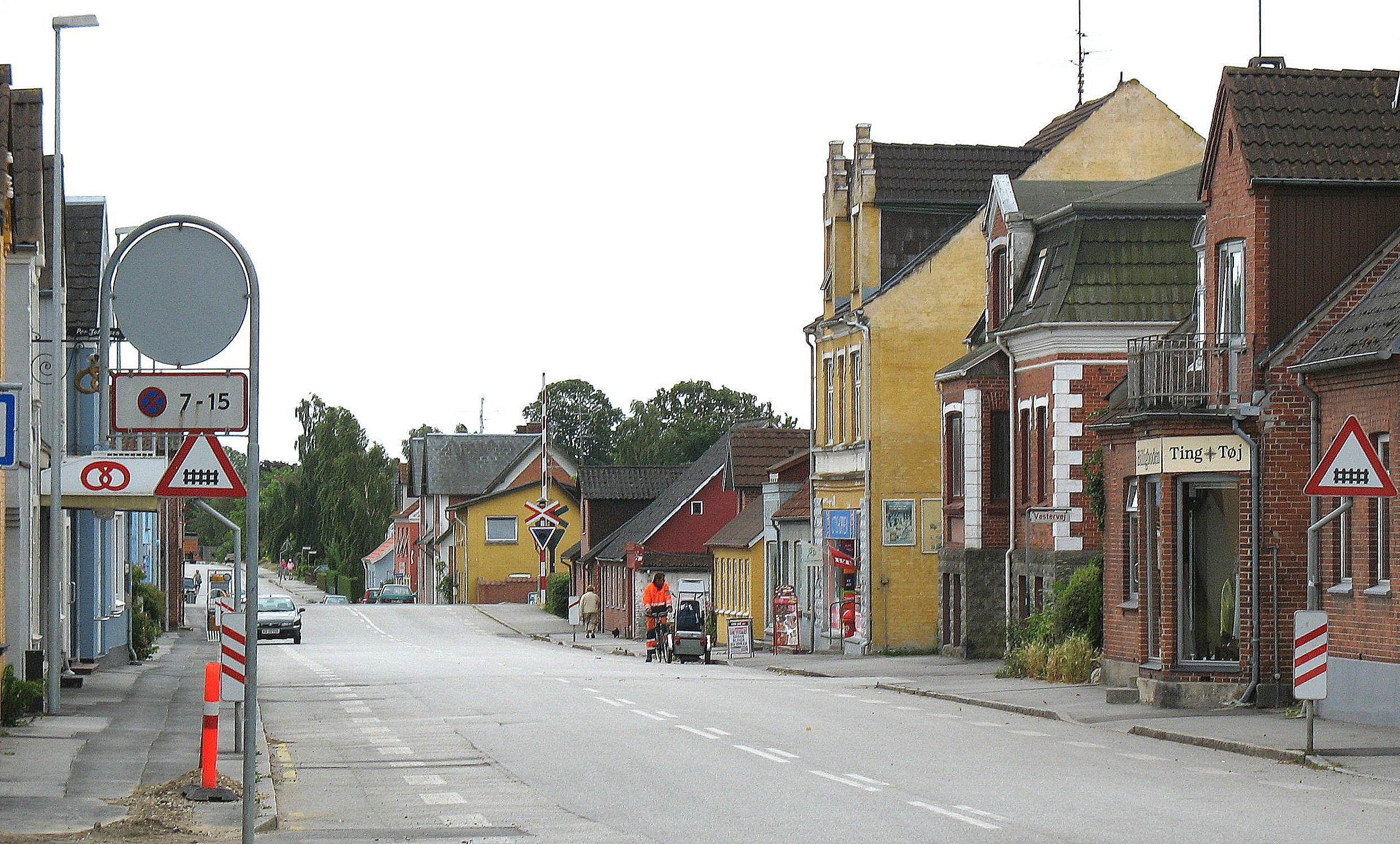
- Søllested located on the island of Lolland

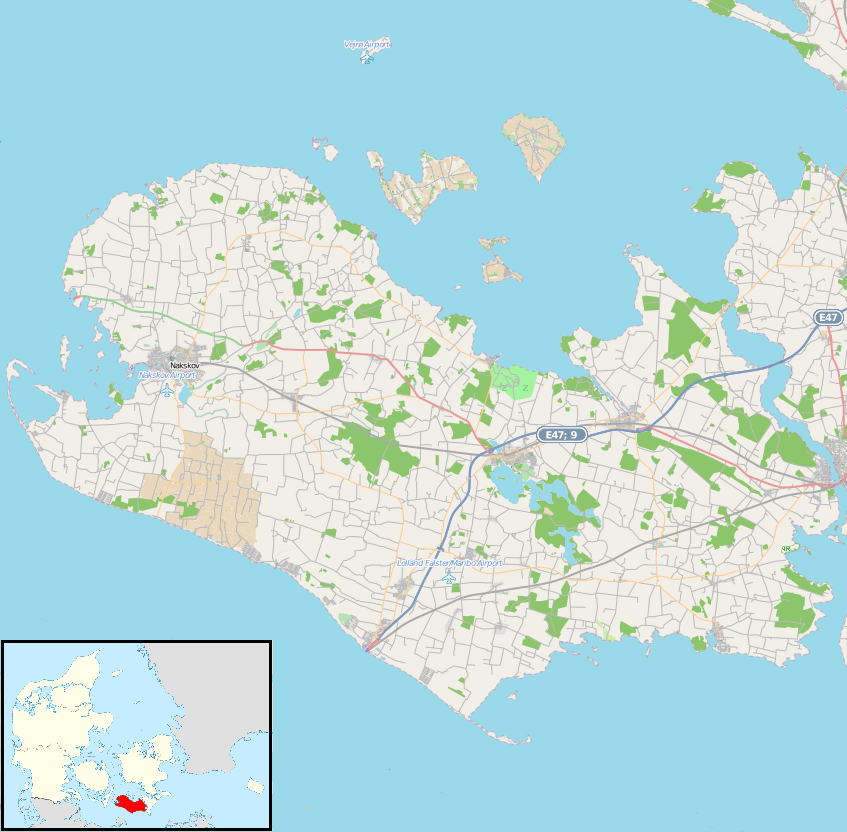
- The location of Søllested on Lolland Søllested (Denmark Region Zealand) Søllested (Denmark)
- Coordinates: 54.81162°N 11.26987°E
- Country: Denmark
- Region: Zealand (Sjælland)
- Municipality: Lolland

Area
  - Urban: 1.26 km^{2} (0.49 sq mi)

Population (2026)
  - Urban: 1,347
  - Urban density: 1,070/km^{2} (2,770/sq mi)
- Time zone: UTC+1 (CET)
  - Summer (DST): UTC+2 (CEST)
- Postal code: DK-4920 Søllested

Søllested is a small railway town on the island of Lolland in south Denmark. The town lies 9 km east of Nakskov. Søllested has a population of 1,347 (1 January 2026).

Søllested was the administrative centre of the former Højreby Municipality in Denmark. Since 1 January 2007, it has been a part of the new Lolland Municipality in Region Sjælland.

Søllested is served by Søllested railway station, located on the Lolland railway line between Nakskov and Nykøbing Falster. The town is located at the intersection of secondary roads 275 and 291, c. 4 km (2.5 mi) south of Danish national road 9, which connects Odense and Nykøbing Falster.

== Notable people ==
- Peter Erasmus Christian Kaalund (1844 in Søllested – 1919) a Danish philologist who specialized in Scandinavian studies
- Torben Tryde (1916 – 1998 in Søllested) a Danish lieutenant colonel, writer, Olympian, resistance fighter and the last person to be appointed kammerjunker by the Danish Court.
- Poul Popiel (born 1943 in Søllested) a Danish-American former professional ice hockey defenceman
