= Vestsjællands Lokalbaner =

Danish railway company

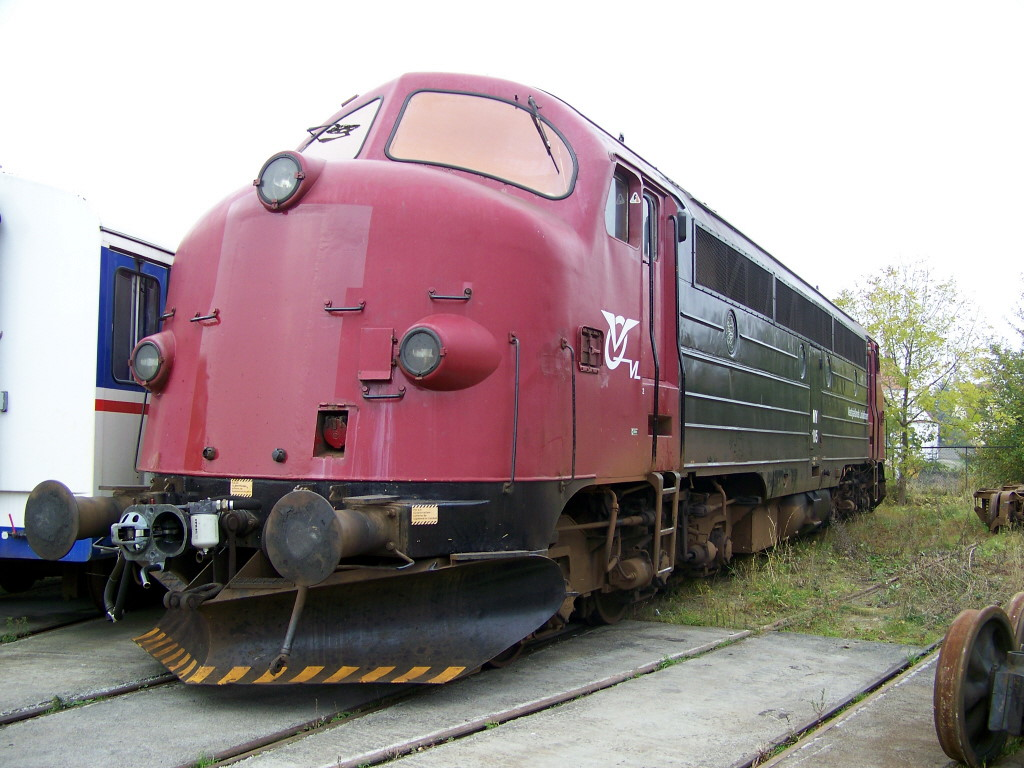
One of the railway's locomotives, an MY locomotive.

Vestsjællands Lokalbaner A/S (literally The Local Railways of West Zealand, abbreviated VL) was a Danish railway company. It existed from 2003 to 2009.

== History ==
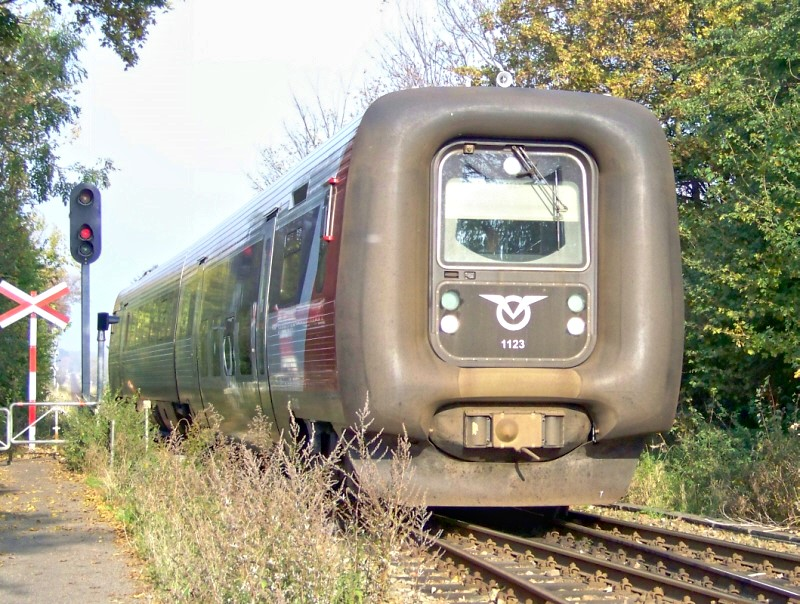
One of Vestsjællands Lokalbaners IC2 trains entering Fårevejle station. Autumn 2003.

A merger of Odsherreds Jernbane A/S (OHJ) and Høng-Tølløse Jernbane A/S (HTJ), VL was established in May 2003 after several years of close cooperation between the two companies. The company operated the former OHJ and HTJ lines, that is, Holbæk–Nykøbing Sjælland and Tølløse–Slagelse, respectively. The company workshop and headquarters were located in Holbæk.

The company was merged with Lollandsbanen A/S and Østbanen into a new company, Regionstog A/S, on 1 January 2009. Regionstog A/S merged again with Lokalbanen A/S in 2015 to form the railway company Lokaltog A/S.

== See also ==
- Lokaltog
- Rail transport in Denmark
