= Regionstog =

Regionstog A/S
- Founded: 2009
- Defunct: 2015
- Headquarters: Holbæk, Denmark
- Area served: Denmark
- Services: Passenger transportation
- Website: www.regionstog.dk

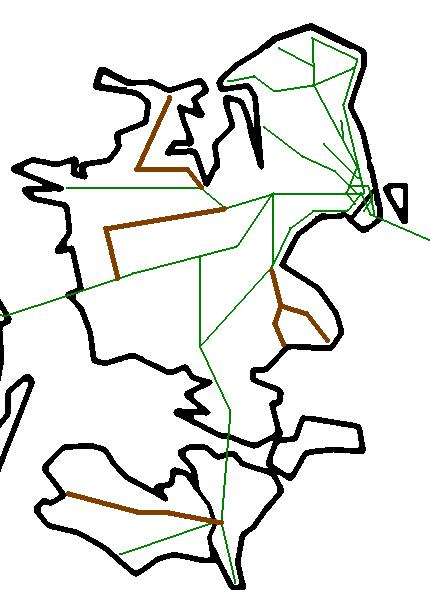
Map of railway lines on the island of Zealand, Denmark. Red lines indicate lines operated by Regionstog.

Regionstog A/S was a Danish railway company responsible for train operation on three private railway lines in Region Zealand: the Tølløse Line, the East Line and the Lolland Line. It was established in 2009 when Vestsjællands Lokalbaner A/S, Østbanen and Lollandsbanen A/S where merged. It merged with Lokalbanen A/S in 2015 to form the railway company Lokaltog A/S. Regionstog had administrative offices in Maribo and Holbæk.

== Railway lines ==
- Lollandsbanen (Nakskov-Nykøbing F.), which is 50.2 km long, was opened in 1874 and transports approx. 875,000 passengers.
- Østbanen (Køge-Faxe Ladeplads / Køge-Rødvig), which is 46.2 km long, was opened in 1879, and transports approx. 900,000 passengers.
- Tølløsebanen (Holbæk)-Tølløse-Slagelse, which is 50.8 km long, was opened in 1901, and transports approx. 555,000 passengers.
- Odsherredsbanen (Holbæk-Nykøbing Sj), which is 49.4 km long, was opened in 1899, and transports approx. 1.1 million passengers.

== See also ==
- Lokalbanen
- DSB (railway company)
- S-train
- Rail transport in Denmark
