= DBAG Class 648 =

German diesel train

DB AG Class 648
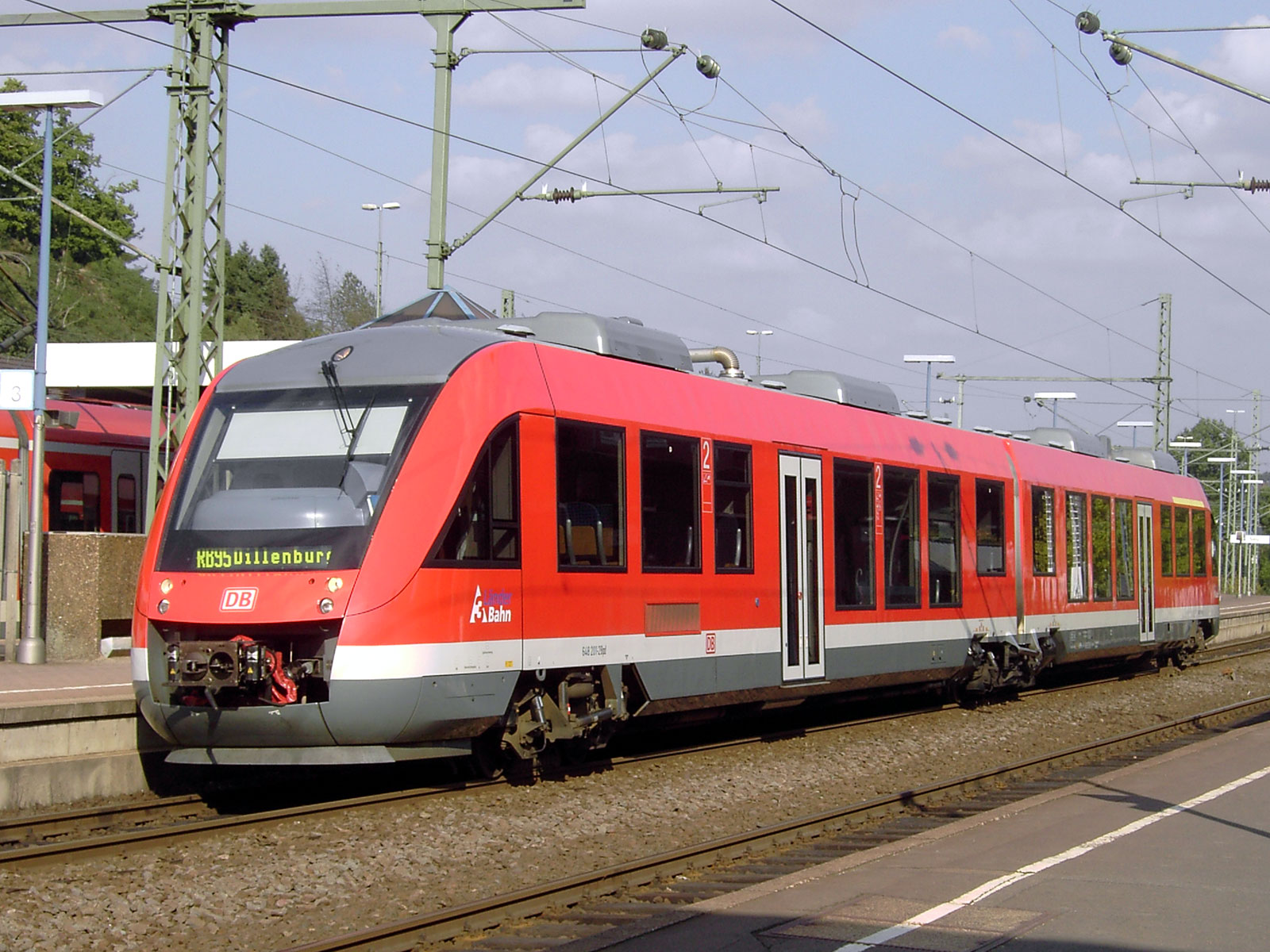
- Class 648 207
- Stock type: Diesel multiple unit
- Manufacturer: Alsthom LHB
- Entered service: 2000
- Number built: 61+
- Operators: Deutsche Bahn

Specifications
- Car length: 41.81 m (137 ft 2 1/8 in)
- Maximum speed: 120 km/h (75 mph)
- Weight: Service: 155 t (153 long tons; 171 short tons)
- Engine type: Diesel engine
- Transmission: Hydrodynamic
- AAR wheel arrangement: B′2′B′
- Coupling system: Scharfenberg

The Class 648 is a two car, diesel multiple unit operated by the Deutsche Bahn for stopping regional rail services on unelectrified lines.

== General Information ==
The class are also known as Alstom Coradia LINT 41, which is used by many railway operators across Europe.

== Liveries ==
All units are in the standard Verkehrsrot Red livery, however some carry brands for the areas they operate in such as HarzWeserBahn.

== Services ==
DB Class 648 are used on the following services in the different regions (2011):

=== Bavaria ===
- Nürnberg - Neuhaus
- Nürnberg - Simmelsdorf-Hüttenbach
- Fürth - Cadolzburg
- Fürth - Markt Erlbach
- Neustadt Aisch - Steinach - Rothenburg

=== Lower Saxony ===
- Bad Harzburg - Goslar - Seesen - Kreiensen - [Northeim - Göttingen] / [Holzminden]
- Braunschweig - Salzgitter - Seesen - Herzberg
- Nordhausen - Herzberg - Northeim - [Göttingen]/[Bodenfelde]
- RB85 - Göttingen - Bodenfelde - Ottbergen
- RB86 - Northeim - Bodenfelde - [Ottbergen]
- RB37 - Uelzen - Soltau - Bremen Hbf

=== North Rhine-Westphalia ===
- RB36 - Oberhausen–Meiderich-Ruhrort
- RB52 - Dortmund - Herdecke - Hagen - Brügge - Lüdenscheid
- RB53 - Dortmund - Schwerte - Iserlohn
- RB54 - Unna - Fröndenberg - Menden - Neuenrade
- RE57 - Dortmund - Hörde - Fröndenberg - Arnsberg - Meschede - Bestwig - Winterberg
- RB92 - Finnentrop - Attendorn - Sondern - Olpe
- RB93 - Siegen - Kreuztal - Hilchenbach - Vormwald - Erndtebrück - Birkelbach - Bad Berleburg
- RB95 - Dillenburg - Haiger - Siegen - Betzdorf - Wissen - Au

=== Schleswig-Holstein ===
- Büchen - Aumühle
- Flensburg - Kiel
- Lübeck - Travemünde
- Lübeck - Puttgarden
- Lübeck - Kiel
- Lübeck - Lüneburg
- Kiel - Neumunster

== Citations ==
- Garvin, Brian (2013). German Railways: The Complete Guide to All Locomotives and Multiple Units of Deutsche Bahn. Vol. 1. Sheffield, UK: Platform 5 Publishing. ISBN 978-1-9094-3103-4.
- Garvin, Brian (2015). German Railways: The Complete Guide to All Locomotives and Multiple Units of Deutsche Bahn. Vol. 2. Sheffield, UK: Platform 5 Publishing. ISBN 978-1-9094-3118-8.
