= Alstom Coradia LINT =

German articulated railcar

Coradia LINT
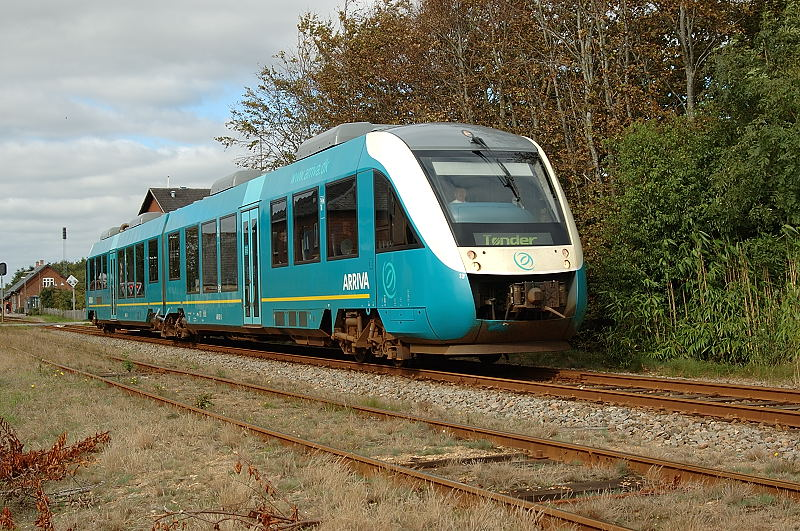
- Coradia LINT 41 operated by Arriva, Denmark

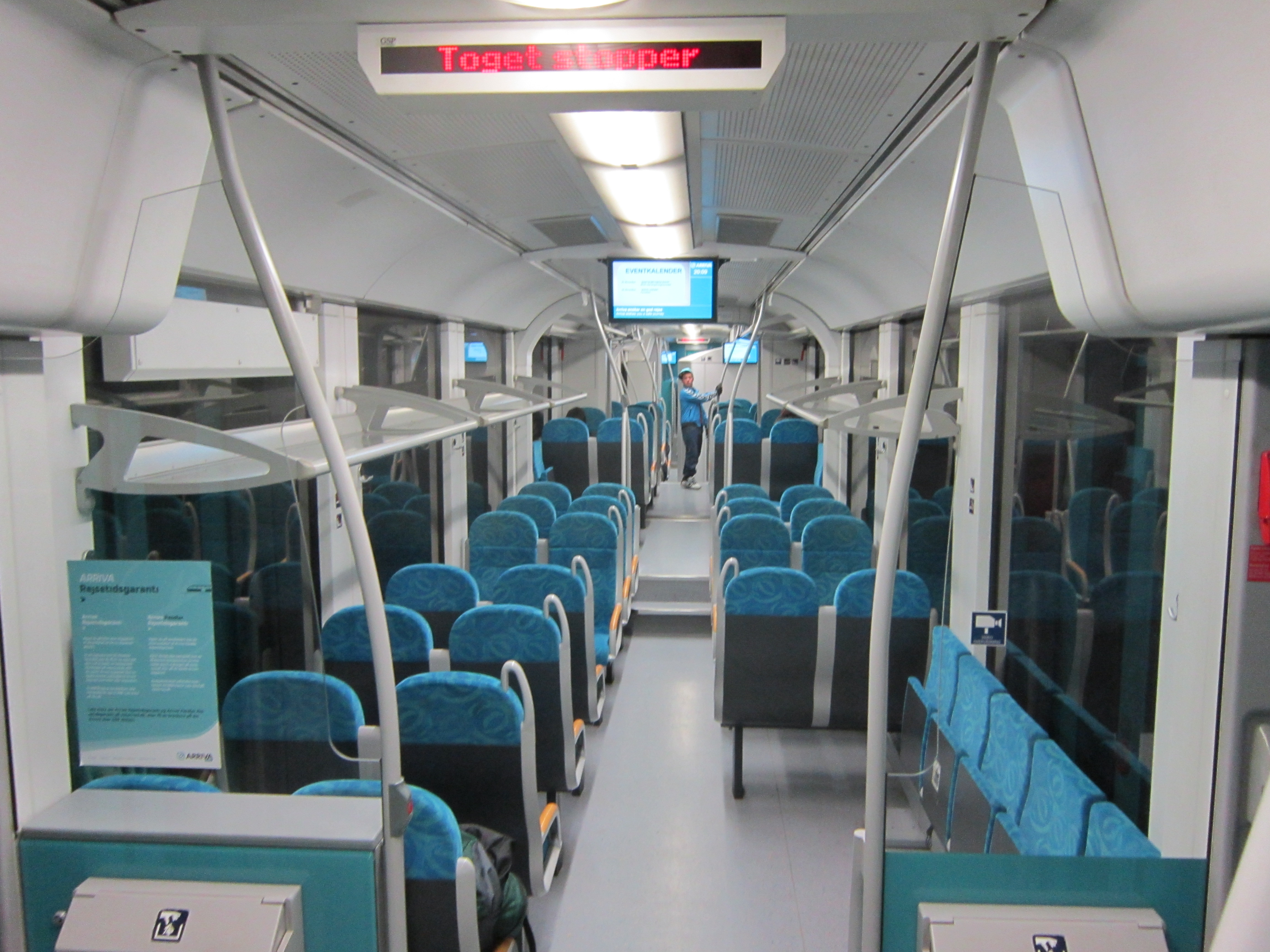
- Arriva Denmark LINT 41 interior

Specifications
- Train length: LINT 41: two cars, 41.89 m (137 ft 5 1/4 in)
- Car length: LINT 27: 27.26 m (89 ft 5 1/4 in)
- Maximum speed: 140 km/h (87 mph)
- Prime mover: MAN D2676LE62X

The Alstom Coradia LINT is an articulated railcar of the Alstom Coradia family manufactured by Alstom since 1999, offered in diesel and hydrogen vehicle models. The acronym LINT is short for the German "leichter innovativer Nahverkehrstriebwagen" (light innovative local transport rail vehicle). It was designed by Linke-Hofmann-Busch (LHB; acquired 1996 by Alstom) and has been distributed as part of Alstom's Coradia family.

== Description ==
The type designation gives the vehicle's length: the one-piece type LINT 27 has a length of 27.26 metres (89 ft 5 in) and is also known as Baureihe 640 (DB class 640) of Deutsche Bahn. The two-part train with a Jacobs-bogie, LINT 41, is 41.89 metres (137 ft 5 in) long. In Germany it is classified as Baureihe 648 (DB Class 648), Baureihe 0623 and Baureihe 1648. Trainsets LINT 54 Baureihe 0622 using two car bodies and LINT 81 Baureihe 0620/0621 using three car bodies have been introduced in 2013.

The Alstom Coradia LINT is part of Alstom Coradia family of Inter-city trains which includes multiple unit diesel (DMU) or electric (EMU) as well as double-decker trains. The LINT family offers capacities ranging from 70 to 300 seated passengers. They operate at top speeds up to 140 km/h (87 mph).

The Coradia LINT trains are manufactured in Salzgitter in Germany. Other types of the Coradia range are the A-TER family manufactured in Reichshoffen in France and the Coradia Minuetto manufactured in Savigliano in Italy.

=== LINT 27 ===
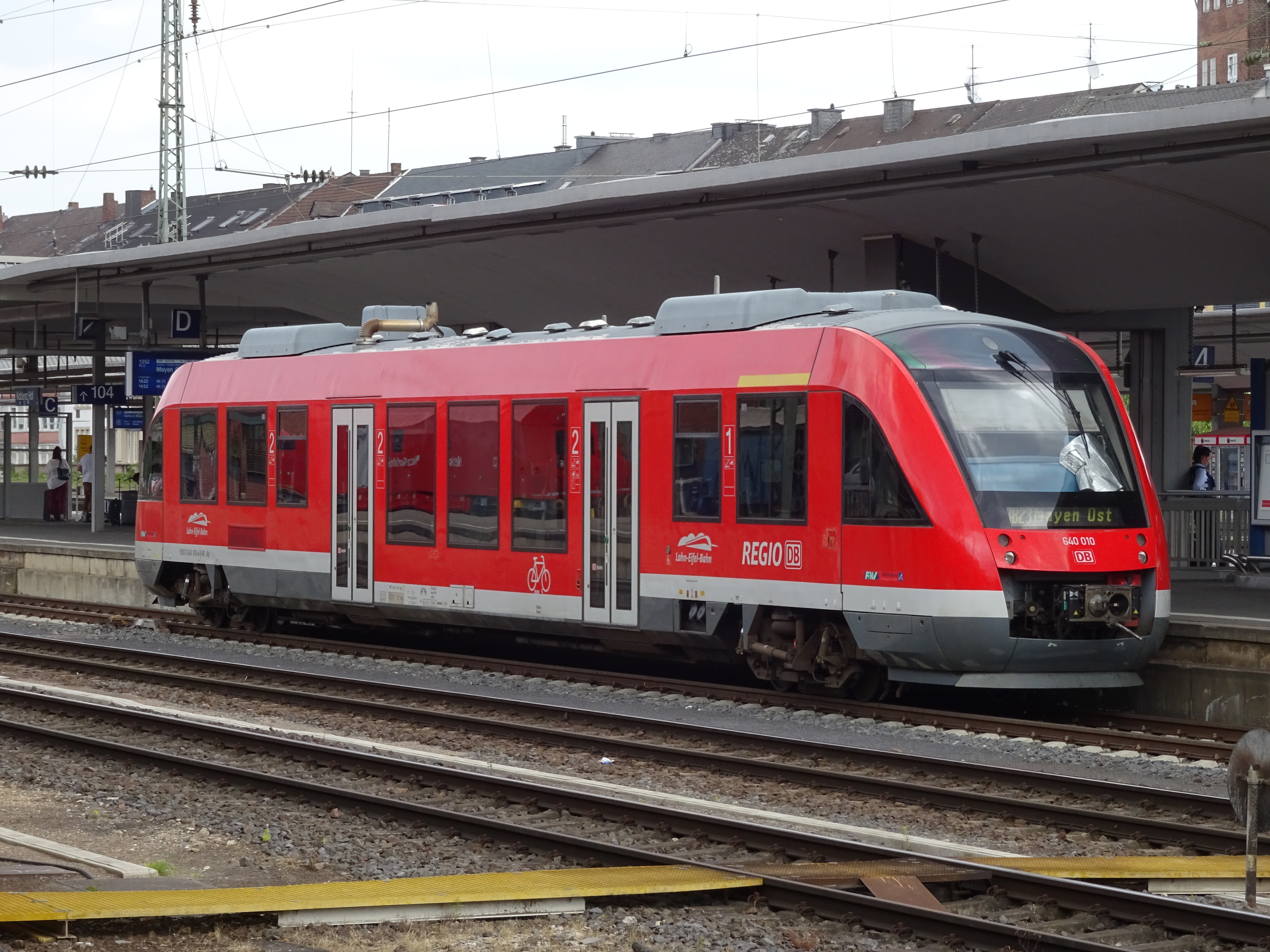
Lint 27 No. 640 010 - Koblenz Hauptbahnhof 18th July 2019

The one-piece railcars have 315-kilowatt (422 hp) engines and a maximum speed of 120 km/h (75 mph). The train has 52 2nd class seats, eight 1st class seats and 13 tip-up seats. Up to three cars can run together in multiple unit form.

The trains are predominantly used on non-electrified light railways in North Rhine-Westphalia amongst other regions.

=== LINT 41 and LINT 54 ===
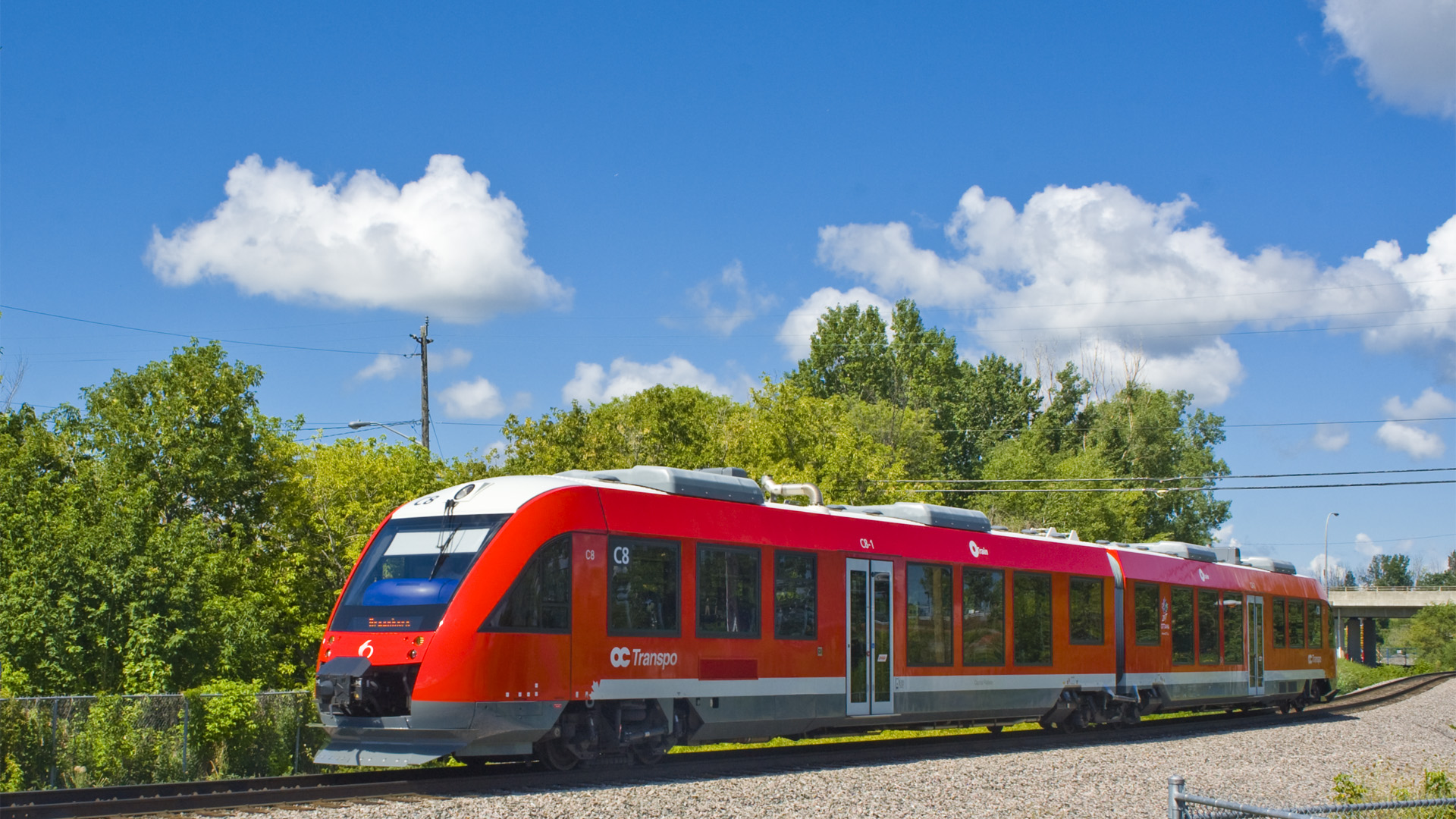
LINT 41 of O-Train in Ottawa, Canada

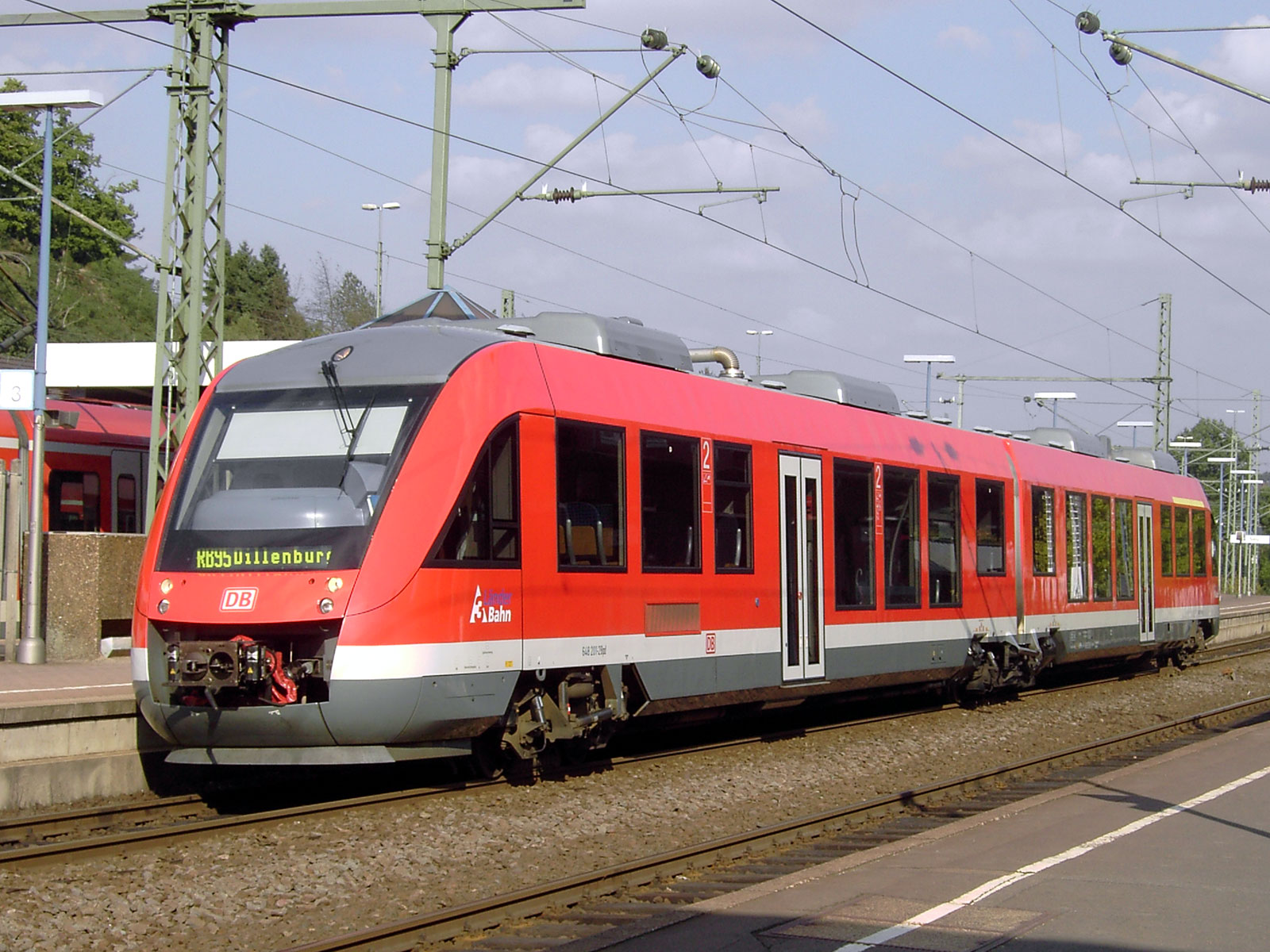
LINT 41 of DB Regio in Germany

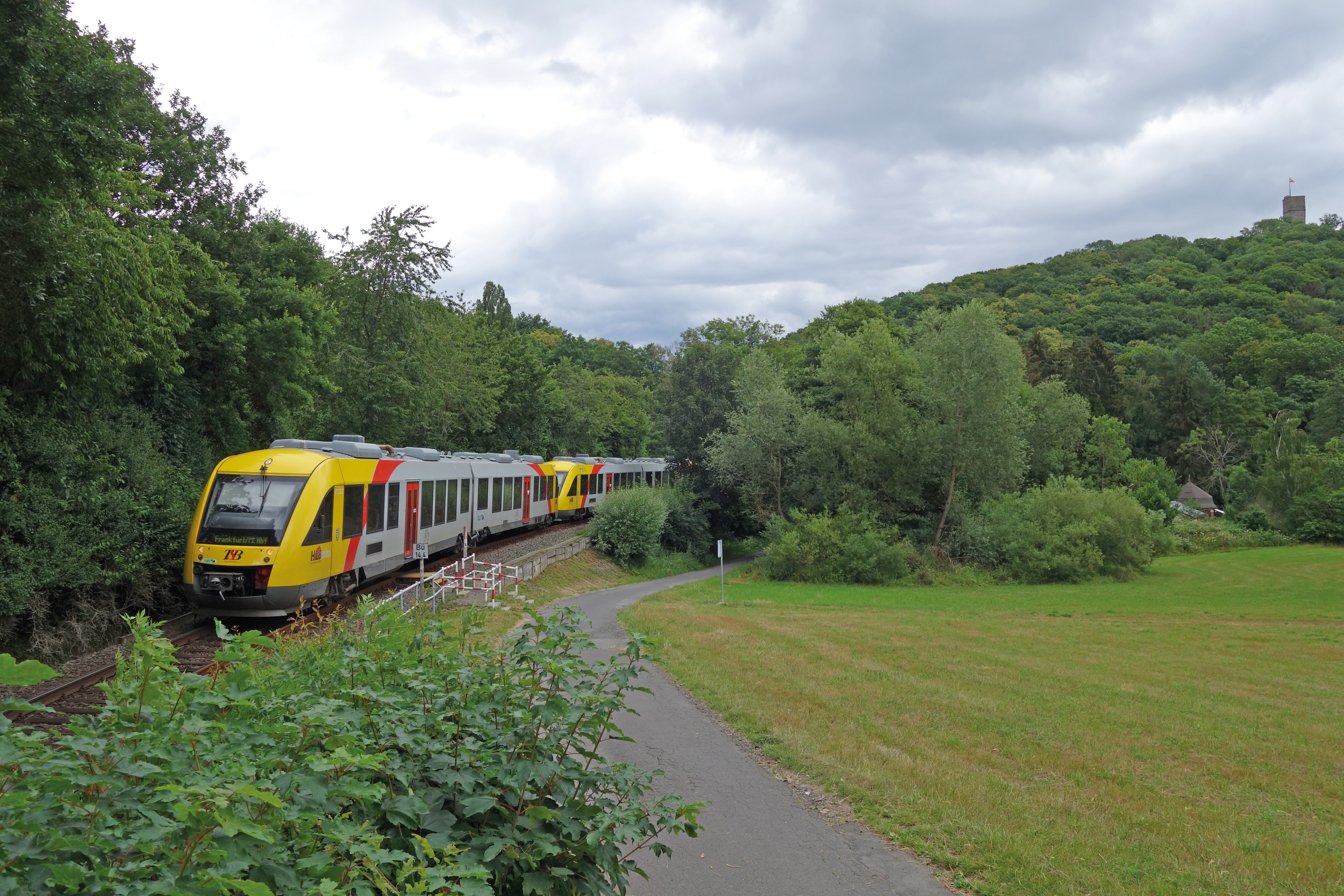
LINT 41 of Hessische Landesbahn in Hesse, Germany

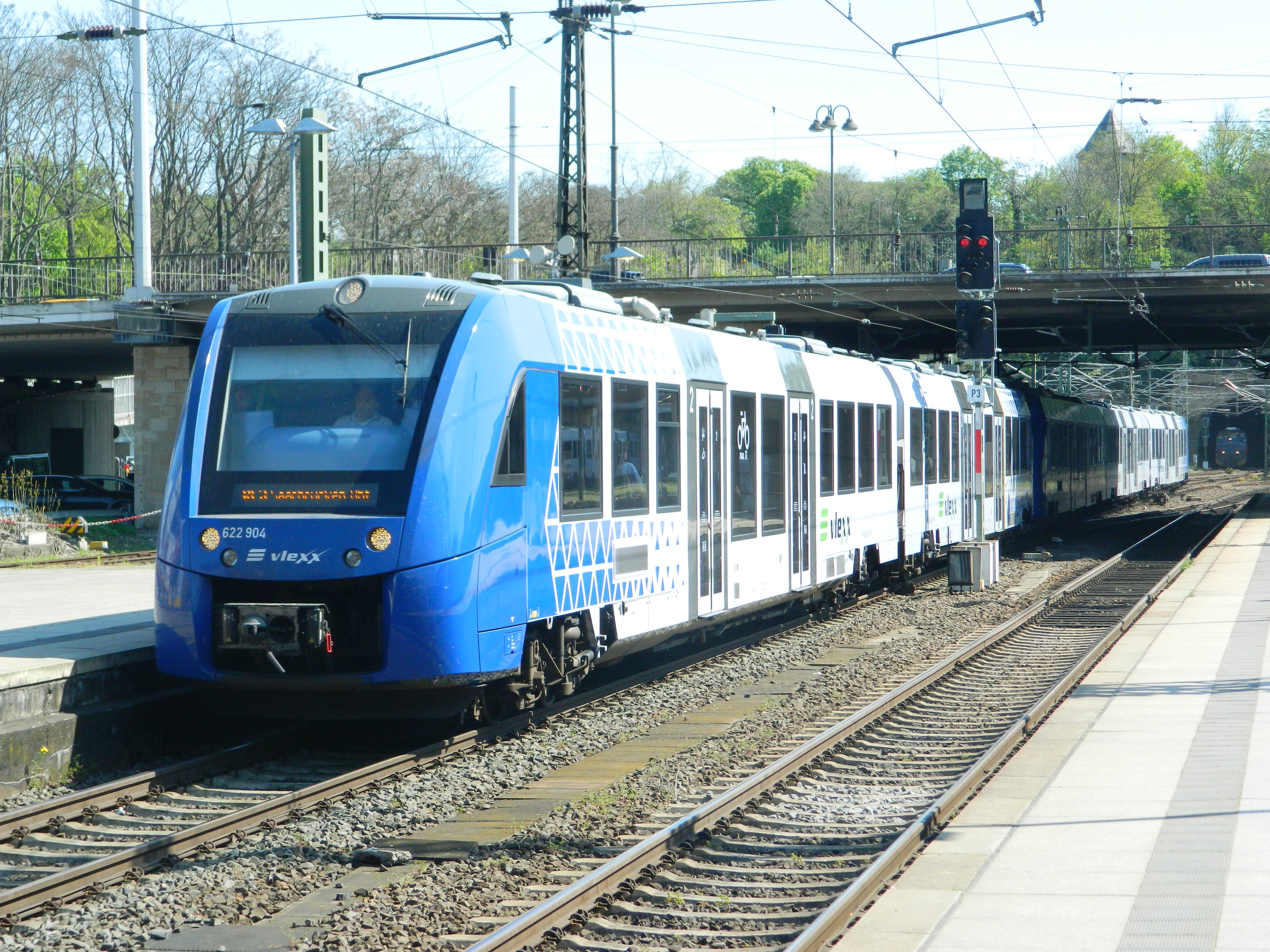
LINT 54 of Vlexx at Mainz Hbf

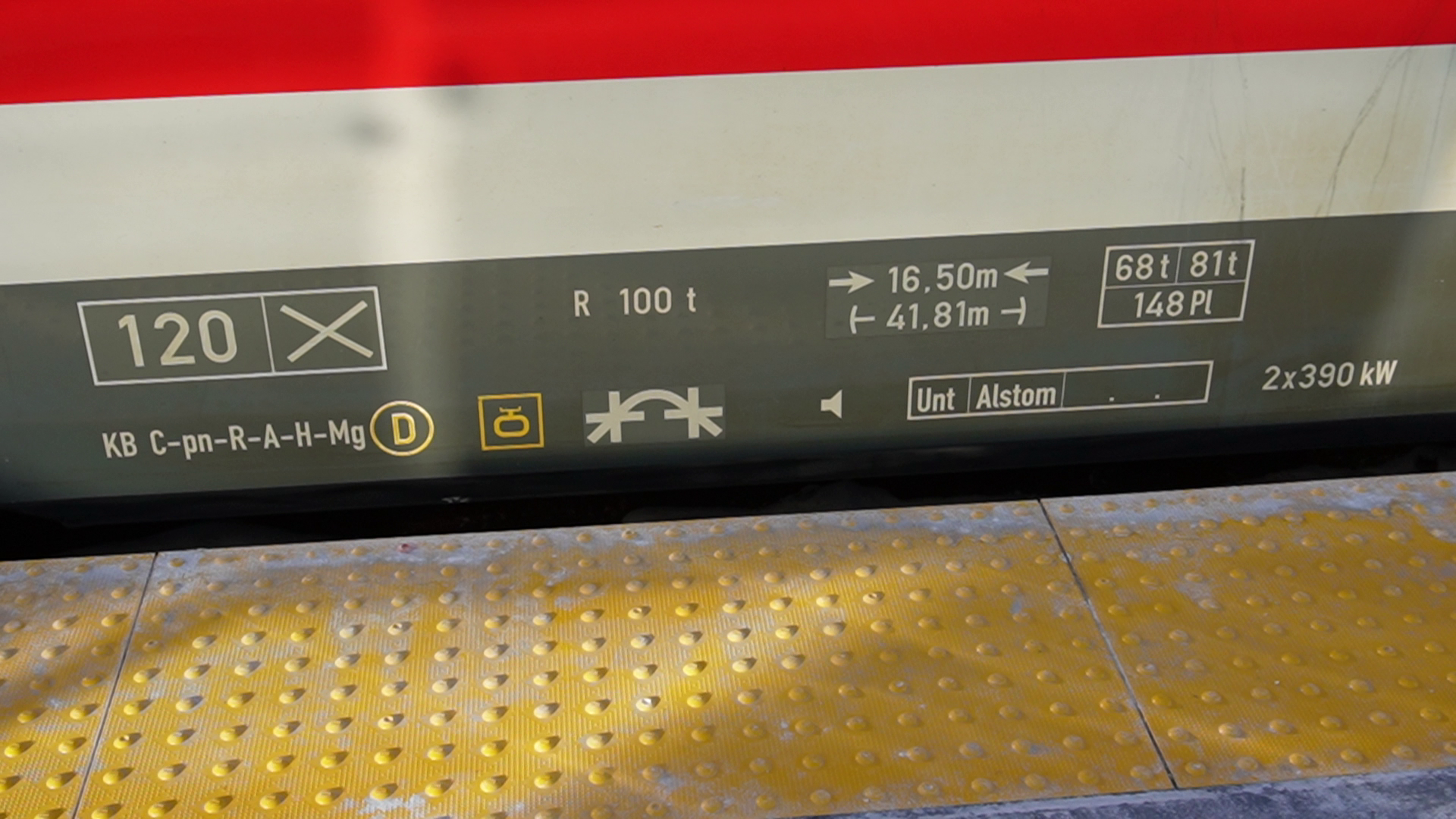
Specifications of an O-Train LINT 41 train

Both the LINT 41 and LINT 54 consist of two parts. The longer carriage length of the LINT 54 allows for an extra set of doors per carriage, whilst the LINT 41 has only one set per carriage. Some transportation companies offer ticket machines in the door area. The trainsets are equipped with diesel engines with a rated power of 315-kilowatt (422 hp), 335-kilowatt (449 hp) or 390-kilowatt (520 hp) depending on their delivery date. LINT 27 are equipped with a single engine, LINT 41 with two engines, LINT 54 with two or three engines, LINT 81 with four engines.

The trains are mainly used in Northern Germany and North Rhine-Westphalia. They are also quite popular in other European countries. For example, in Denmark they are being used by the largest non-state-owned operator, Arriva (a total of 43 units: 30 delivered in 2004–2005, 11 delivered in 2010–11 and 2 delivered in 2012) as well as by Lokalbanen A/S and Regionstog (a total of 42 units delivered in 2006–2007). In the eastern provinces of the Netherlands, they are operated by Keolis Nederland (formerly Syntus).

They are also used in Canada. Alstom delivered six new trains to operate on the O-Train Trillium Line in Ottawa. The new trains went into service on 2 March 2015, displacing the previous Bombardier Talent fleet.

In 2019 Inlandsbanan in Sweden bought 5 used LINT 41 from the Netherlands. They have been upgraded for usage on longer distances and are used for traffic in 2020.

Lint 41 has 115 seats, while the Lint 54 can have between 150 and 180 seats.

=== LINT 81 ===
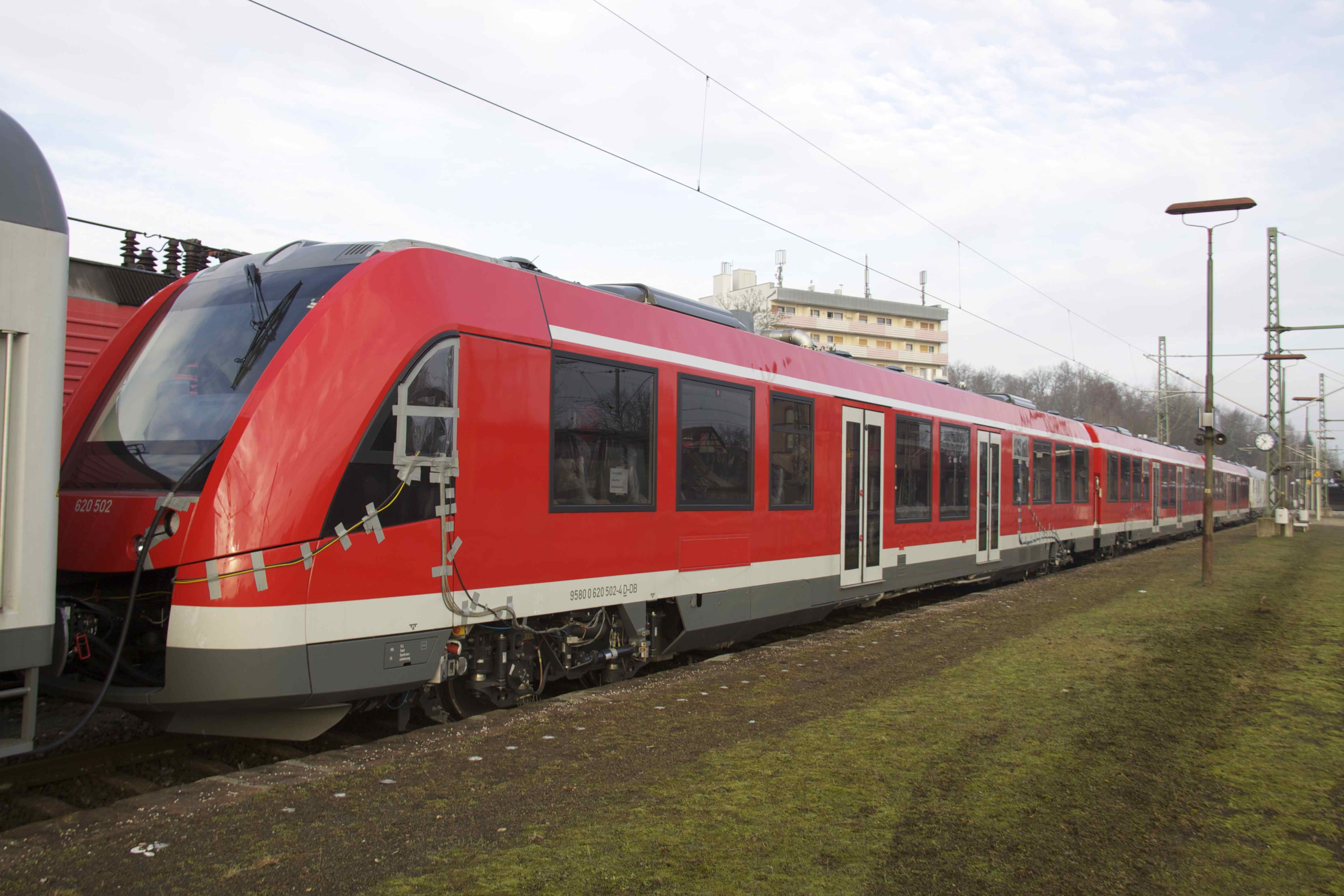
DB LINT 81 prior to entering service

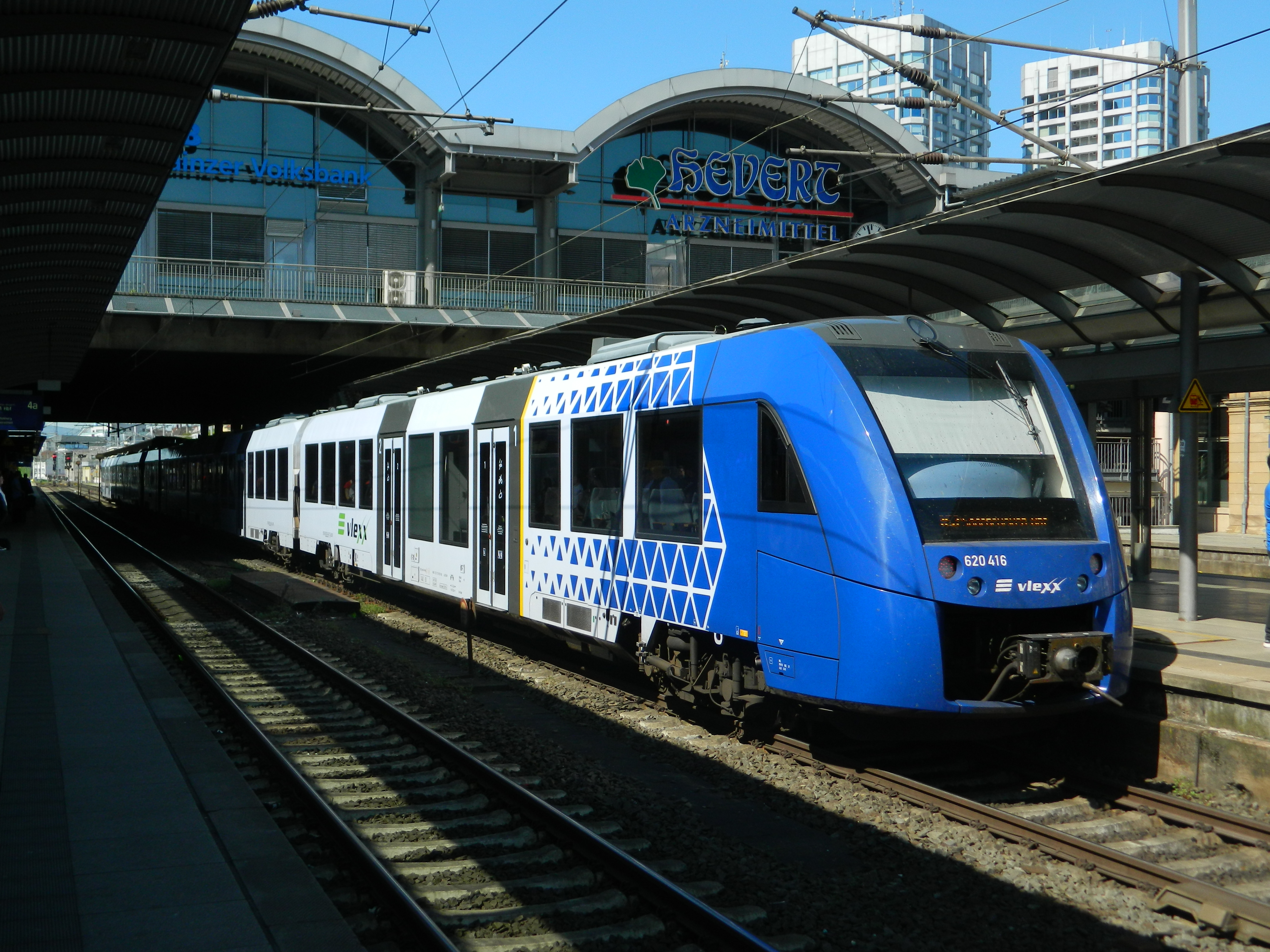
vlexx LINT 81 at Mainz Hbf

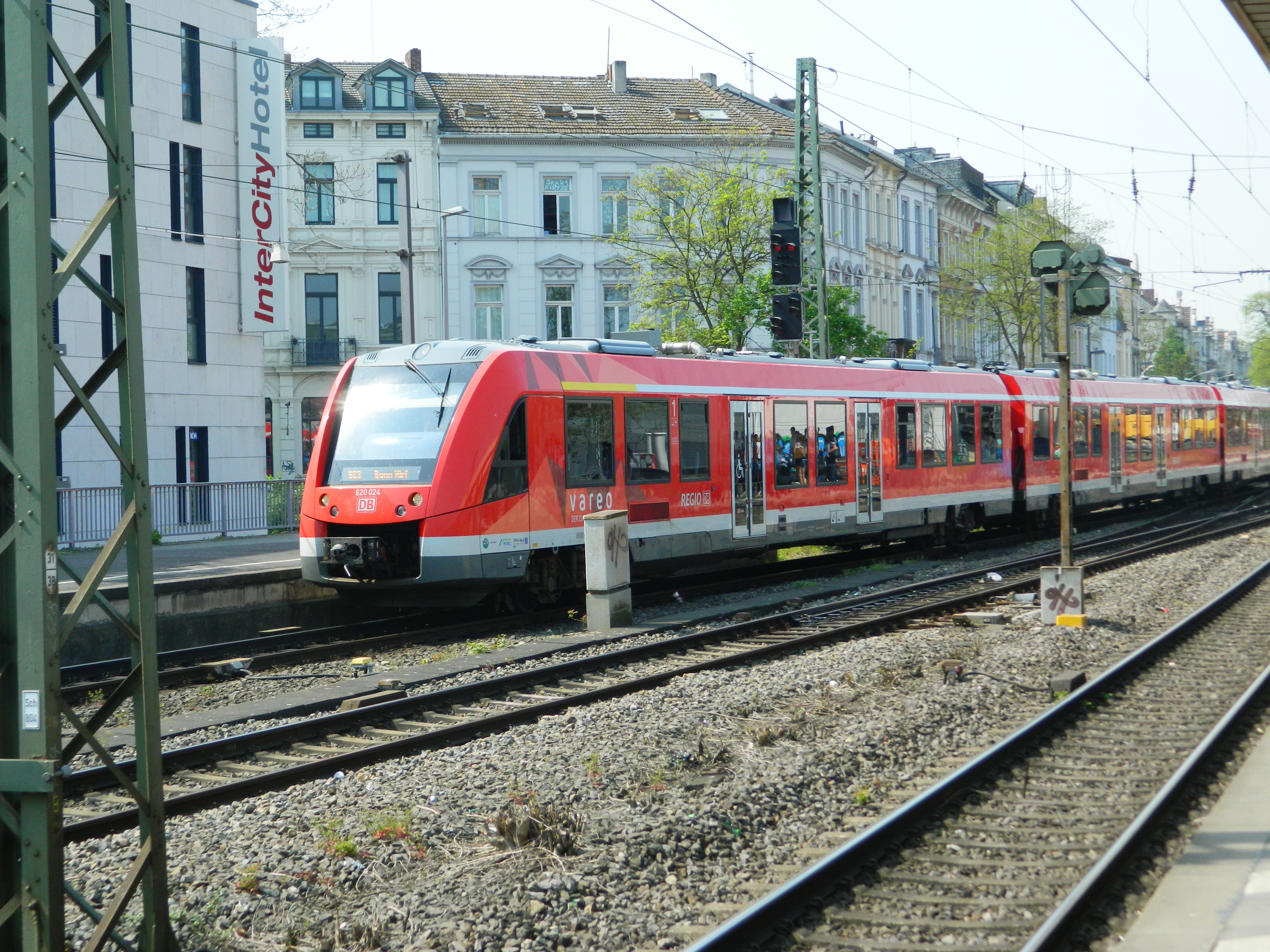
DB LINT 81 at Bonn Hbf

The LINT 81 is a three carriage set, with two driving vehicles with cabs, and an intermediate vehicle for passenger accommodation only.

In September 2012, Netinera ordered 63 Coradia LINT trains from Alstom, which would be used on services in Rhineland-Palatinate. The order included some LINT 54 DMUs (160 seats) and 18 Lint 81 (270 seats).

=== iLint ===
The Coradia iLint is a version of the Coradia Lint 54 powered by a hydrogen fuel cell. Announced at InnoTrans 2016, the new model is the world's first production hydrogen-powered trainset. The Coradia iLint is able to reach 140 kilometres per hour (87 mph) and travel 600–800 kilometres (370–500 mi) on a full tank of hydrogen. It is assembled at Alstom's Salzgitter plant. It began rolling tests at 80 km/h (50 mph) in March 2017. On 16 September 2018, the first Coradia iLint entered service on the Buxtehude-Bremervörde-Bremerhaven-Cuxhaven line in Lower Saxony, Germany. A mobile hydrogen filling station refuels the trains, but a stationary station is set to be built by 2021, along with 14 more train sets.

In 2019, Rhein-Main-Verkehrsverbund, the transit network serving the Frankfurt Rhine-Main region, ordered 27 iLint multiple-units to be delivered by December 2022. Each train will have 160 seats. The units will replace diesel trains currently plying the RB11 Frankfurt-Höchst – Bad Soden, RB12 Frankfurt – Königstein, RB15 Frankfurt – Bad Homburg – Brandoberndorf and RB16 Friedrichsdorf – Friedberg routes.

The iLint operated its first North American route as a demonstration service from Montmorency Falls to Baie-Saint-Paul in Quebec, Canada, in summer 2023.

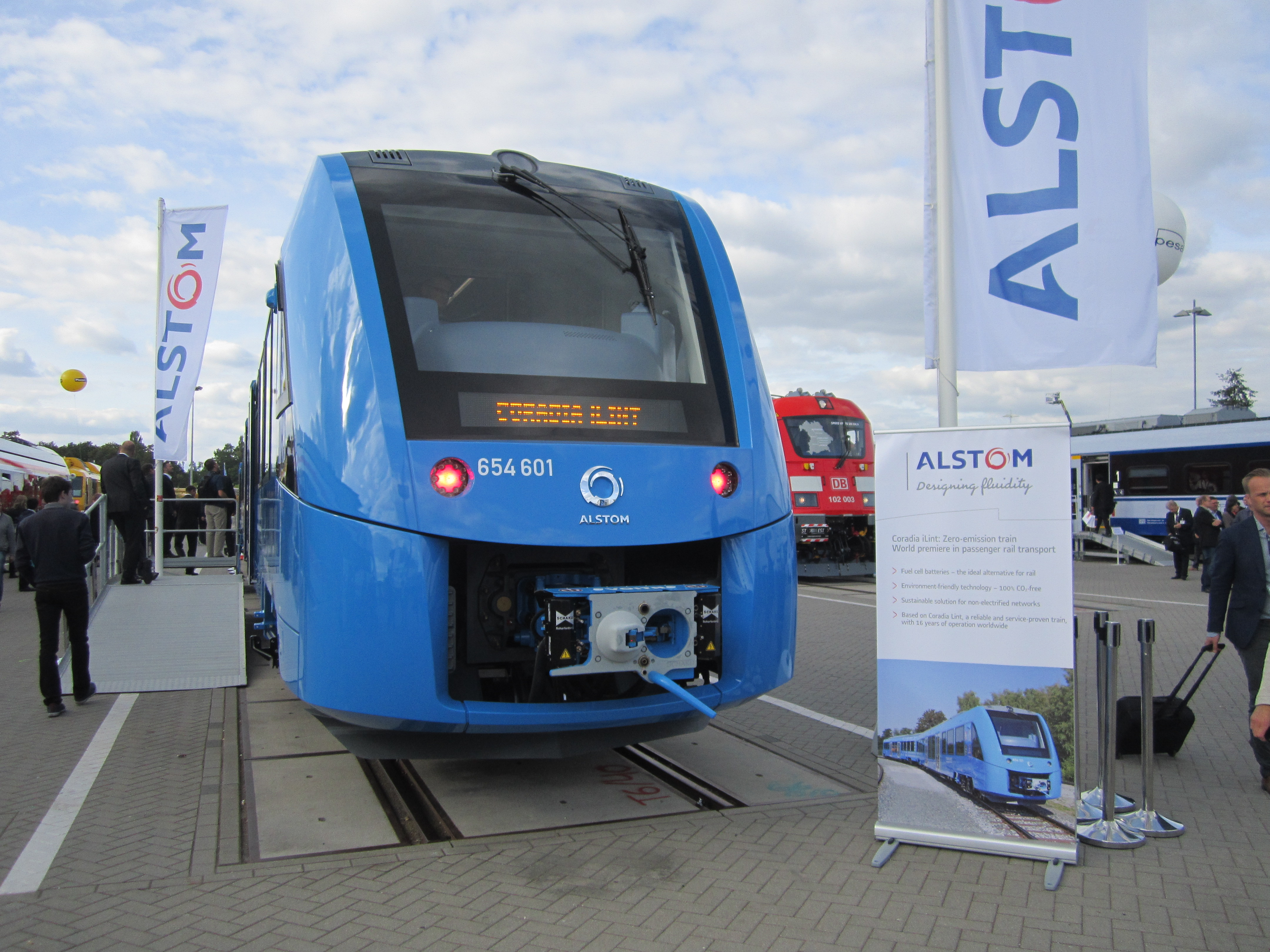
iLint

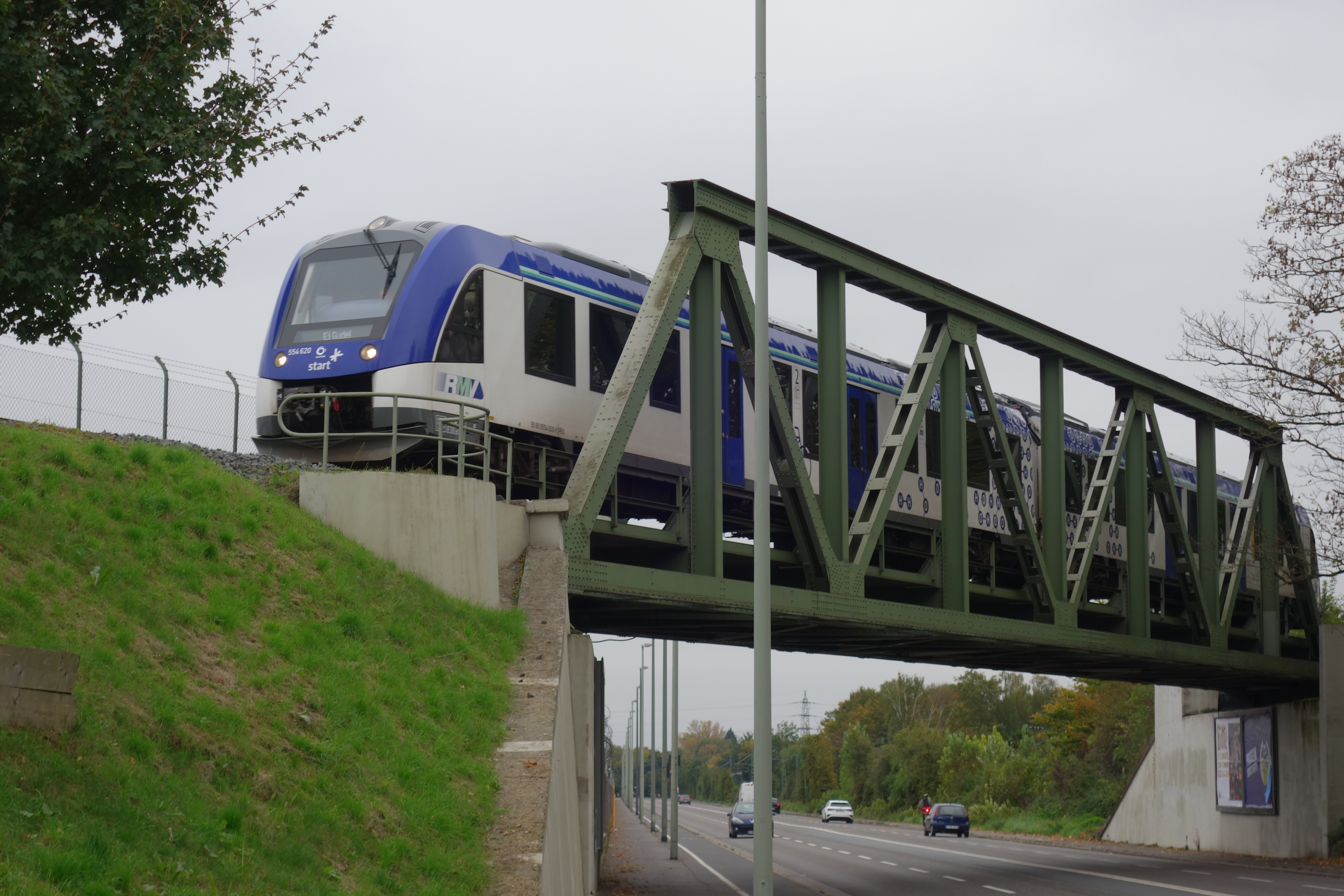
iLint of start on the way to its filling station at industrial park Höchst

== Accidents and incidents ==
On 23 April 2026, two LINTs were involved in a head-on collision between Hillerød and Kagerup, Denmark. Eighteen people were injured, five critically.

== See also ==
- DBAG Class 641
- SNCF Class X 73500

== Sources ==
- "Моторвагонные поезда Coradia компании Alstom", Железные дороги мира (in Russian) (11), 2000
- D. Klump; N. Klein (1999), "CORADIA LINT : Regionaltriebwagen von ALSTOM", Glasers Annalen (in German), 123 (9): 324–329, ISSN 0941-0589
