= Peter Erasmus Christian Kaalund =

Danish philologist

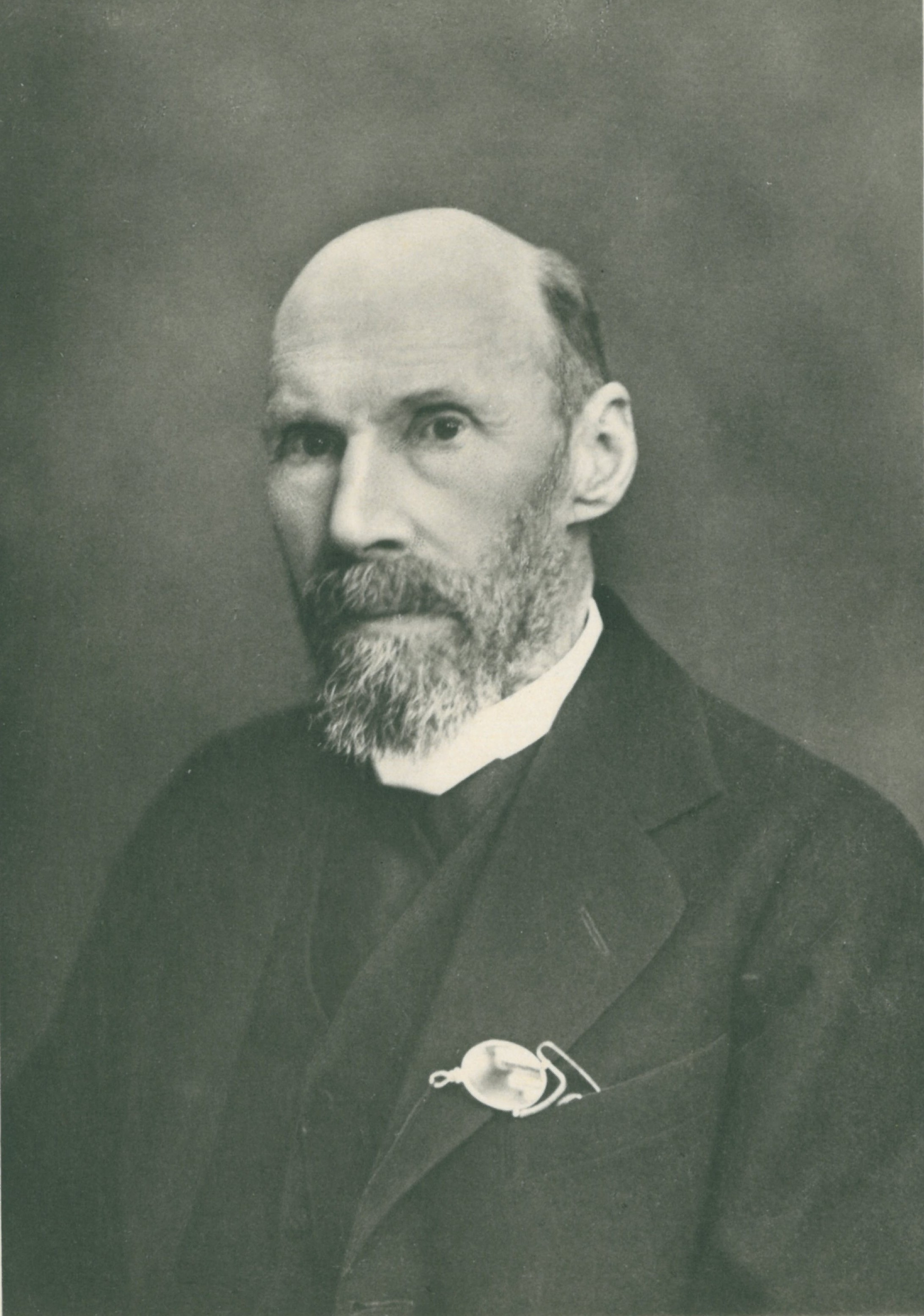
Kristian Kaalund

Peter Erasmus Christian Kaalund (19 August 1844 – 4 July 1919; also spelled Kristian or Kålund) was a Danish philologist who specialized in Scandinavian studies.

== Biography ==
Kristian Kaalund was born at Søllested on Lolland, Denmark. He became a student at the Military Academy in 1863, then went to the University of Copenhagen. He received his cand. mag. in Norse and Danish philology in 1869 and his philosophical doctorate in 1879. Between 1872 and 1874, he made a scientific trip to Iceland to study the country's topography and culture. He subsequently authored a historical-topographical description of Iceland En historisk-topografisk Beskrivelse af Island i to bind (1877–1882). He was appointed in 1883 as the main librarian of the Arnamagnæanske håndskriftsamling, the collection of Icelandic manuscripts of Árni Magnússon. In 1907 Kaalund received the Order of the Dannebrog. He died during 1919 in Frederiksberg.

== Other sources ==
- Dahlerup, Verner: Kaalund, Peter Erasmus Kristian, entry in C. F. Bricka (ed.): Dansk biografisk lexikon: tillige omfattende Norge for Tidsrummet 1537–1814; Gyldendal, Copenhagen 1887–1905; vol. IX (1895), p. 50f. URL last accessed 2007-09-16.
- Bogi Th. Melsted: Kristian Kålund (Yearbook of the Icelandic Academic Society. 1920)
