= Lersøen–Østerport Line =

Railway line in Denmark

Overview
- Status: disused

Service
- Operator(s): DSB

Technical
- Line length: 5.7 km (3.5 mi)
- Number of tracks: 1
- Track gauge: 1435 mm
- Electrification: No
- Operating speed: 60 km/h (37 mph)

The Lersøen - Østerport line is a single-track railway line between the former Lersøen freight station and Østerport station in the Danish capital Copenhagen. The line was constructed as a freight link between the Hellerup - Vigerslev line, originally opened as a freight line, and the Copenhagen - Helsingør line.

== See also ==
- List of Railway Lines in Denmark
