= Nakskov railway station =

Railway station in Nakskov, Denmark

Nakskov
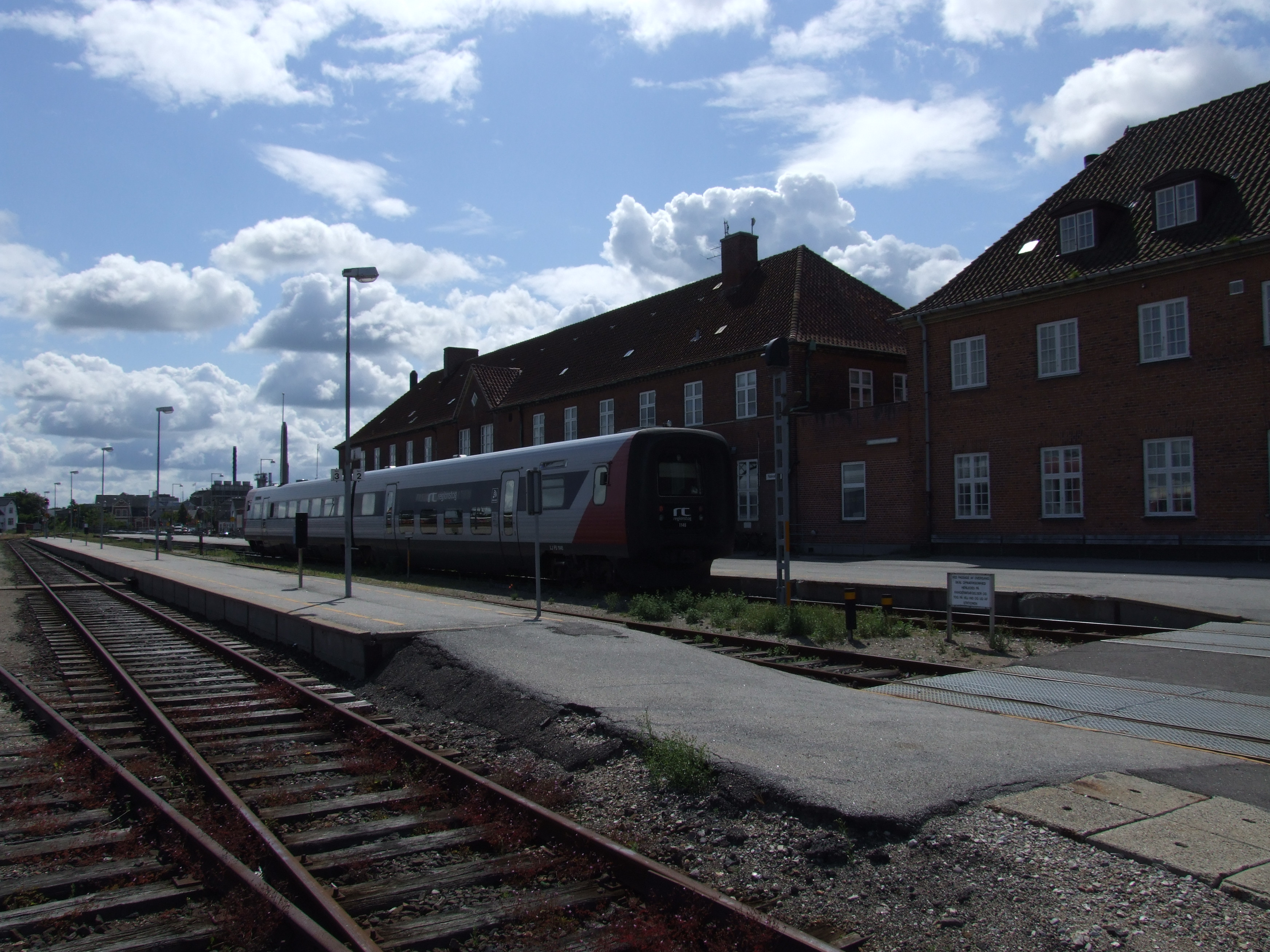
- Nakskov station in 2011

General information
- Location: Nørrevold 29; 4900 Nakskov; Lolland Municipality; Denmark
- Coordinates: 54°50′0″N 11°8′19″E
- Elevation: 3.8 metres (12 ft)
- Owner: Lokaltog
- Operator: Lokaltog
- Line: Lolland Line
- Platforms: 2
- Tracks: 3

History
- Opened: 1 July 1874
- Rebuilt: 1925

Services
Preceding station	Lokaltog	Following station
Avnede towards Nykøbing Falster	Lolland Line Local train	Terminus
Location

Nakskov railway station (Danish: Nakskov Station or Nakskov Banegård) is a railway station serving the town of Nakskov on the island of Lolland, Denmark.

The station is the western terminus of the Lollandsbanen railway line from Nykøbing Falster to Nakskov. The station opened in 1874 and its current station building was built in 1925. The train services are currently operated by the railway company Lokaltog which run frequent local train services between Nakskov and Nykøbing Falster with onward connections from there to the rest of Denmark.

== History ==
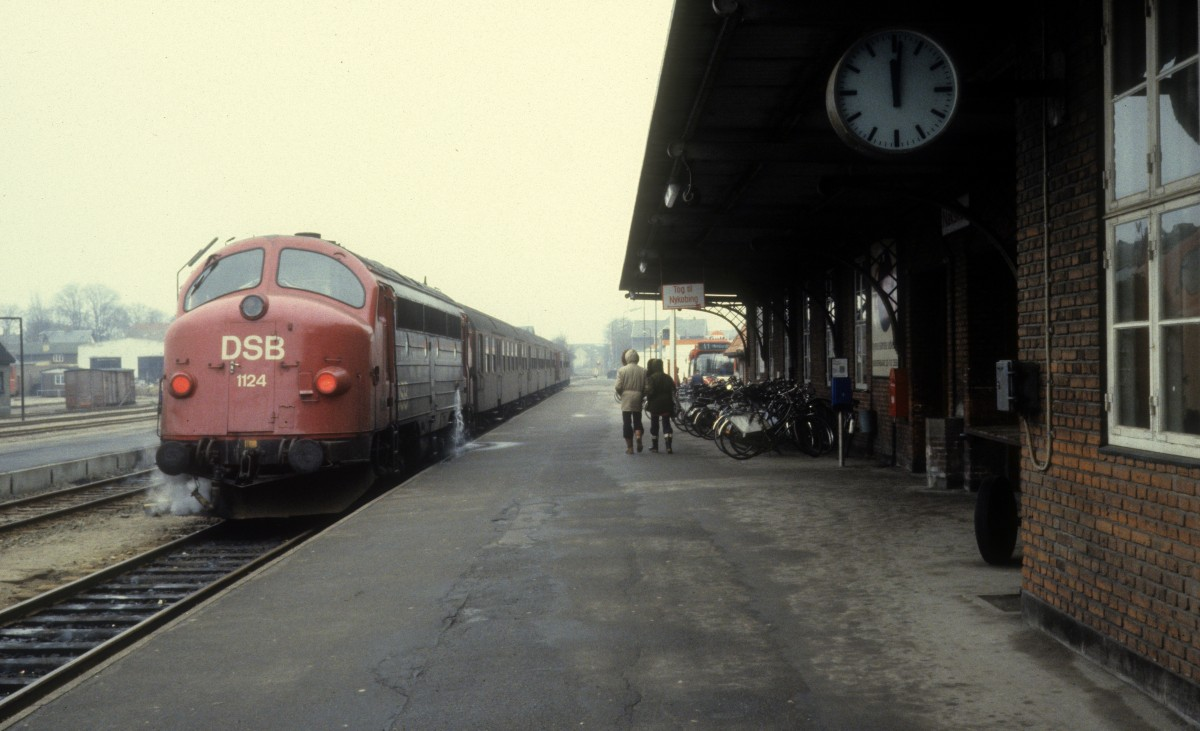
DSB train at Nakskov station in 1982.

The station opened on 1 July 1874 to serve as the terminus of the new Lollandsbanen railway line across the island of Lolland from Nykøbing Falster to Nakskov via Maribo. The following year, the first railway bridge across the Guldborgsund strait was inaugurated, and the Lolland Line was connected to the Falster Railway at the railway station in Nykøbing Falster.

Nakskov station was also the terminus of the Nakskov–Kragenæs railway line from 1915 to 1967, and of the Nakskov–Rødby railway line from 1926 to 1953.

Until 2008, an industrial track connected Nakskov station with the Port of Nakskov.

== Architecture ==
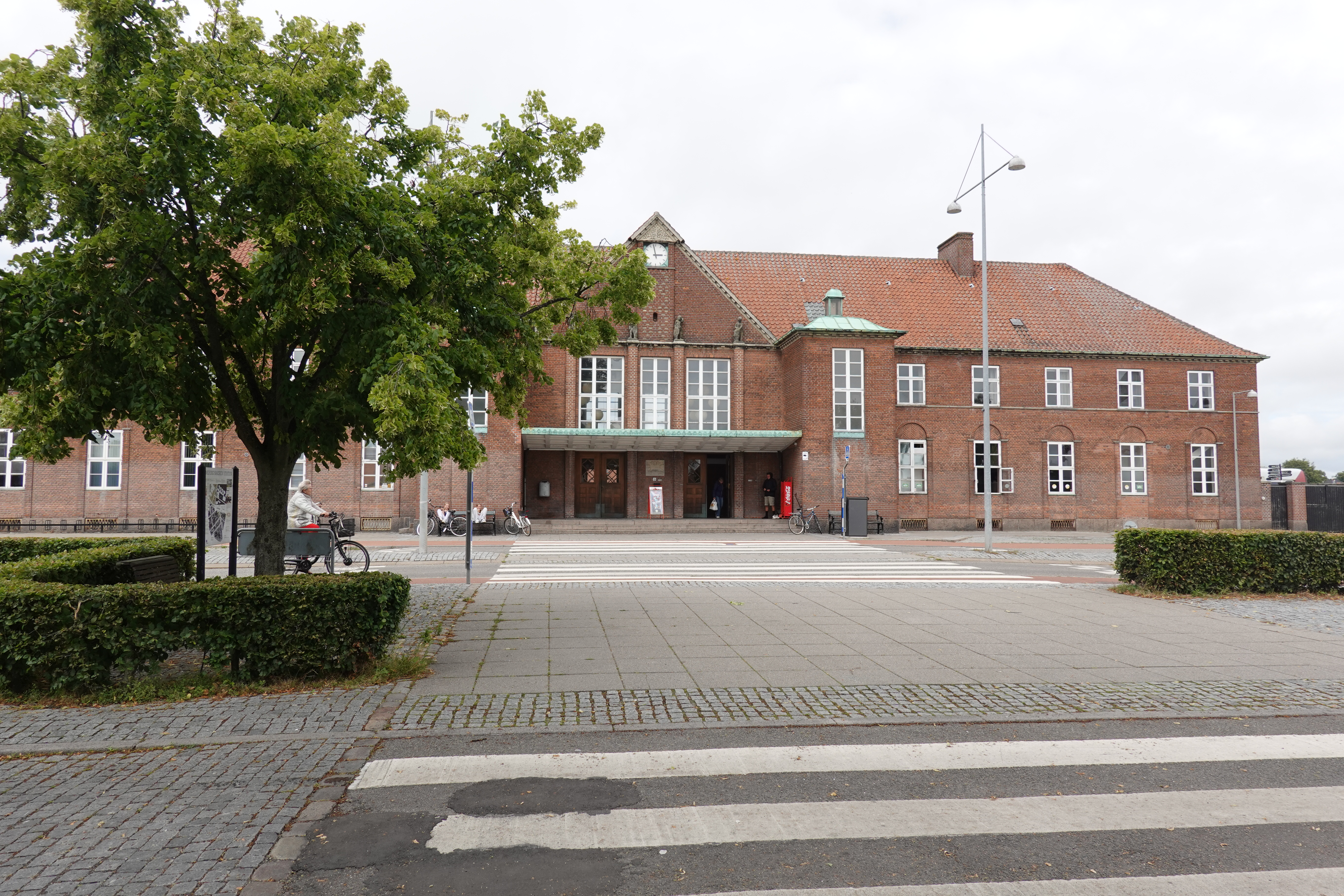
Street facade of the station building in 2024.

The second and still existing station building from 1925 was built to designs by the Danish architect Adolph Einar Hansen Ørnsholt.

== Operations ==
=== Train services ===
The train services are currently operated by the regional railway company Lokaltog which run frequent local train services from Nakskov station to Nykøbing Falster station with onward connections from Nykøbing Falster to the rest of Denmark.

== See also ==
- List of railway stations in Denmark
- Rail transport in Denmark
