= Lokalbanen =

Danish railway company

Lokalbanen A/S
- Type: Aktieselskab
- Founded: 2001
- Defunct: 2015
- Headquarters: Hillerød, Denmark
- Area served: Denmark
- Services: Passenger transportation
- Website: www.lokalbanen.dk

Lokalbanen A/S (The Local Railway, abbreviated LB) was a Danish railway company responsible for train operation and related passenger services on five local railways north of Copenhagen, Denmark. The company was formed in 2001, and merged with Regionstog A/S in 2015 to form the railway company Lokaltog A/S.

== History ==
Owned by the Greater Copenhagen Authority (HUR), Lokalbanen was established in 2001 following HUR's acquisition of the share of the railway lines previously owned by the Danish state. The company headquarters were located in Hillerød; the company also had offices in various stations on the lines it operates.

Lokalbanen operated on the lines formerly controlled by Frederiksværkbanen (HFHJ), Gribskovbanen (GDS), Hornbækbanen (HHGB), Nærumbanen (LNJ) and Østbanen (ØSJS), from which it took over operation in May 2002. All companies were subsequently closed. Ownership of the trains and infrastructure from the companies is now the responsibility of Hovedstadens Lokalbaner (HL), from which Lokalbanen leased its trains; all HL lines were run by LB.

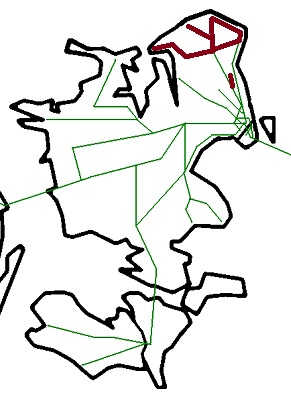
Map showing Lokalbanen lines in brown.

== Railway lines ==
Railway line	Termini	Length	No. of stations
Frederiksværk Line	Hillerød-Hundested	36.3 km	16
Gribskov Line	Hillerød-Tisvilde/Gilleleje	25 km	19
Hornbæk Line	Helsingør-Gilleleje	25 km	19
Lille Nord	Hillerød-Helsingør	20.8 km	9
Nærum Line	Jægersborg-Nærum	7.8 km	9

== See also ==
- Rail transport in Denmark
- Hovedstadens Lokalbaner
