= East Line (Denmark) =

Local railway in the eastern part of Zealand

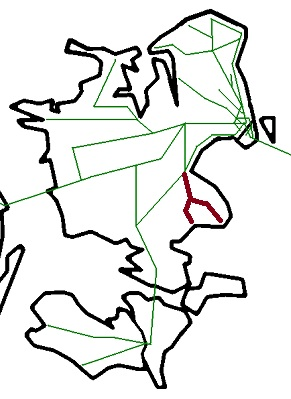
- Map of rail lines in eastern Denmark, with the East Line marked in brown

Overview
- Native name: Østbanen
- Stations: 15

Service
- Type: Local railway
- Services: 2
- Rolling stock: Alstom Coradia LINT

History
- Opened: 1 July 1879

Technical
- Line length: 49.6 km (30.8 mi)
- Number of tracks: single
- Track gauge: 1,435 mm (4 ft 8 1/2 in)
- Operating speed: 100 km/h

The East Line (Danish: Østbanen) is a local railway line in the eastern part of Zealand, Denmark. The railway started operations on 1 July 1879. It is today part of Lokaltog, a railway company operating nine local railways on the islands of Zealand, Lolland and Falster.

Since December 2020, trains have run every 30 minutes between Roskilde and Faxe Ladeplads via Køge and Hårlev. There are also connecting services from Hårlev to Rødvig with a 3-5 minute connection time. The journey time from Roskilde to Faxe Ladeplads is 68 minutes.

== History ==
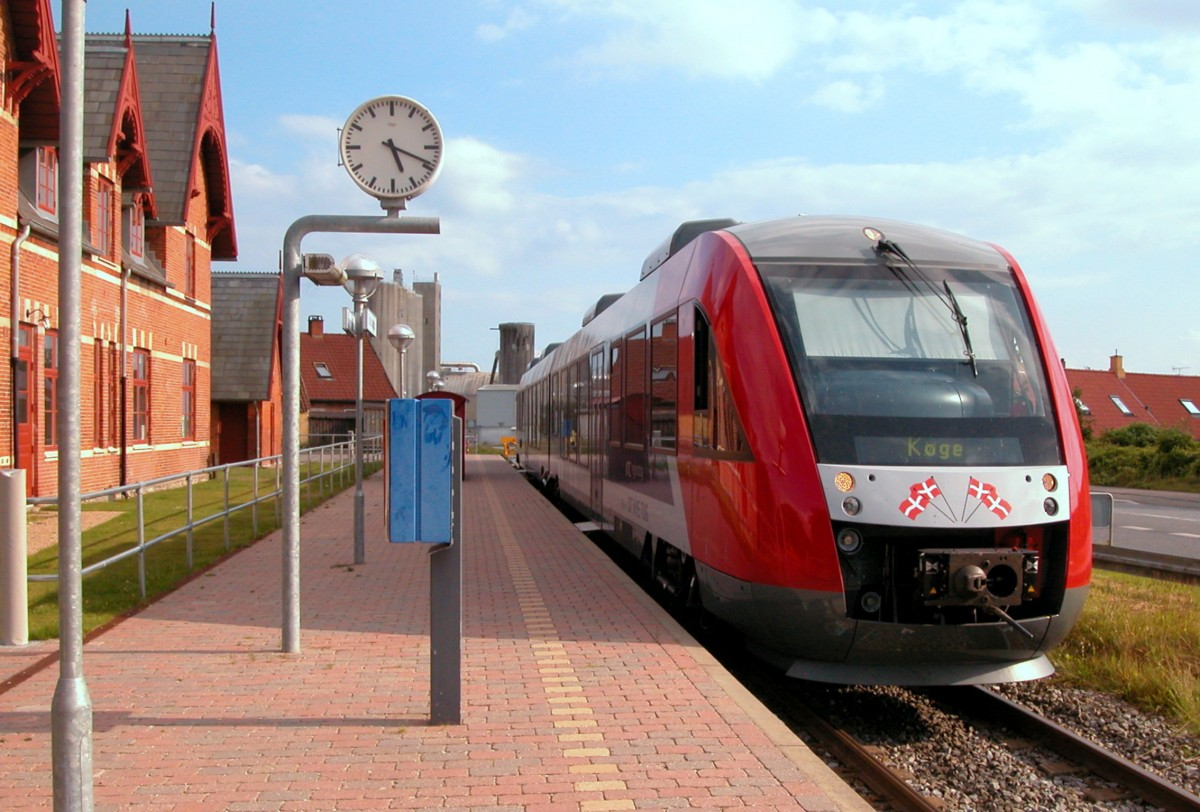
LINT 41 train at Faxe Ladeplads

The stations of Himlingøje, Lille Linde, and Tokkerup are outside of their respective villages, and it is even further between Faxe South and Faxe and from Vallø to Vallø Castle. In addition to the termini, trains can pass at Egøje, Vallø, Grubberholm, Klippinge, Hårlev, Karise and Store Heddinge; Faxe South has a short siding, the remaining line is single track and without electrification.

All of the station buildings on the line were designed by architect Heinrich Wenck.

Since 2009 Alstom Coradia LINT 41 trains have been in use. In 2020, the rail infrastructure was reaching the end of its lifetime and there were political discussions about converting Østbanen into a guided busway. In June 2021 a majority in the Danish Parliament voted for an infrastructure agreement securing the future of Østbanen as a railway. The track renovations were completed in September 2024.
