= Else-Marie Boyhus =

Danish food historian

- Born: 1935 (age 90–91); Nykøbing Falster, Denmark
- Occupation: Food historian
- Years active: 1963-present

Else-Marie Boyhus (born 1935) is a Danish food historian. Her research has focused on her country's cooking and food production throughout history. In addition to publishing about the history of food, she has managed several museums and served as the chair of the Danish Museum Board (Statens Museumsnævn). She is a member of the Danish Gastronomic Academy (Danske Gastronomiske Akademi) and co-editor of the academy's gastronomic lexicon.

== Early life and education ==
Else-Marie Boyhus was born in 1935 in Nykøbing Falster, Denmark, to Sørine (née Skøtt) and Tage Mikkelsen Boyhus. Her father worked as a civil servant for the county council. By the time she was entering her teens, Boyhus knew she wanted to study history and her parents encouraged her choice. In 1954, she matriculated in modern languages from Nykøbing Cathedral School and began studying history at the University of Copenhagen. During her studies, she worked at the National Museum of Denmark from 1955 to 1961, serving on the editorial staff of the journal Danmarks Kirker (Danish Churches). Boyhus married Finn Ragn-Hansen, a history professor at the Maribo Gymnasium, in 1958. In 1963, she earned a master's degree (mag.art) in history, becoming one of the first generation of women university graduates to curate museums and lecture on preservation of the history of local life. She was a pioneering food historian in Denmark.

== Career ==
While still a student, in 1963 Boyhus was hired to manage and serve as a museum inspector at the Lolland-Falsters Stiftsmuseum og Frilandsmuseet in Maribo. In curating exhibits, she focused on women and the daily life of local people. Some of those exhibits examined life during the Occupation of Denmark in World War II and the production of sugar beets, including their agricultural importance, working conditions, and how those impacted women's lives. She was the first chair appointed to organize the work of the Statens Museumsnævn (Danish Museum Board), when it was founded in 1977, and served until 1981. One of her tasks was to support decentralization efforts to allow local museums greater autonomy. Internationally, she served as a delegate to the Danish UNESCO commission between 1976 and 1989 and as part of the UNESCO intergovernmental committee to return cultural artifacts to their original country from 1979 to 1988. She became a member of the Danish Gastronomic Academy in 1987.

In 1989, Boyhus left the museum and began teaching at the Krogerup Folk High School. After three years, she began serving as the editor of the magazine Højskolebladet and edited it until 1997. Simultaneously, she served as a member of the Danish organization Rådet for Europæisk Politik (Council for European Politics) from 1993 to 1997. Since 1997, Boyhus has worked as a freelance writer. Beginning in 1998, she served as co-editor of Denmark's Gastronomic Lexicon published by Gyldendal for the Gastronomic Academy. She has been honored for her scholarly work by numerous awards, including the Golden Garter, bestowed by the scientific journal Skalk in 1976; the artist's award from the Ole Haslund Artist Foundation in 1979; the Egholt Foundation Prize for public information on culture in 1988; the Landbrugets Kulturpris (Agricultural Culture Prize) in 1994; and the Nonfiction Prize of the Danish Writers' Association in 1996.

== Research ==
Boyhus began publishing scholarly works evaluating food and its cultural history around 1970. Some of her early works evaluated agricultural production on the islands of Lolland and Falster and the importance of sugar beets to the economy. With works like Det åbne ildsteds mad (Food from the Open Hearth) and Traditionsrige retter (Dishes Rich in Tradition), she moved away from farming and production and began publishing works on the history of Danish gastronomic development. Analyzing why certain foods are eaten, according to Boyhus, brings an understanding of changes in knowledge on nutrition, health issues, food politicies, and economic concerns, which shape cultural values.

Boyhus has analyzed Danish food customs from the seventeenth century. Trying out old recipes, she had to convert weights and measures to modern standards, as for example, eggs in the past were smaller than they are today. Her works examine not only cooking, but society and its relationship with food. Among her discoveries were that ground meat, prior to the invention of grinders, was reserved for wealthy people who could afford someone to prepare it and that the national dish, frikadeller (Danish meat balls), originated in Italy. Her major work Historisk Kogebog (Historical Cookbook) was published in 2013. In 2014, she and her body of work were honored with the Academic Food Communication Award by the networking group Mad+Medier, an organization with members from throughout the food and drink industry, including cookbook authors, food bloggers and stylists, journalists, food photographers, manufacturing companies, and trade members in various aspects of the food industry.

== Selected works ==
- Boyhus, Else-Marie (1973). Sukkerroer, 100 år på Lolland-Falster [Sugar Beets, 100 Years in Lolland-Falster] (in Danish). Maribo: Lollands-Postens Bogtrykkeri. OCLC 1289773085.
- Boyhus, Else-Marie (1976). Det åbne ildsteds mad [The Food of the Open Hearth] (in Danish). Højbjerg: Wormianum. OCLC 8785160466.
- Boyhus, Else-Marie (1977). Traditionsrige retter [Traditional Dishes] (in Danish) (2nd ed.). Århus: Wormianum. OCLC 256556516.
- Boyhus, Else-Marie (1984). Sukkerfabriken Nykøbing 1884–1984 [Nykøbing Sugar Factory 1884–1984] (in Danish). Nykøbing: Sukkerfabriken Nykøbing. OCLC 463725301.
- Boyhus, Else-Marie (1996). Grønsager — en køkkenhistorie [Vegetables — A Kitchen Story] (in Danish). Copenhagen: Gyldendal. OCLC 60950933.
- Boyhus, Else-Marie (1998). Grisen: en køkkenhistorie [The Pig: A Kitchen Story] (PDF) (in Danish) (1 ed.). Copenhagen: Gyldendal. ISBN 978-87-00-35258-2.
- Boyhus, Else-Marie (2002). "Kogekunst og kogebøger, fem eksempler 1581-1793" [Cookery and Cookery Books, Five Examples 1581–1793]. Bol og By (in Danish) (2). Odense: Landbohistorisk Selskab. ISSN 0900-7334.
- Boyhus, Else-Marie. "Rugbrød Og Danmarkshistorie.[Rye Bread and the Danish History]." Denmark: Schulstad’s Newsletter (2005).
- Boyhus, Else-Marie (2013). Historisk kogebog: kogekunst i Danmark 1616–1910 [Historical Cookbook: Cookery in Denmark 1616–1910] (in Danish) (1 ed.). Højbjerg: Wormianum. ISBN 978-87-89531-42-7.
