= Prenter =

Prenter is a surname. Notable people with the surname include:

- Harriet Dunlop Prenter, leader in the women's rights movement in Canada
- Regin Prenter (1907–1990), Danish Lutheran priest and theologian
- Robert Prenter (born 1965), California State Assemblyman
