= Maribo Open-Air Museum =

Museum on Lolland, Denmark

Coordinates: 54°46′14″N 11°29′23″E

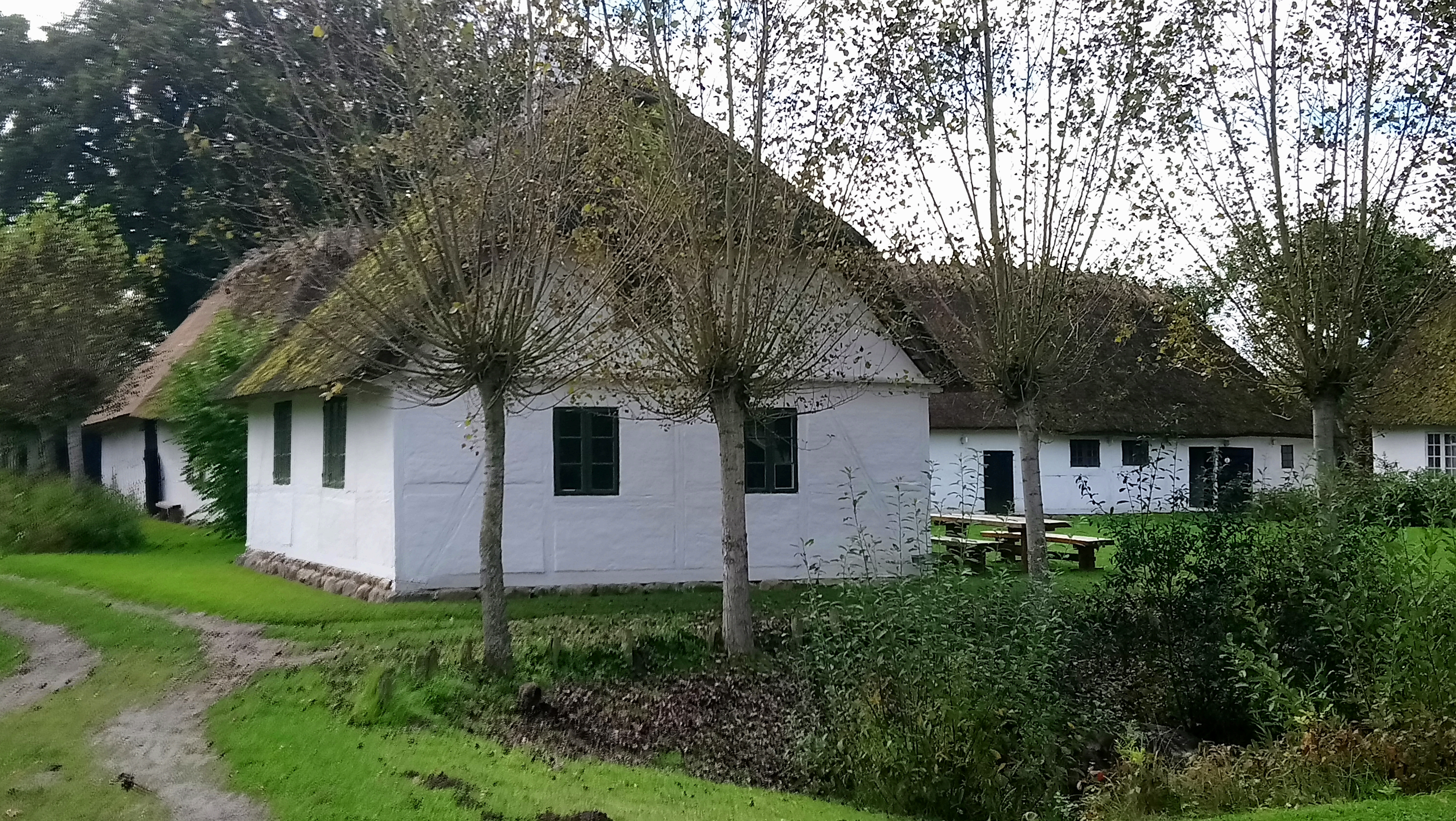

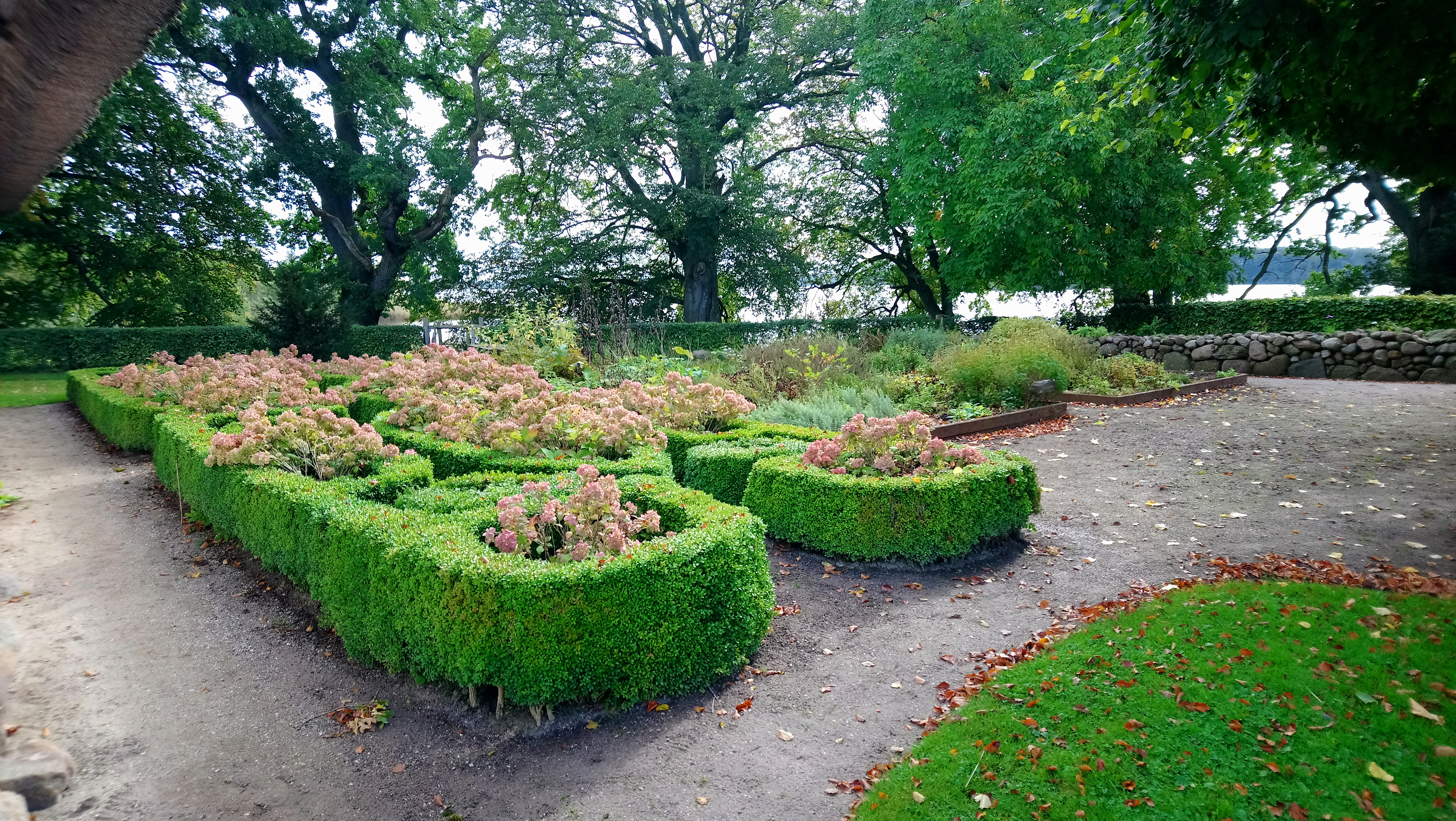

Maribo Open-Air Museum (Danish: Frilandsmuseet i Maribo) is a museum located on the western outskirts of Maribo on the Danish island of Lolland. It is located 1 kilometre (0.62 mi) from Torvet, to the west of the Maribo Sø Camping site and oak woodland, near the northern banks of Søndersø Lake. It is the third oldest open-air museum in Denmark, and is in the backdrop of the Maribo Lakes Nature Park. Located on Meinckesvej, Maribo, the museum is open to visitors from 1 May to 30 September every day except Monday from 10 am to 4 pm.

== Description ==
Opened in 1927, the museum provides a picture of village life in Lolland and Falster in the 19th century. The museum consists of 13 individual houses from the 17th to the 20th centuries, each illustrating how rustic people of different professions lived and worked in former times, and thus expose to the public the ancient building traditions. The ancient houses are from Lolland and Falster, and also 20 farms and houses from Funen. Aside from the farm cottages, there is also a windmill, dairy and a school, as well as a fire station and smithy. In the smithy, traditional demonstrations of the craft are conducted for visitors. The school, Christiansminde School, was originally built in 1817 and extended in 1828. It ceased function as a school in 1904 and became a museum in 1939. Also on display are various furnishings and domestic items and equipment from rural areas of Sjaelland. The 19th-century farmstead in the museum are six houses, a smithy, mill, and school and also herbal plants. The museum has a steam engine which was once located at Nysted Sawmill and a harvester from 1872 which was used to plow the fields. The museum has various gardens including a rose garden, kitchen garden and a garden of medicinal plants, with games scattered about for play. There is also a gift shop and a picnic area for visitors.

Each of the various houses in the museum have an interesting background.

=== Ane Huggemand's house ===
Acquired by the museum in 1925, the farmhand's cottage was originally on the estate belonging to Halsted Priory. The last occupant was Ane Huggemand who lived there for 85 years. The farmhand's wife worked at Halsted Manor, looking after the children while her husband worked on the estate. The little kitchen with its fireplace stands next to the living room where the family also slept at night. A small pantry can be seen at the back. The large room to the right of the kitchen could also be heated.

=== Falster farmhouse ===
The four-winged farmhouse was brought from Nørre Ørslev in 1931. Furnished in accordance with rural traditions, it is typical of a 17th-century farm. The oldest part is the stable which was originally also residential. The outhouses also store carts, threshing equipment and tools. The central room in the farmhouse was used for living, eating and sleeping. The large drawing room was only used on festive occasions. The kitchen has a large open fireplace which was used for cooking.

=== Godsted house ===
The little farm workers' house from Godsted was rebuilt at the museum in 2006. Dating from 1872, it originally stood on the Ulkiksdal estate. It was used by a variety of farm hands from gardeners and cart drivers to sugar beet pickers from Sweden and Poland. The main difference with the older houses is the iron stove in the kitchen rather than an open fire.

=== Curate's residence ===
The curate's section originally formed part of the three-winged rectory at Christianssæde which probably dates from the second half of the 15th century. When it was brought to the museum for the opening in 1927, substantial rebuilding had to be undertaken to restore it to its original state. There was no open fire in the kitchen as the curate ate with the priest and his family. The interior furnishings are currently being brought in line with those used in the 1720s. The roof was rethatched in 2009.

=== Barn ===
The barn was originally part of the farm now known as Gammel Skovnæs which was built around 1860. The only brick building in the museum, it has doors at both ends allowing a cart to be driven into one end, unloaded, and out the other end. Its size shows how profitable grain farming was in the second half of the 19th century. The steam engine from Nysted Sawmill is housed in the barn.

=== Village smithy ===
The early 17th-century smithy was brought to the museum from Majbølle in northeastern Lolland in 1927. The half-timbered building has a tiled roof rather than thatch which could easily have been set alight by the blacksmith's fire. Demonstrations of ironworking can often be seen inside the smithy.

=== Malt kiln ===
The malt house was brought to the museum from Vester Ulslev in 1925. The interior was reconstructed with assistance from the original owner. Beer was an important component of the fare of the farm at a time when water was often unfit to drink and meals tended to be repetitive. Malt had to be dried carefully as it contributed to the taste of the beer. A malt kiln could be placed above the fireplace inside the farmhouse but presented a fire hazard. As a result separate malt houses or kilns were built like the one in the museum.

=== Skovpavillonen ===
The Skovpalillon or forest retreat just outside the museum enclosure was built in 1853 as a leisure facility for the local population where they could play skittles and hold festivities with fireworks and even rides in an air balloon. In 1867, however, it was converted into a dairy for the milk from the local farm's 80 cows. From 1894, it was used to house seasonal laborers from Sweden and Poland who worked in the sugar beet fields. Before it was taken over by the museum in 1960, it had also served as a granary.

=== Skovridergården ===
The large half-timbered building known as Skovridergården came from Vantore near Nysted. Dating from the late 1650s, it has been substantially modified over the years. When the curator was offered the building for the museum in 1924, he was uncertain about what he should do with it and where it should be placed. Rather than refitting it as a riding pavilion, its original function, for years it was furnished as a rural cottage. Since the 1970s, it has served as the museum's shop and café.

=== Fejø Windmill ===
The old postmill once stood on the island of Fejø off Lolland's north coast. It had served three generations from 1833 to 1921. First documented in 1816, it could well go back to the end of the 15th century. The windmill was fully restored in 2011.

=== Christiansminde School ===
Originally located at Langet on Lolland, the long, white building was completed in 1817 and extended in 1828. It was one of the ten new schools built by the social reformer Christian Ditlev Frederik Reventlow with a curriculum which included gymnastics, natural history, music, geography and history. The schoolteacher's living quarters are located at one end of the building while the classroom area has large windows providing plenty of light. Reventlow believed children would benefit from the light and air, a real contrast with their dimly-lit, rather stuffy homes.

== Gallery ==
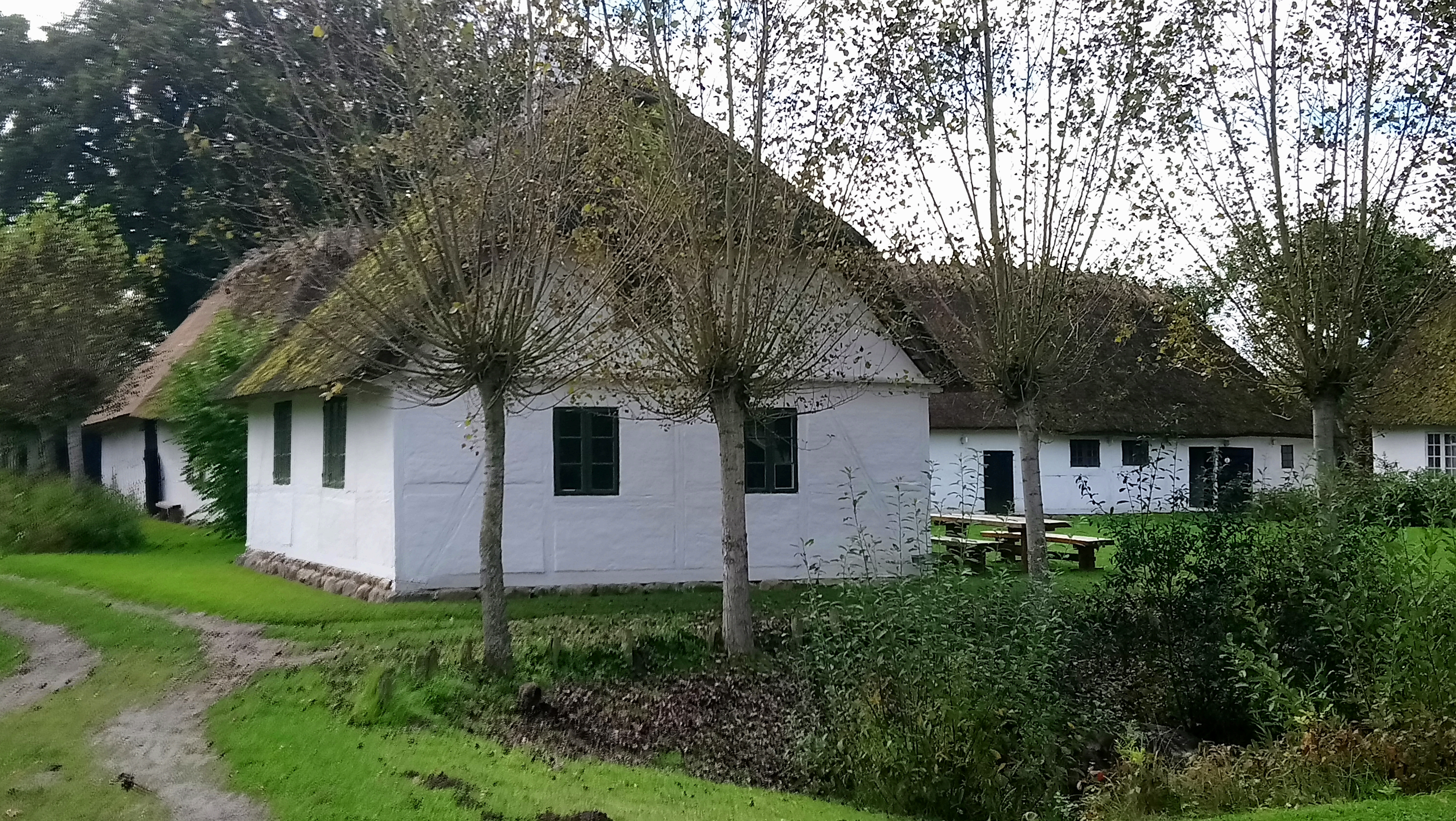
Godsted house

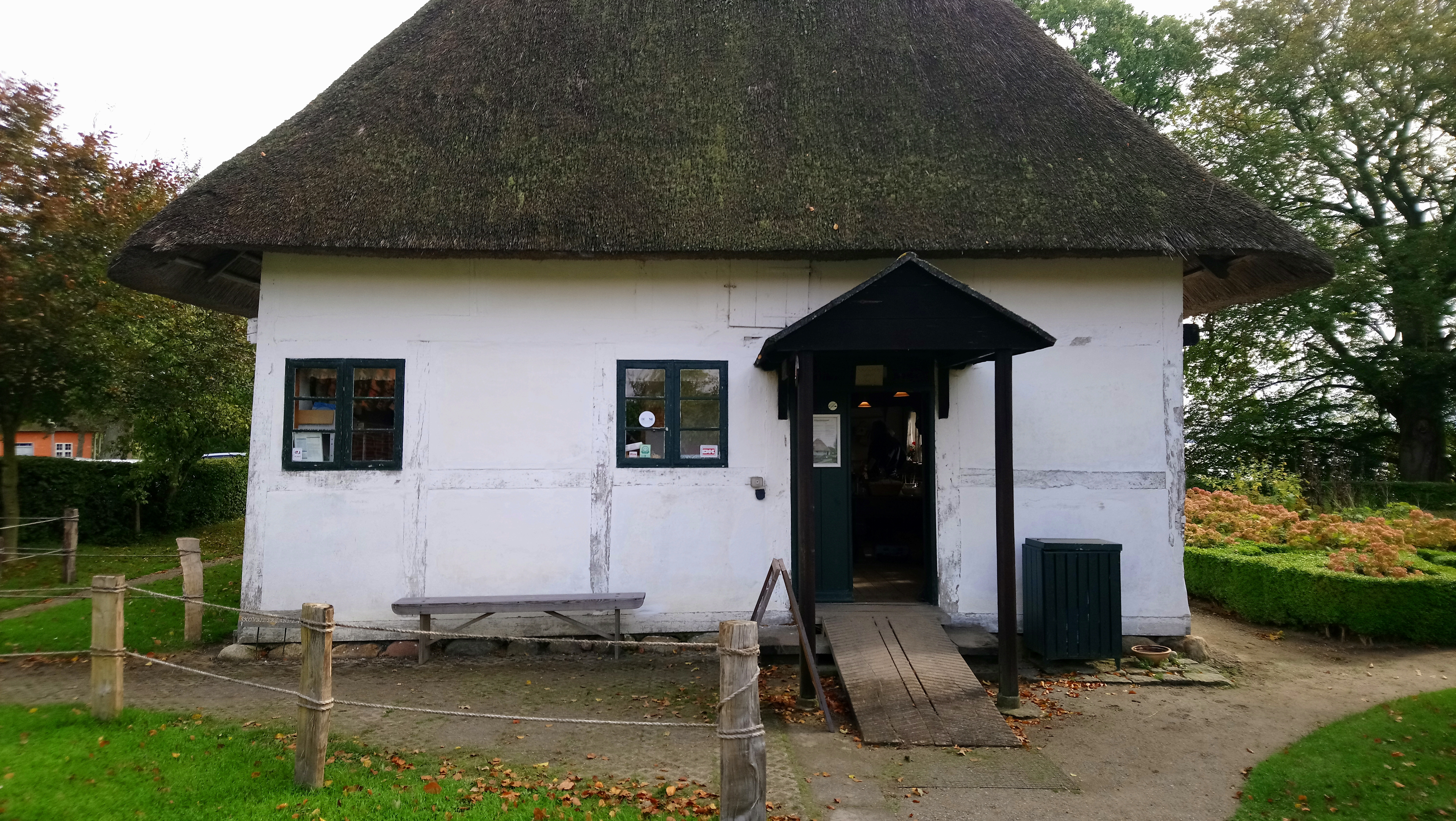
Skovridergården

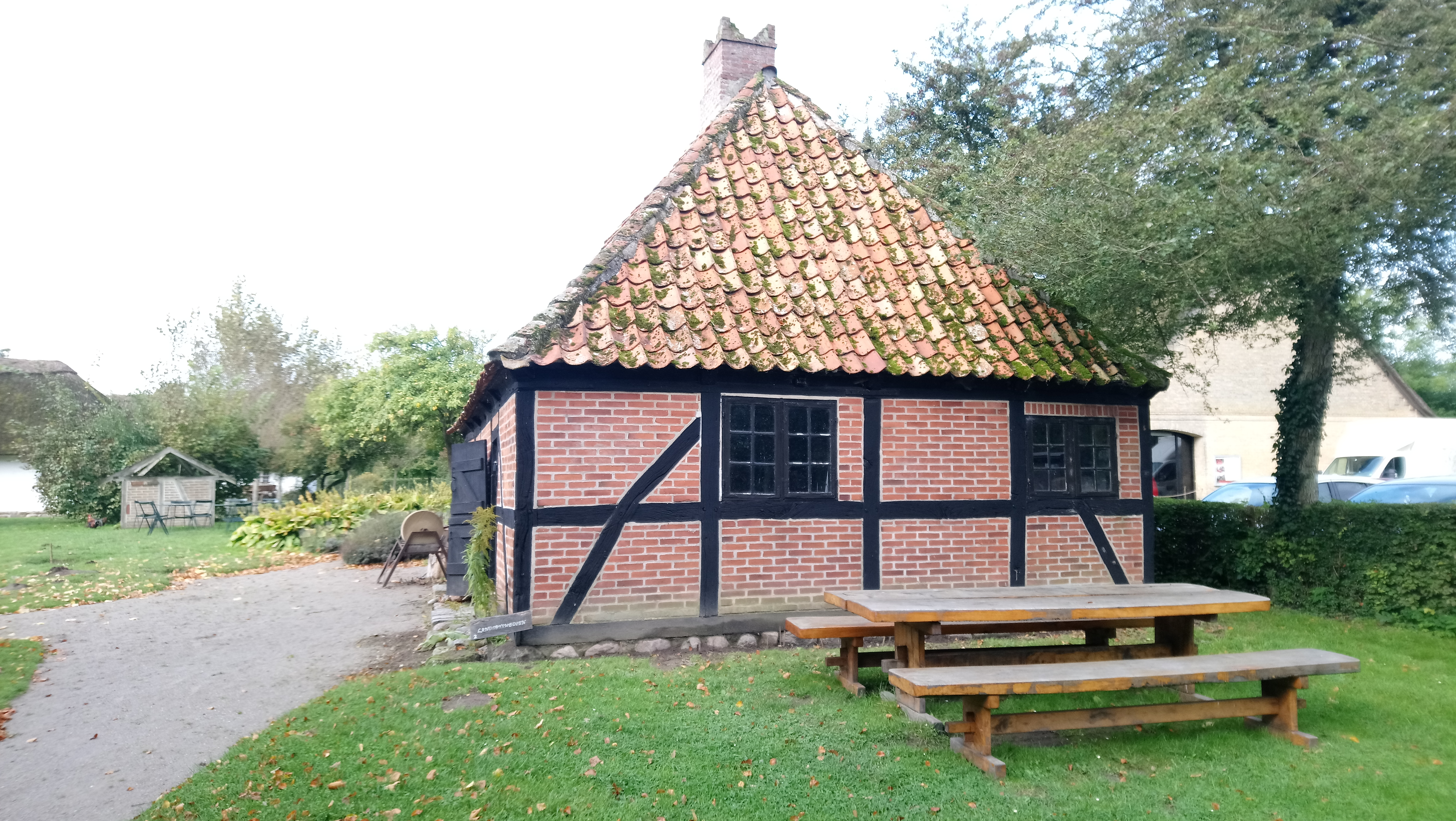
Village Smithy

== See also ==
- Stiftsmuseum Maribo
- Fuglsang Art Museum
