= Maribo Abbey =

Danish abbey established in 1416

Coordinates: 54°46′21.84″N 11°29′59.86″E

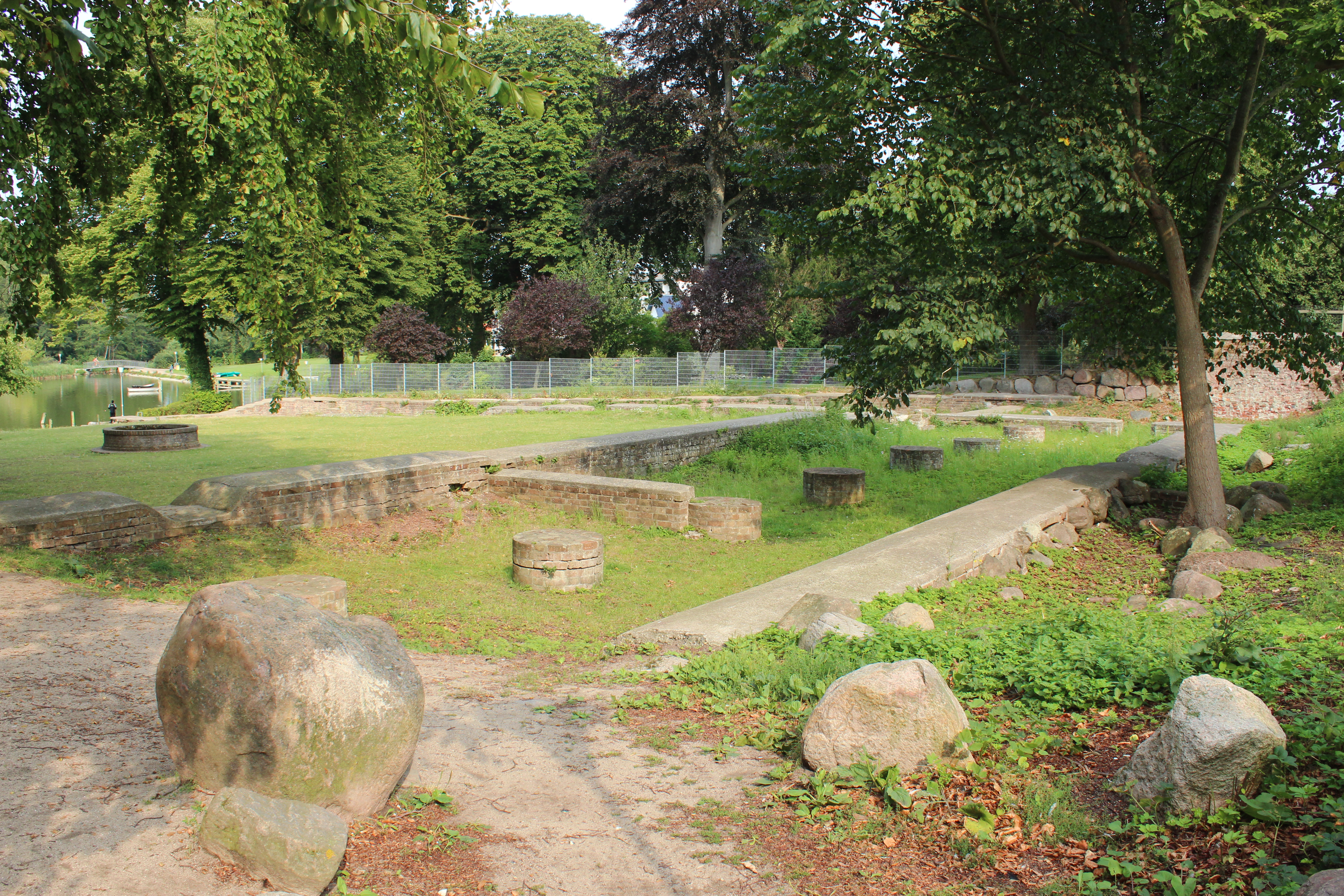
The ruins today.

Maribo Abbey, established in 1416, was the first Bridgettine monastery in Denmark and became one of the most important Danish abbeys of the late Middle Ages. It was located in the present town of Maribo on the island of Lolland (Region Sjælland) in southern Denmark. The monastery is in ruins, but the abbey church still remains in use as Maribo Cathedral.

== History ==
=== Bridgettine nuns ===
The first Bridgettine abbey in Denmark was established in 1416 in the town of Skimminge on a gift of land (Grimstrup) from Queen Margaret I and supplemented by her heir, Eric of Pomerania. Monks from the mother house of the Bridgettine Order, Vadstena Abbey in Sweden, were dispatched to set up a daughter house. At the same time the town, renamed "Marienbo" (later Maribo), received a city charter which gave it protection from interference by local nobles. The new foundation received papal confirmation in 1418.

Construction had begun on the quire of Skimminge church some time before 1408. The existing work on the church was apparently incorporated into the new abbey church which was completed by 1470. It was built in Gothic style in red brick, the most common building material of the day in the region. It was rectangular with a nave and two side aisles the same height as the nave and choir.

Bridgettine abbeys were double monasteries, meaning that they contained both nuns and canons. The order stipulated that the complement of a house should be 60 nuns, 13 canons, four deacons and eight lay brothers. The conventual buildings consisted of two separate sections, with nuns on the north side and canons on the south. The abbess kept order among the nuns and had ultimate control of the abbey; the 13 canons were led by the general confessor.

At its height, Maribo Abbey owned several manors and over 400 farms, making it one of Denmark's great landowners in the Middle Ages.

=== Dissolution ===
Denmark became officially Lutheran in October 1536 when the King and State Council adopted the Lutheran Ordinances. Reformation of local churches had been occurring since the mid 1520s, but after 1536 the government closed all religious houses. Although Maribo Abbey was dissolved as a religious institution, the nuns were permitted to live out their lives, without state assistance, until 1551. Some of the nuns apparently went to Mariager Abbey on Jutland where the last nun died in 1588. A few of the nuns stayed on at Maribo.

=== Secular canonesses ===
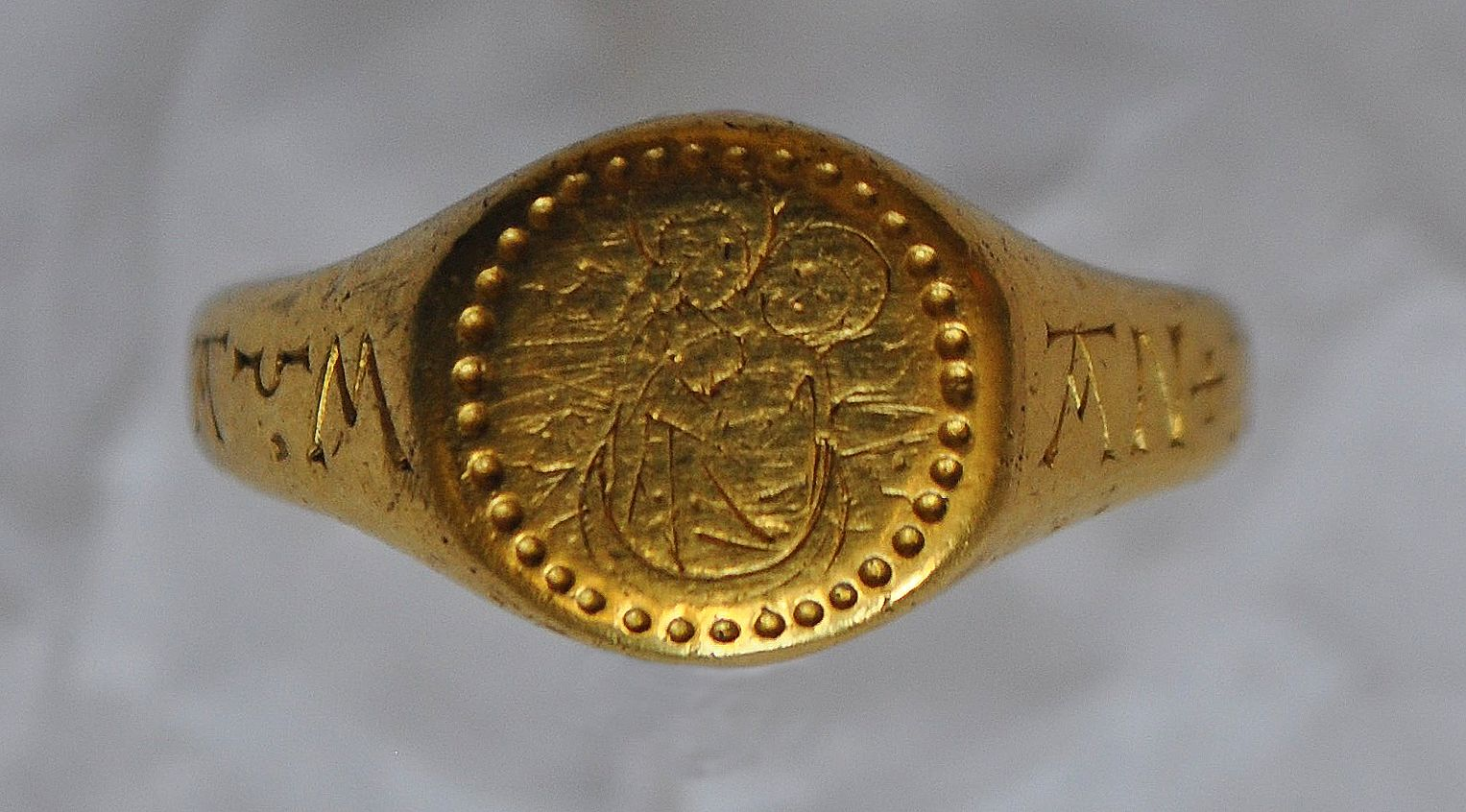
Gold ring (seal ring) found in the former grounds of Maribo Abbey, dating from c. 1500.

In 1556 the abbey was organized into a Lutheran house of secular canonesses for the use of unmarried noblewomen. In August of that year King Christian III visited Maribo to witness the induction of a young woman into the Lutheran abbey. Lady Mette Marsvinsdatter was named abbess and given control over the vast estates which funded the community once again. Lady Drude Pogvisk was named prioress, Lady Mette's second in command. After the king's visit, a number of noble families paid to accommodate their unmarried daughters or sisters at the abbey for the rest of their lives, unless a marriage prospect arose. These women were not nuns, although their days were supposed to be filled with Protestant religious activity and good works.

The abbey's renewal was not without its critics. Already in 1563 the Lutheran Bishop of Fyn, who had responsibility for Maribo, received complaints that the abbey was harboring Roman Catholics. Allegations of the continued prayers for the souls of the dead, the singing of Catholic hymns, the refusal to listen to the Lutheran pastor's sermons (he was heckled in church), and the resumption of the habit of the Bridgettines were all cited as proof that the abbey was "corrupting" the women who went to live there. In subsequent years the charges became even worse: the abbey was opened to anyone who wanted to visit; the women fought openly and refused to comply with the rule or the abbess; many were drunk on a regular basis, drinking up the fourteen barrels of beer received each year as rent and more. It was also asserted that women's rooms were used as brothels for any young nobleman who wandered inside.

In 1596 Maribo's parish church burned down, and the abbey church became also the parish church for the town. The abbey was closed down in 1621, and its buildings and estates given to Sorø Academy as an income property. Most of the buildings were torn down for building materials, leaving only the church still in use.

=== Cathedral ===
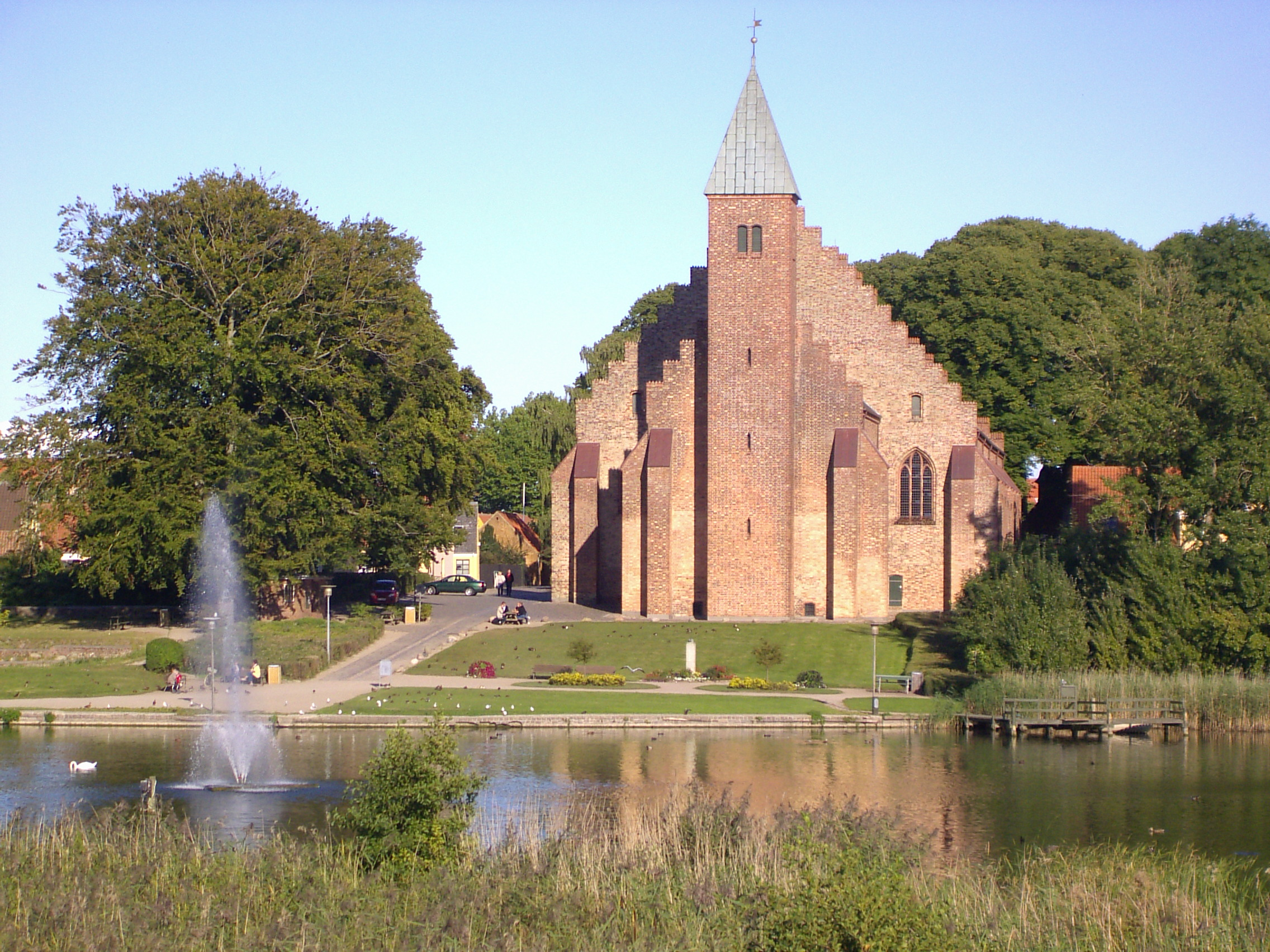
Maribo Cathedral, formerly Maribo Abbey church.

In 1803 when the Diocese of Lolland–Falster was created, Maribo Abbey church became its cathedral. However, with only such a small town to support it, the building had fallen into disrepair. In the 1860s the church was restored and a new, slender, west tower built to replace the old one. The church's tower has five bells: the oldest, a survival by an unknown maker from the original abbey church, cracked and was removed from the tower in 1996.

== New Bridgettine nuns ==
Maribo once again has a women's Bridgettine community, the Habitaculum Mariæ Abbey, established in the town in 2006. However, its location is distinct from the historical original Bridgettine site, which has protected status.

== See also ==
- List of churches on Lolland

== Sources ==
- Maribo Cathedral official website: Maribo Abbey (in Danish)
- Byhistorie.dk: Maribo (in Danish)
