= Theologisk Oratorium =

Theologisk Oratorium (Theological Oratory) is a Lutheran, moderately high church, religious Brotherhood for men in the Church of Denmark. It was founded in 1927. Dissolved in 2016.

== Foundation ==
Thomas Lønborg-Jensen had been in England in 1926 and was influenced by the life of the Anglican ordinands of Kelham Theological College, operated by the Society of the Sacred Mission. In Copenhagen he founded Teologisk Oratorium as a religious society for theological students of the University of Copenhagen, which would combine a common liturgical life with mutual pastoral care and studying.

The circle of founding brothers included Regin Prenter, Richard Fangel, and Dag Monrad Møller. In 1936 Viggo Lissner, a parish priest, formed the initial "priest group" of the Oratory, so that student members could continue in Theologisk Oratorium after their graduation.

== Organisation and leadership ==
The Oratory is divided into regional conventions, which meet twice a year. The General Convention is held annually in June. The organisation of the Theologisk Oratorium is simple; there is no corporate Chapter, but only a Leader of the Brotherhood, and local superiors of the regional conventions.

Its Leader since 1999 has been Steen Skovsgaard, formerly the Bishop of Lolland–Falster.

== Common life ==
The daily office, private confession, the Eucharist, and reading of theology are important parts of the common life of the members. The Oratorium has published many books, on subjects including the daily offices and gregorian chant. Today the Oratorium has a student group in the University of Aarhus, but is no longer active in the University of Copenhagen.

Teologisk Oratorium celebrated its 75th anniversary in 2002.

== See also ==
- Oratory of Saint Philip Neri (Roman Catholic)
- Oratory of the Good Shepherd (Anglican)
