= St Michael's House =

Former Anglican theological college in Australia

St Michael's House was an Australian educational institution in Crafers outside Adelaide, under the auspices of the Society of the Sacred Mission, established in 1947 and which was destroyed by fire in the Ash Wednesday bushfires in 1983 shortly after its closure. It trained candidates for ordination in the Anglican Church of Australia.

== Origins ==
A colonial businessman, John Bakewell (who was the son of the South Australian MP William Bakewell), built a home in Mount Lofty (now known as Crafers) which he named "Koralla". Bakewell's daughter, Audine, married an Irish doctor, Arthur Pryce Evelyn O'Leary. O'Leary died in 1929 and in 1943 his widow left "Koralla" to the Anglican Diocese of Adelaide.

Bryan Robin, Bishop of Adelaide from 1941 to 1956, encouraged members of the Society of the Sacred Mission (SSM) to come to Adelaide from Kelham to establish a theological college in order to boost clergy numbers. SSM had been established in London in 1893 by Fr Herbert Kelly and the following year began training working-class men for the priesthood. In 1903, SSM purchased Kelham Hall, which then formed the origins of St Michael's House.

St Michael's House was established in 1947, and offered a five-year training course. Along with the theological college, there was an SSM priory on the site. The first priest to graduate from St Michael's was Fr Austin Day, later the renowned rector of the leading Anglo-Catholic church in Sydney, Christ Church St Laurence, for 32 years from 1964 to 1996.

== College years ==
It was the students at St Michael's House (along with those of Ormond College at the University of Melbourne) who were the first in Australia to observe the Week of Prayer for Christian Unity, in the 1950s. St Michael's students protested against the Vietnam War, regarded as a controversial act at the time.

Kelham, priding itself on its tradition of offering working class men a route to ordination, never issued hoods, but St Michael's House introduced a hood. With the passage of years, and increasing reticence of bishops to send candidates to St Michael's for training, the future of St Michael's had become uncertain. By 1983 most of the teaching was undertaken at the society's priory house in central Adelaide, St John's. St Michael's House had been reduced to just a retreat house.

== Destruction ==
On Ash Wednesday in 1983 parts of South Australia and Victoria experienced devastating bushfires, subsequently known as the Ash Wednesday Bushfires. St Michael's House was destroyed, and not rebuilt. The few remaining members of SSM survived the fire by hiding in the basement. Those who escaped the fire included Fr Jonathan Ewer, the last prior. The only remaining ruins are the former gatehouse. The entire 40,000 volume library, which had been sold to Trinity College in Melbourne in anticipation of the closure of the college, perished. Kelham had closed in 1971, and the library had been dispersed, in part to St Michael's House. Those volumes were all lost. The theological college did not reopen; the priory house moved to Diggers Rest in Victoria.

== Wardens ==
Most wardens were also priors of the SSM Priory, and often provincials of the Australian SSM.

- Fr Basil Oddie SSM, 1947-56
- Fr Nicholas Allenby SSM, 1957–62, subsequently Bishop of Kuching in Sarawak and then Malaysia, 1962-68.
- Fr Austin Day
- Fr John Lewis SSM, 1962–68, subsequently Bishop of North Queensland, 1971-96.
- Fr Dunstan McKee SSM, provincial and prior 1969 -? (not warden)
- Fr Thomas Brown SSM, 1969- c. 1971 warden but not prior.
- Br (later Fr) Gilbert Sinden SSM, c 1973
- Fr Jonathan Ewer SSM, 1976-83.

== Notable alumni ==
- Douglas Brown SSM, director of the Anglican Centre in Rome, 1991-1995.
- John Forsyth, warden of Wollaston College, 1979-82
- Hilary Greenwood, teacher at SMH (1961-66) and warden of Kelham Hall (1970-73)
- Hamish Jamieson, Bishop of Carpentaria (1974–84) and Bunbury (1984–2000)
- Michael Lapsley, anti-apartheid and social justice activist
- John Lewis, Bishop of North Queensland (1971–96)
- David McCall, Bishop of Willochra (1987–2000) and Bunbury (2000–10)
- David Murray, assistant bishop in the Diocese of Perth (1991–2006)
