= Aarhus theologians =

Group of Danish theologians

The Aarhus Theologians was a group of four Danish theologians, all professors at the University of Aarhus, who, in the second half of the 20th century, influenced Danish philosophy and theology. The group consisted of P. G. Lindhardt, K. E. Løgstrup, Regin Prenter, and Johannes Sløk.
