= Steen Skovsgaard =

The Right Reverend Steen Skovsgaard
- Bishop emeritus of Lolland–Falster
- Church: Church of Denmark
- Diocese: Lolland–Falster
- Elected: 2005
- In office: 2005–2017
- Predecessor: Holger Jepsen
- Successor: Marianne Gaarden

Orders
- Ordination: 1979
- Consecration: 11 September 2005

Personal details
- Born: 30 September 1952 (age 74) Bolbro, Denmark
- Denomination: Lutheran
- Spouse: Susanne Skovsgaard
- Children: 4
- Education: Aarhus University

Steen Skovsgaard (born 30 September 1952 in Bolbro) is a Danish prelate of the Church of Denmark serving as the Bishop of Lolland–Falster from 2005 to 2017. He was replaced by Marianne Gaarden.

== Life ==
After graduation in 1979, Skovsgaard became the vicar of Gellerup church in Århus. Between 1988 - 1989 he was served as vicar of Klaksvík in the Faroe Islands and in 1997, he became the Dean of Aarhus.

During his time in Gellerup, Skovsgaard dealt with various issues facing the Church of Denmark such as meeting with Muslims. He was also chairman of the Christian Information and Documentation Center on Islam and Christianity (KIVIK) 2001 - 2005, rigid priest on Islam and Christianity 1995 - 2000 and Chairman of the pin committee on Islam and Christianity in the Diocese of Aarhus between 1995 and 1999 . He was also the leader of Theological Oratory between 1999 and 2010. In 2008 he became Knight of the Order of the Dannebrog. On 11 September 2005 Skovsgaard was installed as Bishop of Lolland–Falster.
