= Maribo Cathedral =

Coordinates: 54°46′22″N 11°30′00″E

- Maribo Domkirke
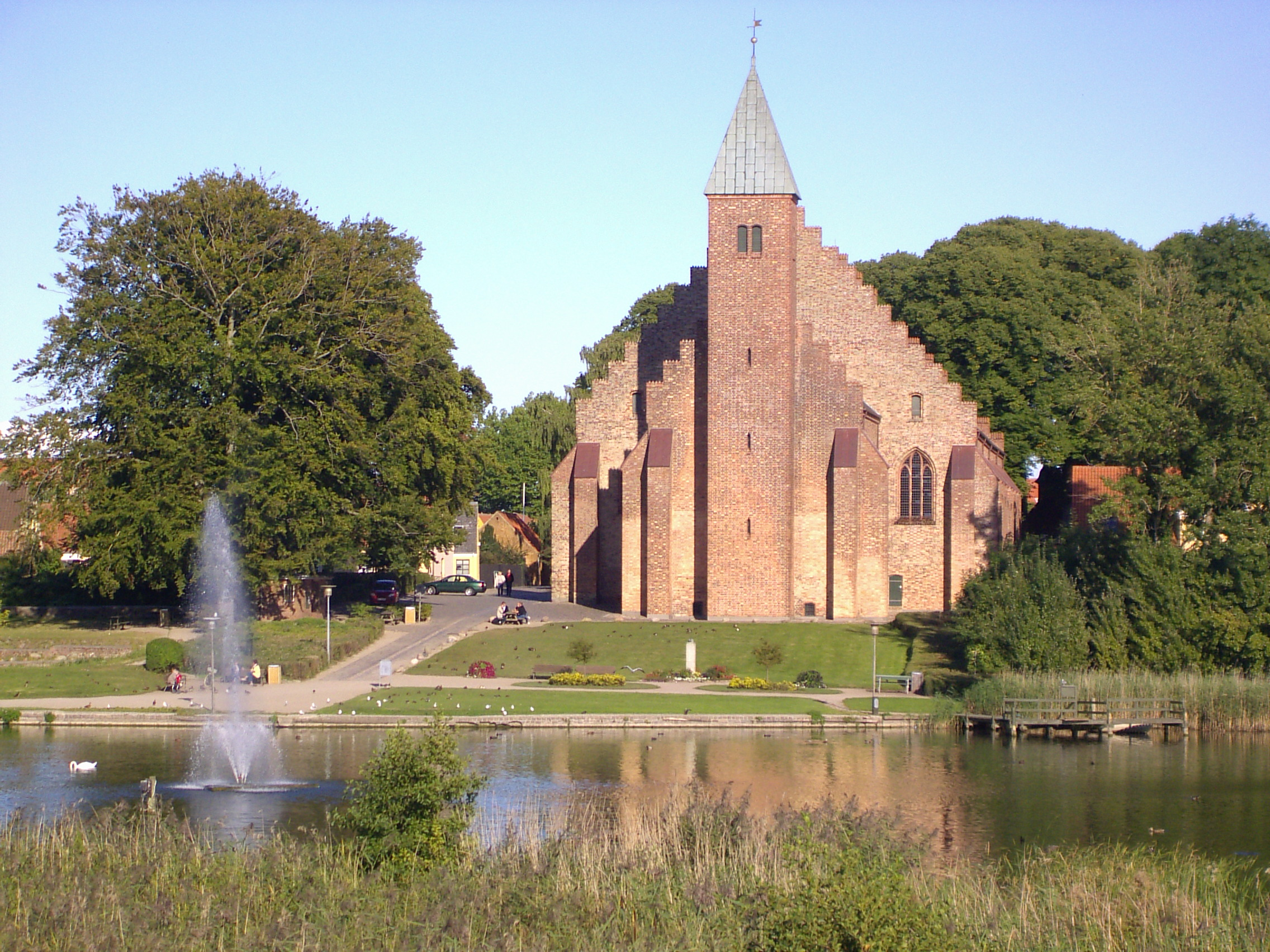
- Maribo Domkirke
- Maribo Cathedral
- Location: Lolland
- Country: Denmark
- Denomination: Church of Denmark
- Previous denomination: Roman Catholic
- Website: www.maribodomkirke.dk

History
- Former name: Maribo Abbey Church
- Status: Cathedral
- Founded: 15th century
- Dedication: Virgin Mary; Bridget of Sweden

Architecture
- Architectural type: Gothic

Administration
- Diocese: Lolland–Falster

Clergy
- Bishop: Marianne Gaarden

Maribo Cathedral (Danish: Maribo Domkirke) is a Lutheran cathedral church built in the Gothic style in Maribo on the island of Lolland in the southeast of Denmark. It was originally part of Maribo Abbey which was founded in the early 15th century. The chancel, the oldest section of the cathedral, probably dates from 1416. The plan of the church is unusual in that the chancel is at the west end of the building rather than the east as a result of the design instructions left by Saint Bridget.

== History ==
Maribo church was originally dedicated to the Virgin Mary and to Saint Bridget of Vadstena (1303–1373), a Catholic and the founder of the Bridgettine order of nuns and monks. The church was built in the village of Skimminge (later renamed Maribo) in the early 15th century. It was Queen Margrethe I who provided land for a monastery to be built there, encouraged by her childhood tutor, Märta (1319-1371), who was St. Bridget's daughter.

In 1418, in connection with recognition of the monastery, the pope decreed that the town should be renamed the community of Mary (Habitaculum Mariae) leading to the adoption of Danish Marienbo, later Maribo. A note from the journal of Vadstena Abbey, the mother church, states that monks left to found a monastery in Skimminge in 1416.

After the Reformation in 1536, the monastery continued to exist but in 1556 was converted into a Protestant convent for young ladies. When the town's main church burnt down in 1596, the convent church became the parish church of Maribo. After the convent was finally demolished in 1621, ownership of the church was transferred to the town. From 1803, with the establishment of the Lutheran Diocese of Lolland-Falster, the church was usually referred to as a cathedral but it was only in 1924 that it officially received the status of cathedral (domkirke).

== Architecture ==
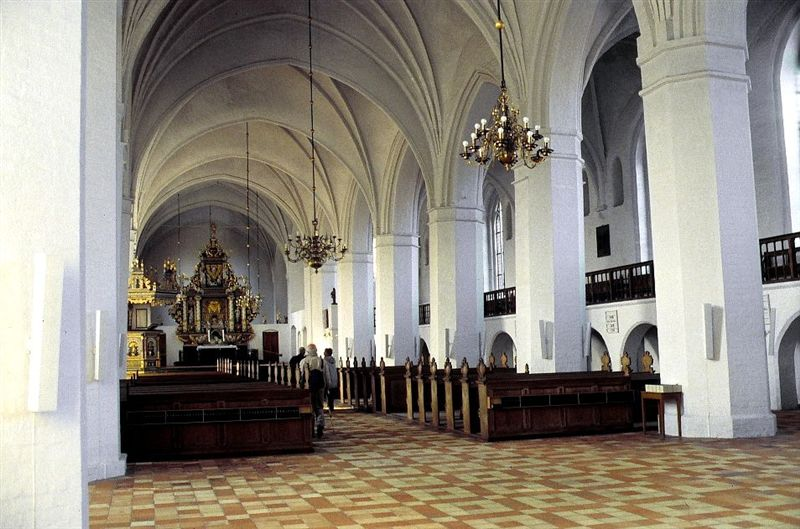
Cathedral nave

The Gothic cathedral is built of red brick as a hall church with a nave flanked by equally high aisles with a common roof. In accordance with St. Bridget's instructions, to the west (rather than the east), there is a lower and narrower chancel. Completed in 1446, the four west bays of the nave (which has a total length of 60 m (200 ft)) are built of the same bricks as the chancel but the four east bays, completed around 1470, were apparently built by another mason. Designed by Hermann Baagøe Storck (1839–1922) the tower on the west gable is relatively recent (1891) but replaces an earlier tower built in the Middle Ages, similar to that in the former Mariager Church which was also built according to St. Bridgit's instructions. The two doors at the west end of the building were for ordinary people: men used the south door while women entered through the north door. The relief in the gable wall represents Christ on the Cross surrounded by the sun and moon and by instruments of torture. The chancel has the same star-vaulting as the nave, supported by octagonal pillars. The galleries above the aisles and at the east end of the church were built to accommodate the nuns who had to be carefully separated from the monks and the congregation.

== Interior ==
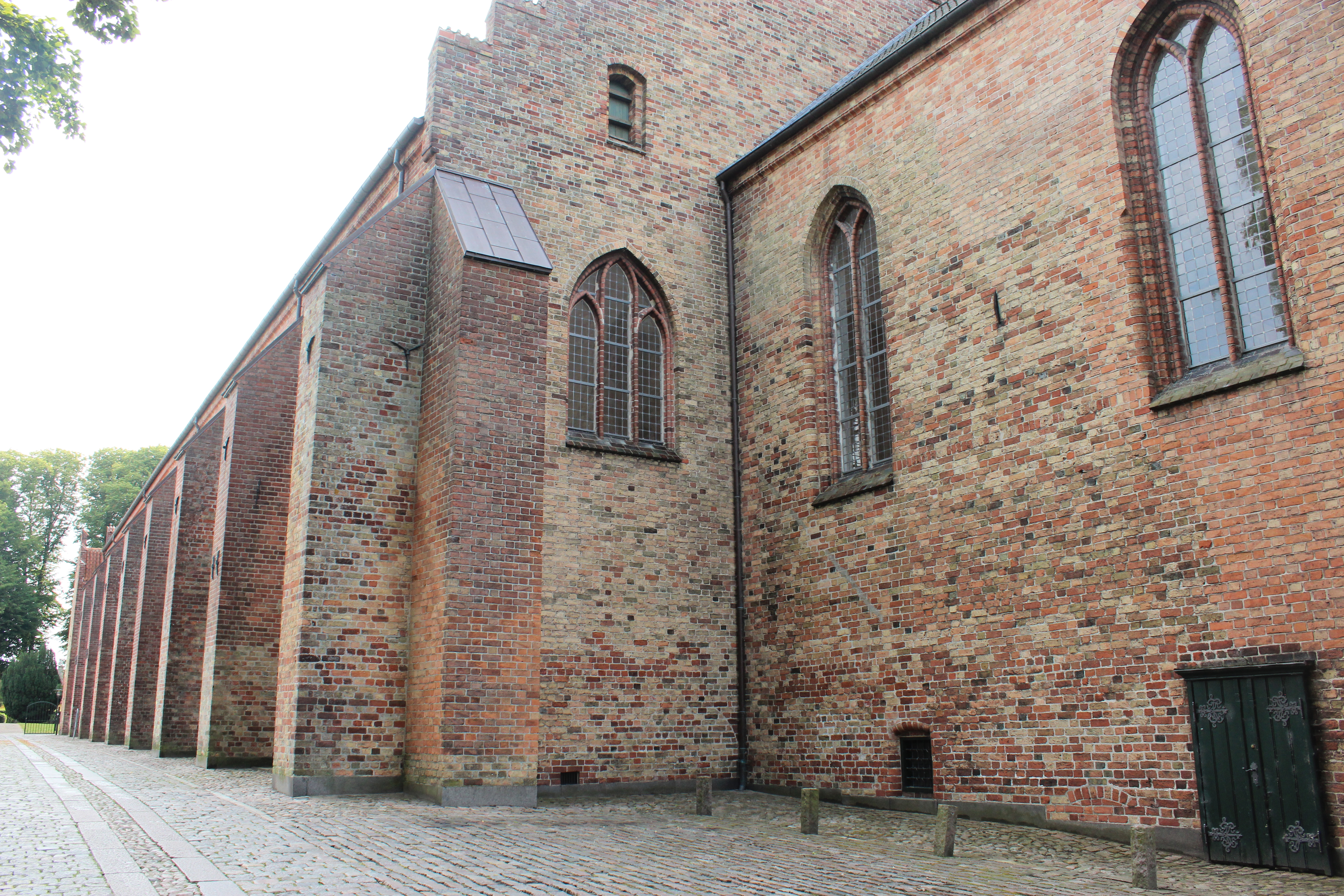
Northwest view on the Cathedral

The Baroque altarpiece (1641) carved in the auricular style is the work of sculptor Henrik Werner (ca. 1636–ca. 1669) from northern Germany. The central panel, flanked by columns, depicts the Last Supper. Below Christ can be seen in the Garden of Gethsemane and, above, at the Resurrection. Figures of the four Evangelists are also presented.

The baptismal font is of sandstone and dates from 1777. The Late-Renaissance pulpit (1606) has five arcaded panels with the Evangelists and the figure of Christ. The figure of Christ on the chancel arch crucifix is from the late 15th century although the cross itself is recent. The font is centred on the church's oldest font from the early 17th century. The figures of the Evangelists are presented in relief. It was renovated in 1777. The Augustinian Altar from the late 15th century depicting Saint Augustine in pontifical attire flanked by paintings of the Holy Trinity, Pope Gregory's mass, the Annunciation and Saint Anne.

Of particular note is the Bridget Altar (Birgitta Alter) from the late 15th century with a painting of a woman in flowing clothes, thought either to be St. Bridgit or the Virgin Mary. Housed in a cupboard with two doors, it is said to be the oldest painting on canvas in Scandinavia.

== Gallery ==
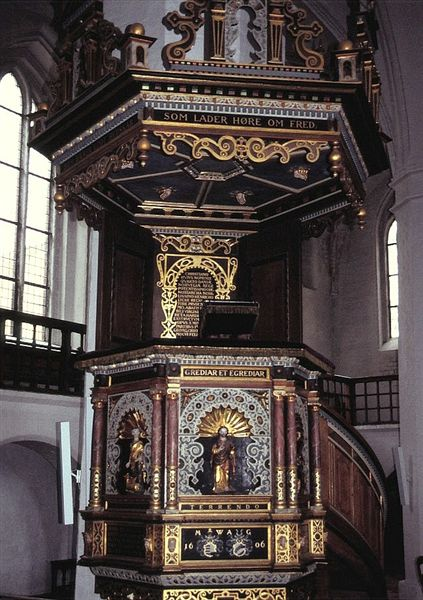
Pulpit
(1606)

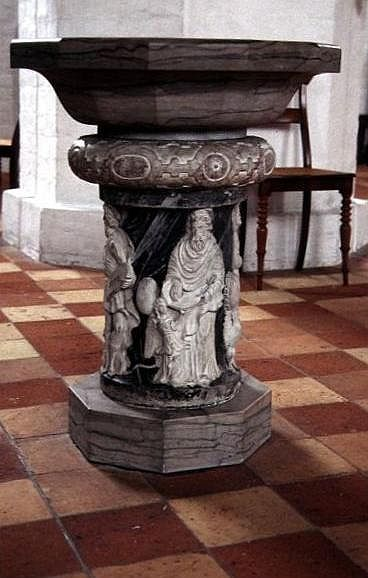
Baptismal Font (1777)

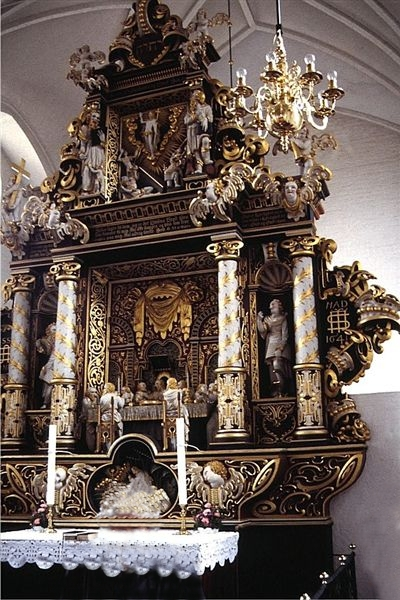
Altarpiece (1641)

== See also ==
- Maribo Abbey
- List of churches on Lolland
