= Hilary Greenwood =

Hilary Peter Frank Greenwood (26 February 1929 – 10 September 2003) was an Anglican theologian and known as the writer of the hymn, 'Walking in a Garden.' The hymn was written for Greenwood's nephews and originally meant to be set to the tune of "Puff, the Magic Dragon." It is often set to the tune "Au Clair de la Lune" as well.

Born in Manchester, Greenwood trained for ordination at Kelham and was ordained deacon in 1957 and priest in 1958, having joined the Society of the Sacred Mission in 1954. Greenwood was a teacher at St Michael's House in Australia from 1961 to 1966 and at Kelham from 1966 to 1974 where he was Warden from 1970 to 1974. From 1991 to 1995 he was the Anglican chaplain in Prague.

He died in Australia in 2003.
