= Lolland Falster Airport =

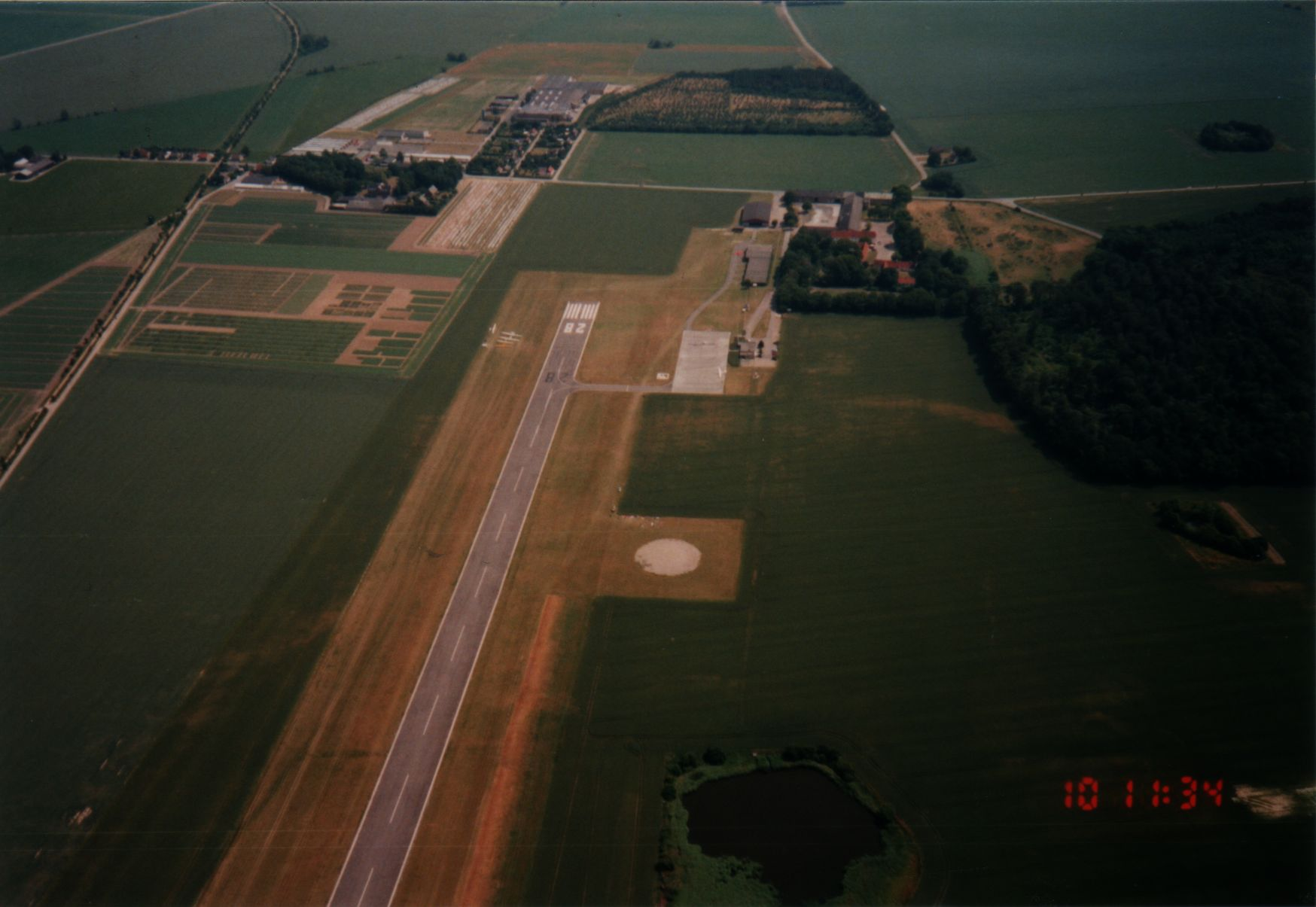
- Lolland Falster Airport with Runway 28 (now 27)
- IATA: MRW; ICAO: EKMB

Summary
- Location: Lolland, Denmark
- Elevation AMSL: 16 ft / 5 m
- Coordinates: 54.69938°N 11.43986°E
- Interactive map of Lolland Falster Airport

Runways
Direction	Length		Surface
Direction	ft	m	Surface
09/27	3,937	1,200	Asphalt

Lolland Falster Airport, also known as Maribo Airport (IATA: MRW, ICAO: EKMB), is an airport between the towns of Holeby and Rødby south of Maribo on the island of Lolland in Denmark.

== Airlines and destinations ==
There are currently no scheduled services to/from Lolland Falster Airport.
