= Maribo cheese =

Danish cheese

Maribo
- Country of origin: Denmark
- Source of milk: cow
- Pasteurised: yes
- Texture: semi-hard
- Fat content: 30-45%
- Aging time: 4 months

Maribo is a Danish semi-hard cheese made from cow's milk. Named after the town of Maribo on the island of Lolland, it has a firm, dry interior; a creamy texture; and many small, irregular holes. It has a pale tan rind covered in yellow wax. Its flavour is tangy, and it is sometimes seasoned with caraway seeds.

== See also ==
- List of cheeses
