= Johannes Sløk =

Danish philosopher

Johannes Sløk (27 April 1916 in Frederiksberg – 30 June 2001) was a Danish philosopher, professor at the University of Aarhus and founder of "Idéhistorie" (History of ideas), an interdisciplinary discipline mainly about writings pertaining to the ideas of Western culture since Antiquity. The concept is now the "Department of Philosophy and History of Ideas", a department under the faculty of humanities of Aarhus University. During the student rising of 1968, Sløk was made be forced to leave his position as professor at Idéhistorie, and the institute became oriented around the Marxist theory. Sløk instead was granted a special position at the Department of Theology, as professor of analytic theology. Sløk was one of the four Aarhus theologians and wrote a series of books on religion and its meaning to the modern man.

== Works ==
- Forsynstanken: et Forsøg paa en dogmatisk Begrebsbestemmelse, disputats, 1947.
- Platon, 1950.
- Die Formbildungen der Sprache und die Kategorie der Verkündigung, 1951.
- Die Anthropologie Kierkegaards, 1954.
- Tradition og nybrud: Pico Mirandola, 1957.
- Kristen moral før og nu, 1959.
- Det religiøse instinkt, 1960.
- Platon, 1960.
- De europæiske ideers historie (medforfatter), 1962.
- Søren Kierkegaard, 1963.
- Eksistentialisme, 1964.
- Stoikerne, 1966.
- Det absurde teater og Jesu forkyndelse, 1968.
- Hvad er idehistorie?, 1968.
- Fylde eller tomhed: en idehistorisk skitse, 1968.
- Kritiske bemærkninger, kroniksamling, 1973.
- Nicolaus Cusanus og hans filosofiske system, bd.1. Cusanus' dialog om visdommen, bd. 2., 1974.
- Kierkegaard - humanismens tænker, 1978.
- Teologiens elendighed, 1979.
- Da Kierkegaard tav, 1980.
- Det religiøse sprog, 1981.
- Den kristne forkyndelse, 1983.
- Kierkegaards univers. En ny guide til geniet, 1983.
- Da Gud fortalte en historie, 1985.
- Mig og Godot. Erindringsforskydninger, 1986.
- Religionsfilosofiske problemer, 1987.
- Opgøret mellem filosofi og retorik. Platons dialog "Gorgias", 1987.
- Herre, giv mig mere vantro, 1988.
- Det her samfund, 1989.
- Da mennesket tog magten, 1989.
- Shakespeare. Renæssancen som drama, 1990.
- Hvad i alverden er verden?, 1991.
- Moralen der blev væk, 1993.
- 80 år med Gud. Afhandlinger og essays, 1996.
- Opdagelsen af mennesket, 1996.
- Mennesket og verden, 1996.
- Livets elendighed. Kierkegaard og Schopenhauer, 1997.
- Prædikener, 1998.

== Shakespeare translations ==
- Romeo og Julie, 1969.
- Othello, 1970.
- Macbeth, 1970.
- Lige for lige, 1970.
- Kong Lear, 1970.
- Othello, 1971.
- Hamlet Prins af Danmark, 1971.
- Tragedien om Julius Cæsar, 1972.
- Antonius og Cleopatra, 1972.
- Som man behager; 1978.
- Vintereventyret, 1981.
- Uvejret, 1983.
- Tragedien om Richard 3, 1984.
- Kong Henrik 4 1. og 2. del, 1985.
