= David Jenks =

David Jenks SSM (1866–1935) was a priest of the Church of England and member of the Society of the Sacred Mission (SSM). Jenks became the Director of the SSM in 1910 in succession to Father Herbert Kelly.

== Works ==
- A Study of Meditation (1909)
- Study of Intercession (1917)
- The Fulfilment of the Church (1920)
- The Church in India, ed. E. P. Swain. SPCK (1923)
- In the Face of Jesus Christ (1925)
- A Study of World Evangelisation (1926)
- Renewal of Life in the Clergy (1929)
- Services of Worship and Devotion for Corporate and Private Use in Times of Renewal of Life, ed. D. Jenks (1929)
- Scattered Sheep (1930)
- Six Great Missionaries of the Sixteenth and Seventeenth Centuries (1930)
