= George Every =

British historian (1909–2003)

- Born: 3 February 1909; Tipton St John, Devon, England
- Died: 2 September 2003 (aged 94); Warwickshire, England
- Occupations: Historian, theologian, writer

George Every (3 February 1909 – 2 September 2003) was a British historian, theologian, writer on Christian mythology and poet.

== Life ==
George Every was born, along with a twin brother Edward, on 3 February 1909 in Tipton St John, Devon where his father, also George Every, was the village vicar. George, Edward and their sister Mary (born 1911) spent the majority of their youth with their parents, and extended family in the East Devon area. Every was a member of the Anglican religious community the Society of the Sacred Mission at Kelham, Nottinghamshire from 1929 to 1973. He then became a Roman Catholic and taught at Oscott College. He was known as a historian of Byzantium and was in some ways a follower of Christopher Dawson.

Every encountered T.S. Eliot at Kelham and introduced him to the history of Little Gidding, later to be the title for one of Eliot's Four Quartets through his draft verse play Stalemate at Little Gidding. On the occasion, in 1948, of Eliot's sexagenarianism, Every wrote for a dedicatory compendium a piece on the poet's religious leanings and its broader significance.

== Works ==
- The Roots of the 16th Century Reformation: Sociological and Political (1936)
- Christian Discrimination (1940)
- Selected Poems (1945), with S. L. Bethell, J. D. C. Pellow
- The Byzantine Patriarchate, 451-1204 (1947)
- Poetry and Personal Responsibility: an Interim Report on Contemporary Literature (1949)
- The High Church Party, 1688-1718 (1956)
- Lamb To The Slaughter (1957)
- Light Under a Door: Poems about Christmas (1958)
- The Baptismal Sacrifice (1959)
- Basic Liturgy: a Study in the Structure of the Eucharistic Prayer (1961)
- No Pious Person: Autobiographical Recollections, by Herbert Kelly (1960) editor
- Misunderstandings between East and West (1965)
- Christian Mythology (1970)
- New Heaven? New Earth? An Encounter with Pentecostalism (1976), with Simon Tugwell, Peter Hocken, John Orme Mills
- Understanding Eastern Christianity (1978)
- The Mass: Meaning, Mystery and Ritual (1978)
- The Time of the Spirit: Readings Through the Christian Year (1984), anthology, editor, with Richard Harries, Kallistos Ware
- Christian Legends (1987)
- A Christmas Collection: Poems in Incarnation and History (2001)

== Bibliography ==
- Every, George. "The Way of Rejections." In T. S. Eliot: A Symposium, edited by Richard March and Meary James Thurairajah Tambimuttu, 181–188. London: Editions Poetry London, 1948.
