= Society of the Sacred Mission =

The Society of the Sacred Mission (SSM) is an historic religious community of the Church of England founded in 1893 by Father Herbert Kelly, and best known in connection with Kelham Theological College (1903–1973). Since its inception, the aims of the Society have been 'to increase the number of those who give their lives to the divine service', 'to labour for the conversion and perfection of souls', and 'to have regard for the cultivation of divine science'.

Although the remaining professed members in the UK are dispersed, SSM continues to operate as a registered charity centred at St Antony's Priory, Durham, home also of the Herbert Kelly Institute for Anglican Religious Life. Principal areas of activity include the training and provision of spiritual directors, retreat accommodation and a regular timetable of worship in the chapel, whilst the work of the Institute includes managing a specialist theological library, curating archives of Anglican religious communities, facilitating research, and publishing.

== Foundation ==
The Society had its beginnings in the 1880s when the Bishop Charles Corfe of the newly established Anglican mission in Korea asked Kelly to train men for work in his diocese. The ‘Corean Missionary Brotherhood’ was established at 97 Vassall Road, Kennington, on 15 December 1890. On 9 May 1893 the name was changed to the Society of the Sacred Mission and the first three members, Herbert Kelly, Cyril Chilvers and Br Badcock, were clothed as novices. By this time the Society had shifted the focus of its mission to the training of clergy for the Church of England.

From these small beginnings, the society soon began to grow, moving first to Mildenhall, Suffolk, in 1897, and then to Kelham Hall, Nottinghamshire, in 1903, where the community remained until 1973. In 1902 its first overseas mission was established at Modderpoort, South Africa.

Kelly was founder and first director of SSM but became increasingly concerned that the ‘Society’ and ‘Herbert Kelly’ were being seen as synonymous: ‘Kelly & Co.’ to quote a later commentator. In 1910 he resigned as director to allow the Society to grow beyond him. In 1925 he explained: ‘I do not think “Fr. Founder” a healthy term […] Only the spade work, the working (or muddling) of purposes was mine. I am not proud of it.’

== Aims and mission ==
SSM was established to serve the Church by means of the following three principal aims, laid out in the opening paragraph of the Constitution, first drafted in 1894:

Since its inception the aims of the Society have been first, to increase the number of those who give their lives to the divine service, especially by training those of whom at present use cannot be or is not made, whether through their lack of means or of education or through other causes, and to deepen the wholeness of sacrifice in them, where the vocation exists, by building them into the organisation of the religious life; next, to labour for the conversion and perfection of souls, especially among the heathen and in the Church abroad; thirdly, to have regard for the cultivation of divine science. In seeking to fulfil its general object the Society shall interpret and apply the aims in the changing conditions of the world, considering not only the history of the Society but also any new opportunities of glorifying God which he may give.

For much of its history, the primary work of the Society was running theological colleges, first at Kelham, and later in Australia at St Michael’s House, Crafers, near Adelaide, which was founded in 1947, and trained Anglican clergy until 1983, when it was destroyed in a bush fire. Kelly wished to make training for the Anglican priesthood available to men who, whether through lack of means or education, had no opportunity to test and fulfil their vocation. He wrote:

In those days – the 1880s – when curates were much more common than they are now, every part of the Church, notably the mission field, was crying out for men. Where were they to come from? Those recruited through the usual channels were insufficient to meet the new demands. In my second curacy, in south London, I tried to do what I could with the boys in the poor district of Southfields. It seemed to me that the Church could find the men she needed from such as these, if only the necessary education was provided. I went to Scott Holland [citation], the only man I knew among the big people, and suggested that if a free college was started, with no half-baked gentility, we might get quite a number; but who was I to start anything? He said it was coming, but not yet. (The result proved that he was quite wrong.) I was ready to give myself, and what money I had, for anything.

A distinguishing feature of SSM from its earliest days was the background of its members. Many were drawn from the lower middle or working classes and had only received an elementary education. Early recruits included carpenters, shop assistants, clerks, teachers and journalists.

== House of the Sacred Mission, Kelham ==
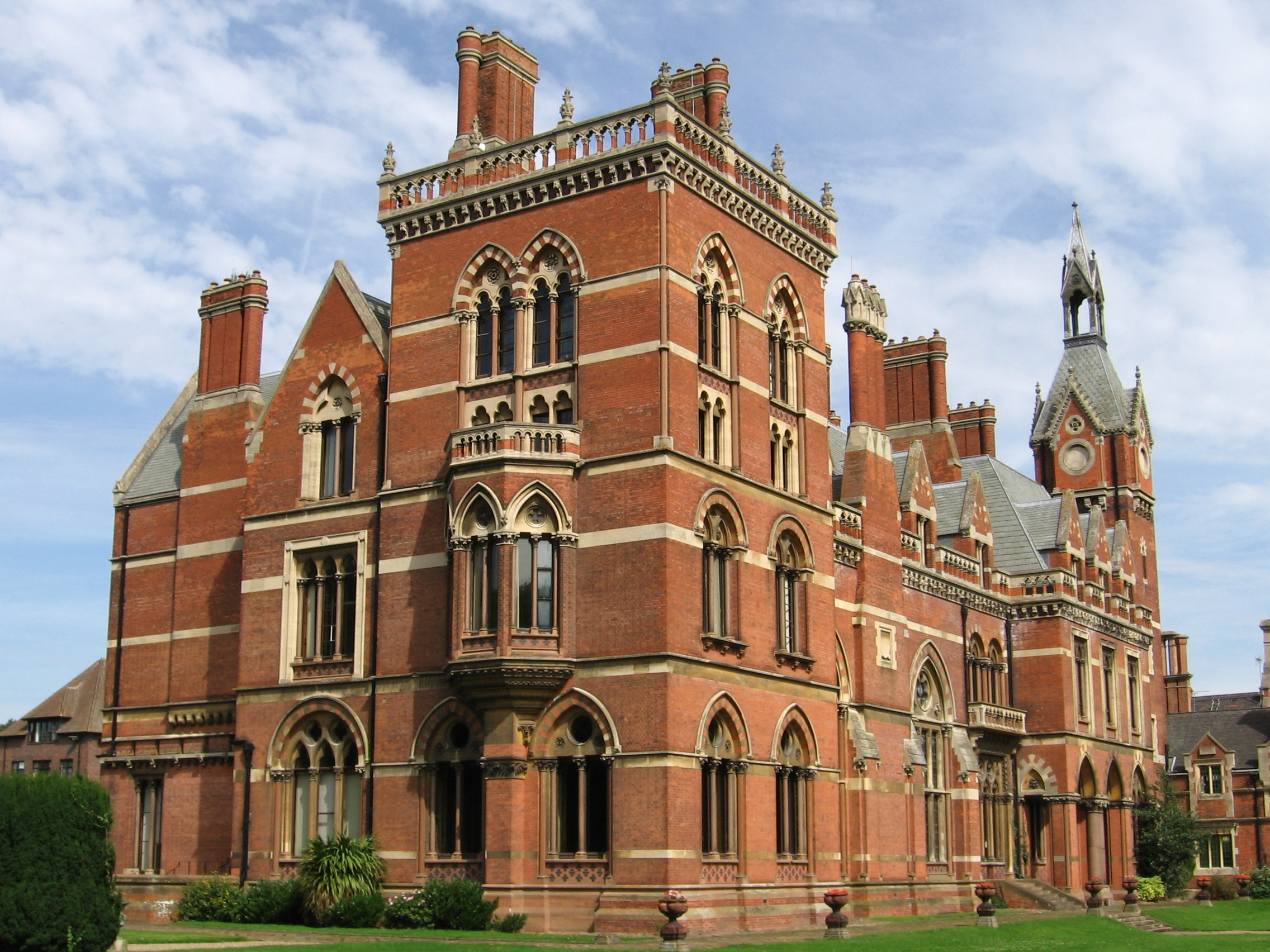
Kelham Hall

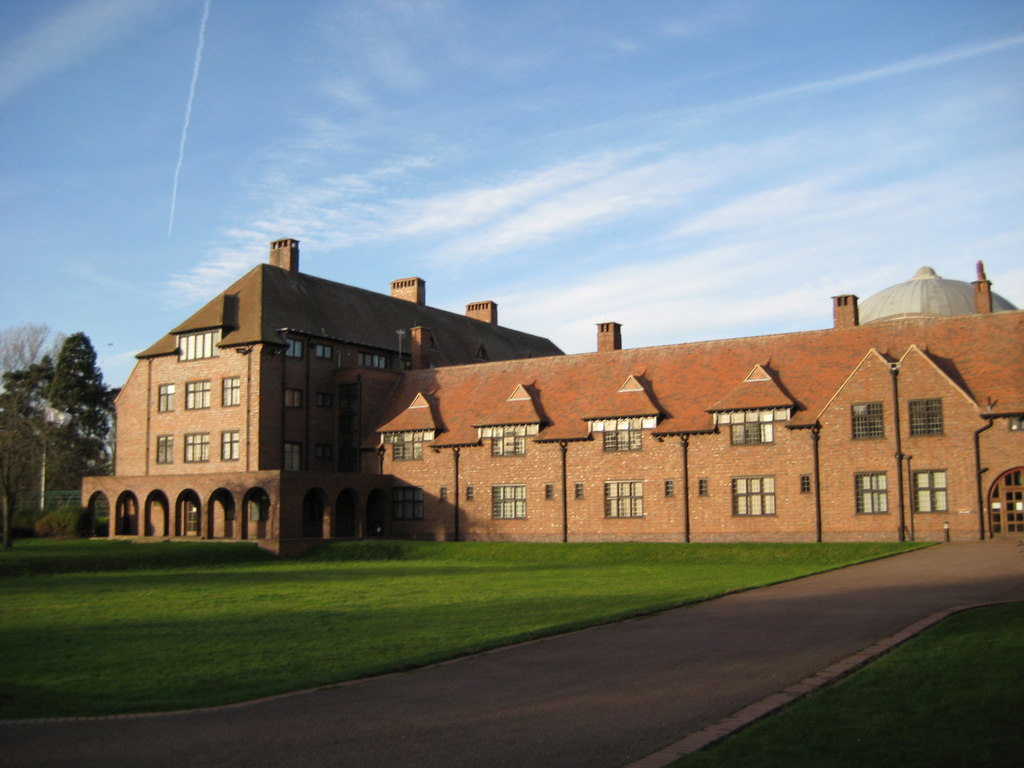
Kelham Hall extensions of 1924-5

Kelham Theological College, near Newark in Nottinghamshire, was the mother house from 1903 until it closed in 1974. SSM boasted 85 members at its high point in 1961, and in 1969 Kelham had 76 students, more than any other theological college in the Church of England at the time.

Kelham Hall had been built between 1859 and 1862 by Sir George Gilbert Scott, the architect of St Pancras Station, with which it shares the same Gothic style. From 1903 it served as the theological college, and the Society of the Sacred Mission added a great domed chapel, completed and dedicated in 1928. The chapel is almost square in shape, dominated architecturally by the great central dome (62 feet across and 68 feet high), which is the second largest concrete dome in England. Kelham parish church is located immediately adjacent to the hall.

Here professed members of the community, novices, and students (associates) studying for ordination lived, worshipped and worked together, a unique arrangement in any theological college. The lifestyle, for both monks and students, was simple. The Hall had no lighting except oil lamps, no heating except open fires, and no water supply above the ground floor. However, it boasted ample space, with accommodation for up to 100 students, and extensive gardens and playing fields. Kelham remained the mother house of the Society for seventy years.

Fr Kelly had not really intended to start a religious community, but rather to train men for the new Korean Mission. Quite quickly he took up training priests for the Church in England, and formed a community of priests and lay-brothers as the best way of doing it. He himself was a bit of an academic failure, and he thought that the clergy of his generation spent too much of their time studying theology in the atmosphere of the universities. He viewed the move of the Bishops to restrict ordination to graduates as very foolish. But he was quite sure that men from non-academic, ‘working class’ backgrounds needed a formation which was demanding and rigorous: he aimed to teach his students to think, to do their theology, and not just to learn a series of ‘correct’ answers to be trotted out in sermons. So the life he created was all-embracing: Mass and the daily Office, lectures, housework, manual work – even sport – all were part of the day to day life of the College. Students lived alongside the Community, not in a separate building, and the Kelham way often saw senior tutors sweeping corridors and washing up under the direction of their students.

The Society survived a constitutional crisis in 1920 and the college continued to grow for the next forty years. A succession of visitors made their way to Kelham in what has been described as its ‘Golden Age’. These included T.S. Eliot and Dietrich Bonhoeffer. The Society also fostered theologians, educators and writers such as Gabriel Hebert, David Jenks, Reginald Tribe and George Every.

By the mid-1960s, in common with other religious institutions, numbers had declined at Kelham and it was closed as a theological college in 1972. The closure of Kelham brought to an end the Society’s work of training priests through the theological college system. Consequently the charism of SSM had to be reconsidered against the background of the challenges facing the Society after the loss of the natural recruiting ground for membership that had been provided by Kelham.

Today, Kelham Hall is a luxury wedding and events venue and a grade I listed building, with the associated monastic buildings of 1927-1929, including the chapel, being grade II listed.

== Priories ==
Over the years, the Society opened priories in various parts of England including Nottingham (1911-1974), the Liverpool docks (1932-1946), and Bedminster in Bristol (1934-1946). Continuing the SSM tradition of theological education, some of these Priories also provided chaplaincy in university settings, such as Lancaster (1969-1990) and Sheffield (1973-1980). Following the closure of Kelham, the Society began work at Willen in Milton Keynes (1973-2019), where they were invited to provide a ‘still centre on the edge of a new city’.

The post-Kelham era saw a great deal of experimentation in different ways of being SSM. Over a period spanning more than 45 years, various forms of community evolved at Willen, including 'The Well', which ran from the late 1997-2007. During the final phase of its existence, Willen reverted to a more traditional form of religious community, before declining numbers precipitated its closure in 2019.

The last priory to be established was in Durham where, in the 1980s, SSM took on the task of providing pre-theological training for would-be ordinands who lacked the necessary background to go into the selection process. A new chapel, designed by Sarah Menin, was built in 1990 and licensed for worship by David Jenkins, bishop of Durham on 1 October of that year. During the 2000s, St Antony’s developed into an Ecumenical Spirituality Project, which continued until 2018, when it once more became a direct operation of SSM. It is now the only remaining SSM operation in the UK.

In 2025, the Herbert Kelly Institute for Anglican Religious Life was established at St Antony’s, with a vision to both preserve the legacy and inform the future of religious life in the Church of England.

=== List of SSM Priories in England ===
1911–1974 Nottingham, St George’s

1932–1946 Liverpool

1934–1946 Bedminster, Bristol, St John’s

1937–1956 Sheffield, Parson’s Cross

1942–1949 Averham

1965–1990 Lancaster, Quernmore, St Paul’s Students did degrees at Lancaster University (St Martin’s College)

1973–1980 Sheffield, St Mark’s, Roslin Road

1973–2019 Willen Priory also ‘The Well’ (1997-2007)

1985–present Durham, St Antony’s also ‘Ecumenical Spirituality Project’ (early 2000s-2018)

== Current provinces and priories ==
The Society is organised into three autonomous provinces. These are now independent organisations, sharing a common name and history, but otherwise legally separate.

=== European province ===
Following the closure of St Michael's Priory, Willen, in 2019, the centre of operations moved to St Antony's Priory in Durham. In the years since, SSM has been through a process of transition from a religious order of professed members, governed by a Provincial and Chapter, to a religious organisation, a charity governed by a Board of Trustees, with a CEO directing operational activities delivered by a team of paid staff and volunteers.

It is no longer possible for the Society to admit new members; the four remaining professed members (three in England and one in Japan), live independently. The visitor is Stephen Conway, Bishop of Lincoln.

=== Southern African province ===
In 2008 the society completed a new purpose-built priory in Maseru, Lesotho, which is the current mother house of the province.

The provincial superior of the Southern African Province is Tanki Job Mofana. The visitor is Thabo Makgoba, Archbishop of Cape Town.

=== Australian province ===
The province was once very large, and undertook theological education and training of priests. The original mother house of the province, from 1947, was St Michael's Priory in Crafers. The role was taken over by the Priory at Diggers Rest, Victoria following the complete destruction of St Michael's Priory by fire, with a subsidiary priory in Adelaide. The province has since contracted in size, and now operates only St John's Priory at Adelaide.

The provincial superior of the Australian Province is Fr David McDougall. The visitor is John Stead, Bishop of Willochra.

== See also ==
- Hilary Greenwood, alumnus and last warden of Kelham Hall
- Theologisk Oratorium
