= David Murray (bishop) =

Anglican bishop

David Owen Murray was an Anglican bishop in the late 20th and early 21st centuries.

Murray trained for the priesthood at St Michael's House, Crafers, South Australia, and the Australian College of Theology and was ordained in 1969. His first post was at St Boniface's Cathedral, Bunbury. He then served at Lake Grace, Jerramungup and Mount Barker. He was Bishop of the Southern Region of the Anglican Diocese of Perth from 1991 until 2006.
