= Maribo =

Town in Denmark

- Town
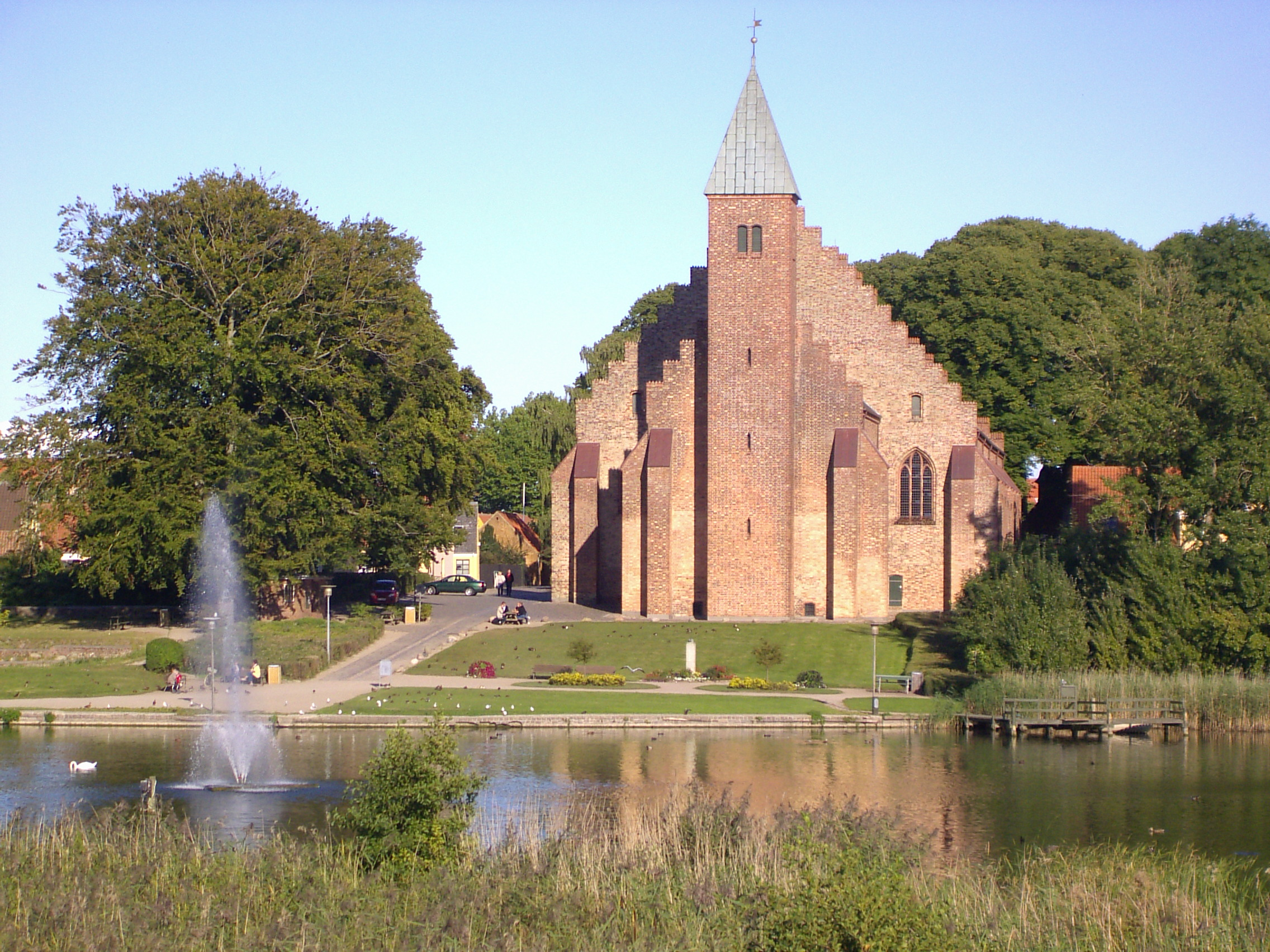
- Maribo Cathedral

- Coat of arms

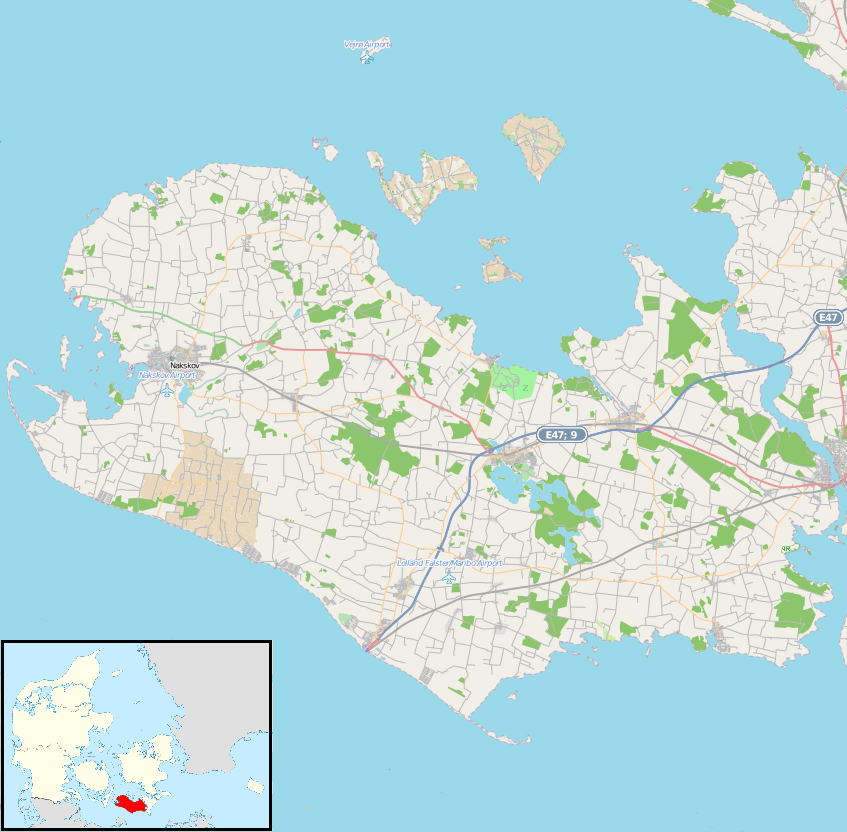
- Location on Lolland Maribo (Denmark Region Zealand) Maribo (Denmark)
- Coordinates: 54°46′29″N 11°30′4″E
- Country: Denmark
- Region: Region Sjælland
- Municipality: Lolland Municipality

Area
  - Urban: 4.1 km^{2} (1.6 sq mi)

Population (2026)
  - Urban: 5,783
  - Urban density: 1,400/km^{2} (3,700/sq mi)
  - Gender: 2,695 males and 3,088 females
- Time zone: UTC+1 (CET)
  - Summer (DST): UTC+2 (CEST)
- Postal code: DK-4930 Maribo

Maribo is a town in Lolland Municipality in Region Sjælland on the island of Lolland in south Denmark. It was the municipal seat of the former Maribo Municipality, until 1 January 2007, and then it became the seat of the current Lolland Municipality.

The merchant town of Maribo is located centrally on Lolland. Its population is 5,783 (1 January 2026). It has, among other facilities, a gymnasium (Secondary school), a public international school, an open-air museum and a cultural heritage museum.

A brewery, "Maribo Bryghus" used to be located in the town, but it was closed down in 2008 by its owner, Unibrew. Beer labeled "Maribo Øl" is still available, but it is brewed elsewhere.

== Surroundings ==
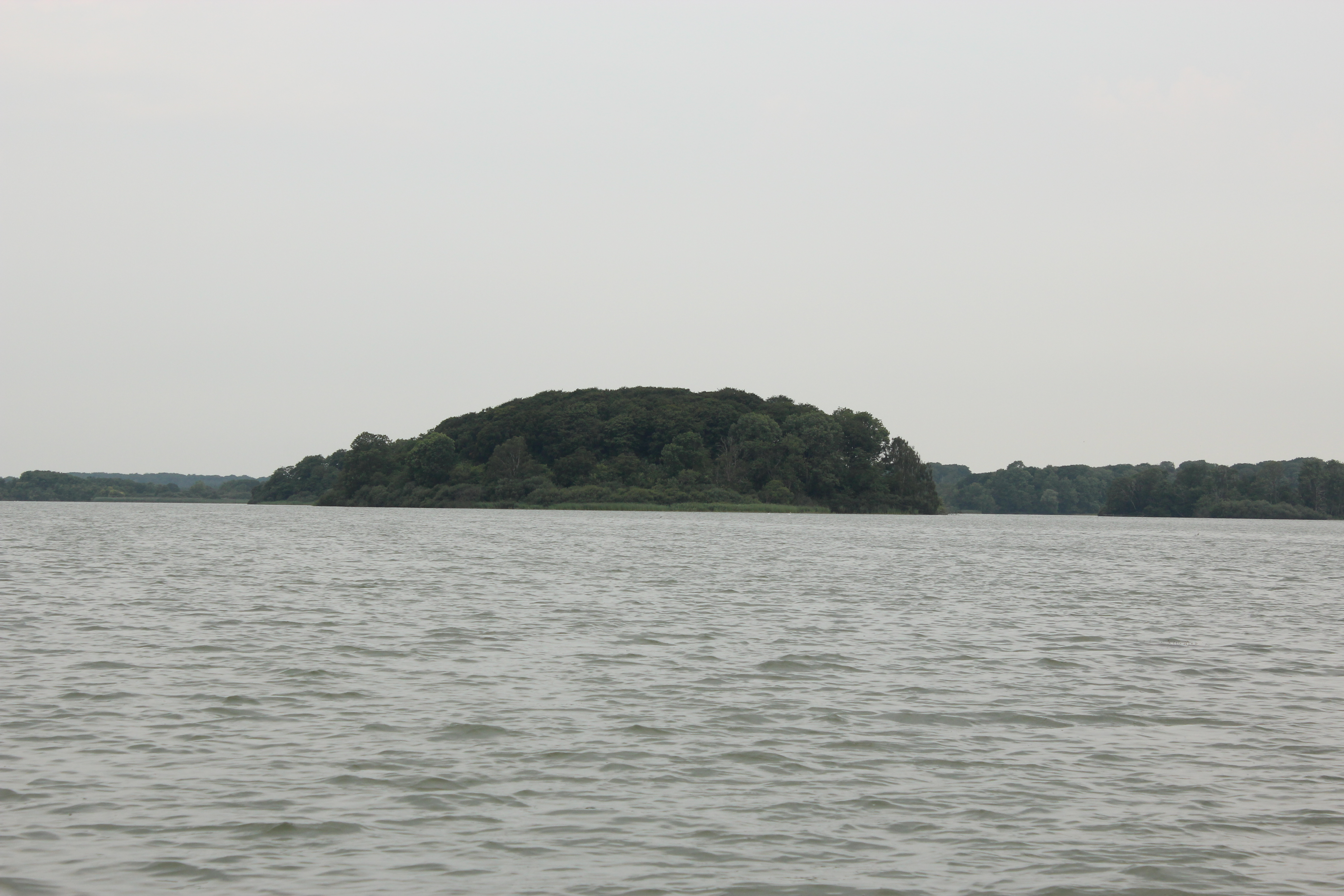
The small island of Hestø in Maribo Søndersø

Maribo is surrounded by Nørresø ("The Northern Lake" or "Northern Maribo Lake") to the north and Søndersø ("The Southern Lake" or "Southern Maribo Lake") to the south. Søndersø is, with an area of 852 hectare, the largest lake on Lolland. There are more islands in Søndersø than in any other lake in Denmark. These include the islands of Fruerø, Hestø, Præstø, Borgø, Lindø, Askø and Worsaaes. This is part of the Maribo Lakes Nature Park, which spans the towns of Maribo, Holeby, Sakskøbing and Nysted.

== History ==
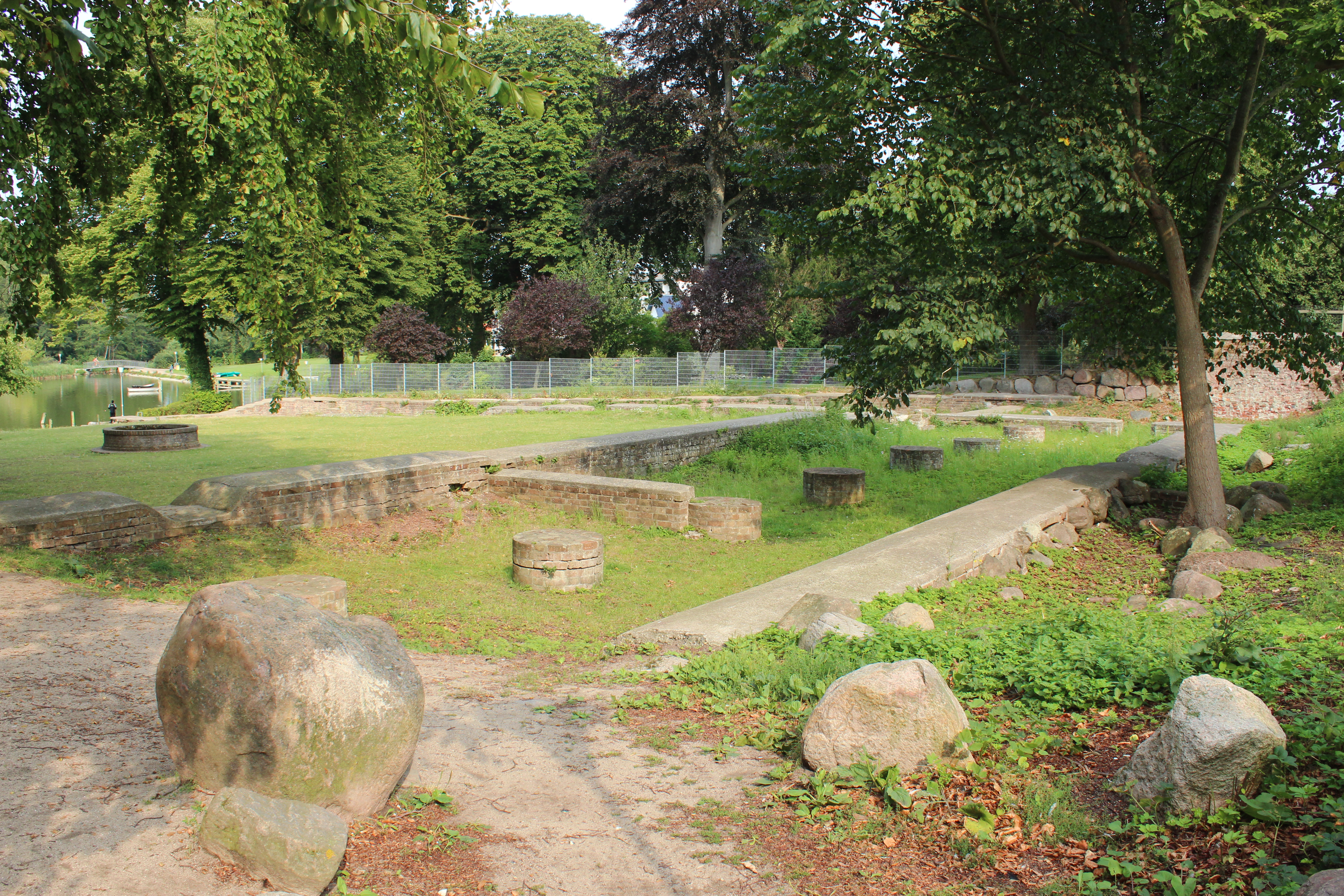
The ruins of Maribo Abbey

Saint Birgitta (1303–1373), also known as Birgitta of Vadstena, has cast her shadow on this municipality, and is shown on the municipality's coat-of-arms. Her order established the Bridgettine Order's Abbey in Maribo, when 1416 monks from Vadstena Abbey were sent to Maribo, then called Skimminge, to help establish a monastery.

In 1536, however, the abbey was abolished and transformed into a convent for noble virgins in 1556. After the old town church burned down in 1596, the abbey church then in place received status as town church.

King Christian IV's daughter, Leonora Christina Ulfeldt, was probably the abbey's most famous resident. In 1685 after her release from 21 years imprisonment for high treason from the Blue Tower (Blåtårn) in Copenhagen's Castle, she spent her final years in the then already dilapidated abbey, and was buried in a crypt at the church, until her body was removed shortly after the burial.

In 1803-1804 the islands of Lolland-Falster, which previously belonged to the Funen diocese, were made into an independent diocese, and the abbey church was given the status of the diocese's cathedral (domkirke) now known as Maribo Cathedral. The bishop, however, resides in Nykøbing Falster.

Several times during the 1800s the church has been secured against decline.

== Transport and Infrastructure ==
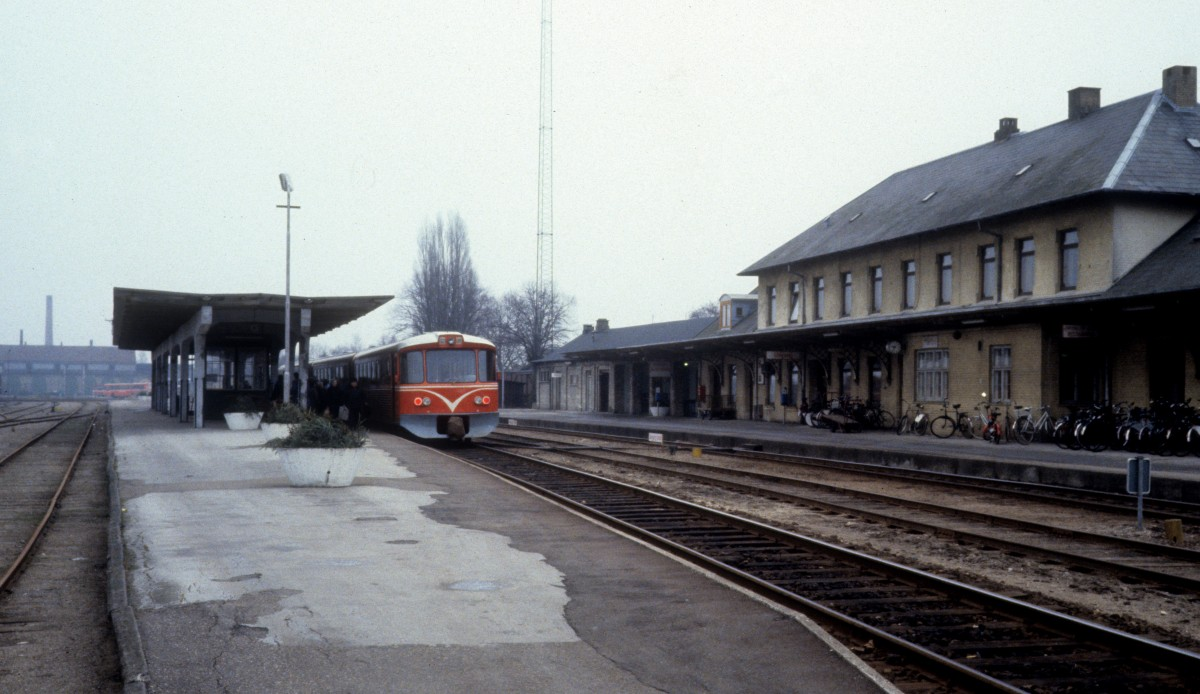
Maribo railway station

The town is served by Maribo railway station, located at Lollandsbanen, a railway line between Nykøbing Falster and Nakskov, which is operated by the railway company Lokaltog A/S since 2015.

Lolland Falster Airport is located south of Maribo between the towns of Holeby and Rødby.

== Maribo Municipality ==
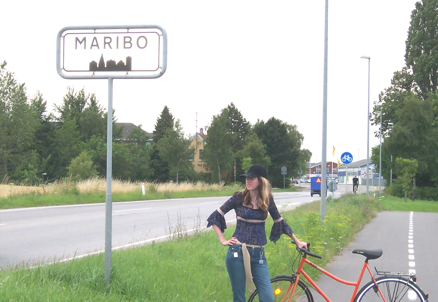
Maribo City Edge

Until 1 January 2007, Maribo was also a municipality (Danish, kommune) in the former Storstrøm County. The municipality, which included the islands of Askø ("Ash Island") and Lilleø ("little Island") in the Rågø Sound, covered an area of 154 km^{2}, and had a total population of 11,098 (2005). Its last mayor was Liljan Køcks, a member of the Socialist People's Party (Socialistisk Folkeparti) political party.

Maribo Municipality ceased to exist as the result of Kommunalreformen ("The Municipality Reform" of 2007). It was merged with Holeby, Højreby, Nakskov, Ravnsborg, Rudbjerg and Rødby municipalities to form the new Lolland Municipality. This created a municipality with an area of 892 km^{2} and a total population of 49,469 (2005).

== Notable people ==
- Peder Bergenhammer Sørensen (1914 in Maribo – executed 1944) a member of the Danish resistance
- Hanne Budtz (1915 - 2004) a lawyer and politician for the Conservative People's Party
- Marianne Gaarden (born 1964) a Danish prelate, installed in 2017 as Bishop of Lolland–Falster in Maribo Cathedral
- Simon Nagel (born 1985 in Maribo) a Danish professional football midfielder with 300 club caps
- Peter Tom-Petersen (1861–1926) a Danish painter and graphic artist, went to school in Maribo
- Jørgen Wichfeld (1729 at Engestofte – 1797) a landowner, industrialist and district judge
- Monica Wichfeld (1894–1945) a leading member of the Danish resistance during the German occupation of Denmark in WWII, lived on the Engestofte Estate in Maribo
- Richard Winther (1926 in Maribo - 2007) a Danish artist focused mainly on painting, graphics, photography and sculpture

== Sport ==
The handball team Team Sydhavsøerne plays in the Danish 1st Division.

== See also ==
- Maribo cheese
