= Herbert Kelly =

19th and 20th-century Anglican priest and founder of the Society of the Sacred Mission

The Reverend Herbert Kelly SSM
- Theologian and founder of the Society of the Sacred Mission
- Province: Church of England

Personal details
- Born: 18 July 1860 Manchester, England
- Died: 31 October 1950 (aged 90) Kelham, England
- Education: The Queen's College, Oxford

Herbert Hamilton Kelly SSM (18 July 1860 – 31 October 1950), a priest of the Church of England, was the founder of the Society of the Sacred Mission (SSM), an Anglican religious order. As a theologian, Kelly was influenced initially by Charles Kingsley and to more lasting effect by the writings of Frederick Denison Maurice, one of the founders of Christian socialism.

Between 1913 and 1919, Kelly served at the invitation of the Society for the Propagation of the Gospel and the Bishops of the Nippon Sei Ko Kai as Professor of Apologetics at the Anglican Central Theological College, Tokyo, Japan. During Kelly's years in Japan, he travelled to visit church communities in Brisbane, Manila and Korea.

== Early life and education ==
Kelly was born at St James's Vicarage, George Street, Manchester, the son of the Rev. James Davenport Kelly and his wife, Margaret Alice Eccles. He was educated at Manchester Grammar School. After army training at the Royal Military Academy, Woolwich, Kelly studied history at Queen's College, Oxford and was ordained in 1884.

As a theologian Kelly was influenced initially by Charles Kingsley, but to more lasting effect by the writing of Frederick Denison Maurice, especially in his two volumes entitled The Moral and Metaphysical Philosophy and The Kingdom of Christ. Kelly sought to explore the way in which a society and culture created "propositions" about God and then a church "system" that follows from such propositions. Although identified by others as Anglo-Catholic in his outlook, Kelly often stated that God and religion were not the same, challenging his own students to focus on issues of Faith and practical evangelism rather than the technicalities of church doctrine and administration.

Kelly's interest in the ecumenical movement involved him in the Student Christian Movement.

== SSM founder ==
While training people for missionary service in Korea and Africa, Kelly founded an Anglican religious order, the Society of the Sacred Mission, in Kennington, London in 1893. As the number of students increased, the order relocated to Mildenhall, Suffolk, and then in 1903 to Kelham Hall, Nottinghamshire. Kelly was succeeded as Director of the Society by Fr David Jenks in 1910.

== Academic role in Japan ==
Between 1913 and 1919 Kelly served at the invitation of the Society for the Propagation of the Gospel and the Bishops of the Nippon Sei Ko Kai as Professor of Apologetics at the Anglican Central Theological College, Tokyo, Japan.

After a lengthy journey via Canada and Beijing, Kelly arrived in Kobe on 19 February 1913. He was to reside in Ikebukuro, close to the campus of Rikkyo University until his final departure from Japan on 28 March 1919. During Kelly's years in Japan he returned to England in 1915 for meetings at Kelham and also travelled to visit church communities in Brisbane, Manila and Korea.

Kelly's influence on the development of the church in Japan was significant; a number of his students went on to leadership roles and helped to maintain the Nippon Sei Ko Kai's unique Anglican identification and independence through the political turmoil of the 1930s and Second World War. Michael Yashiro, one of Kelly's most loyal students, was elected Presiding Bishop of the Nippon Sei Ko Kai in August 1947.

== Works ==
- An Idea In the Working: An Account of the Society of the Sacred Mission, its History and Aims; Mowbray, 1908
- A History of the Church of Christ; Longmans, Green, 1901
- The Church and Religious Unity; Longmans, Green, 1913
- The Gospel of God; Student Christian Movement Press, 1928 (also 1959 by the same publisher)
- Catholicity; Student Christian Movement Press, 1932
- "No Pious Person: Autobiographical Recollections By Herbert Kelly", in: Herbert Hamilton Kelly, George Every; The Faith Press, 1960

== Source materials ==
- Bibliographic directory from Project Canterbury
- Heroes of the Faith: Herbert Kelly 1860-1950, The Church Observer, Easter 2006
- Notes on the Dedicated Life. Herbert Kelly by Michael Maasdorp SSM
