= Marianne Gaarden =

21st-century Lutheran bishop

The Right Reverend Marianne Gaarden
- Bishop of Lolland–Falster
- Church: Church of Denmark
- Diocese: Lolland–Falster
- Elected: 22 June 2017
- Installed: 10 September 2017
- Predecessor: Steen Skovsgaard

Orders
- Consecration: 1 September 2017 by Peter Skov-Jakobsen

Personal details
- Born: 4 February 1964 (age 62) Brønderslev, Denmark
- Denomination: Lutheran
- Spouse: Michael Schelde
- Children: 5
- Education: University of Copenhagen

Marianne Gaarden (born 4 February 1964) is a Danish prelate who is the 21st and current Bishop of Lolland-Falster.

== Biography ==
Gaarden is from Brønderslev, where she became a student at Brønderslev School in 1983. She subsequently went to Barcelona to study at an art school, where she graduated in 1990. Afterwards she commenced studies in theology at the University of Copenhagen, from which she graduated in 2005. That same year she finished he studies at the Copenhagen Seminary. Between 2006 and 2007 she was parish priest at Frederiksborg Castle Church in Hillerød. In 2007 she was appointed as parish priest of Præstø-Skibinge parish in the Diocese of Roskilde. Between 20110 and 2014 she undertook doctorate studies in business at Aarhus University. In 2015 she was appointed as theologian consultant for the Diocese of Helsingør with responsibility for priesthood training and counseling and guidance of church councils.

== Bishop ==
Upon the retirement of Steen Skovsgaard as Bishop of Lolland–Falster, an election was set up to find a successor. Four candidates were nominated for the post, including Gaarden. The first elections took place in May, where 2 candidates with the most votes were eligible for the second vote. Gaarden was the 2nd one with the most votes, a total of 126 votes. Her opponent, Christina Rygaard Kristiansen, received 146 votes. In the second vote Marianne Gaarden received 206 votes against 201 votes for Christina Rygaard Kristiansen. There were eight blank votes out of 415. Hence, Gaarden was selected bishop. She was consecrated bishop on 1 September 2017 and installed as Bishop of Lolland–Falster on 10 September 2017 in Maribo Cathedral.
