= Diocese of Lolland–Falster =

Diocese in Denmark

Diocese of Lolland–Falster Lolland–Falster Stift
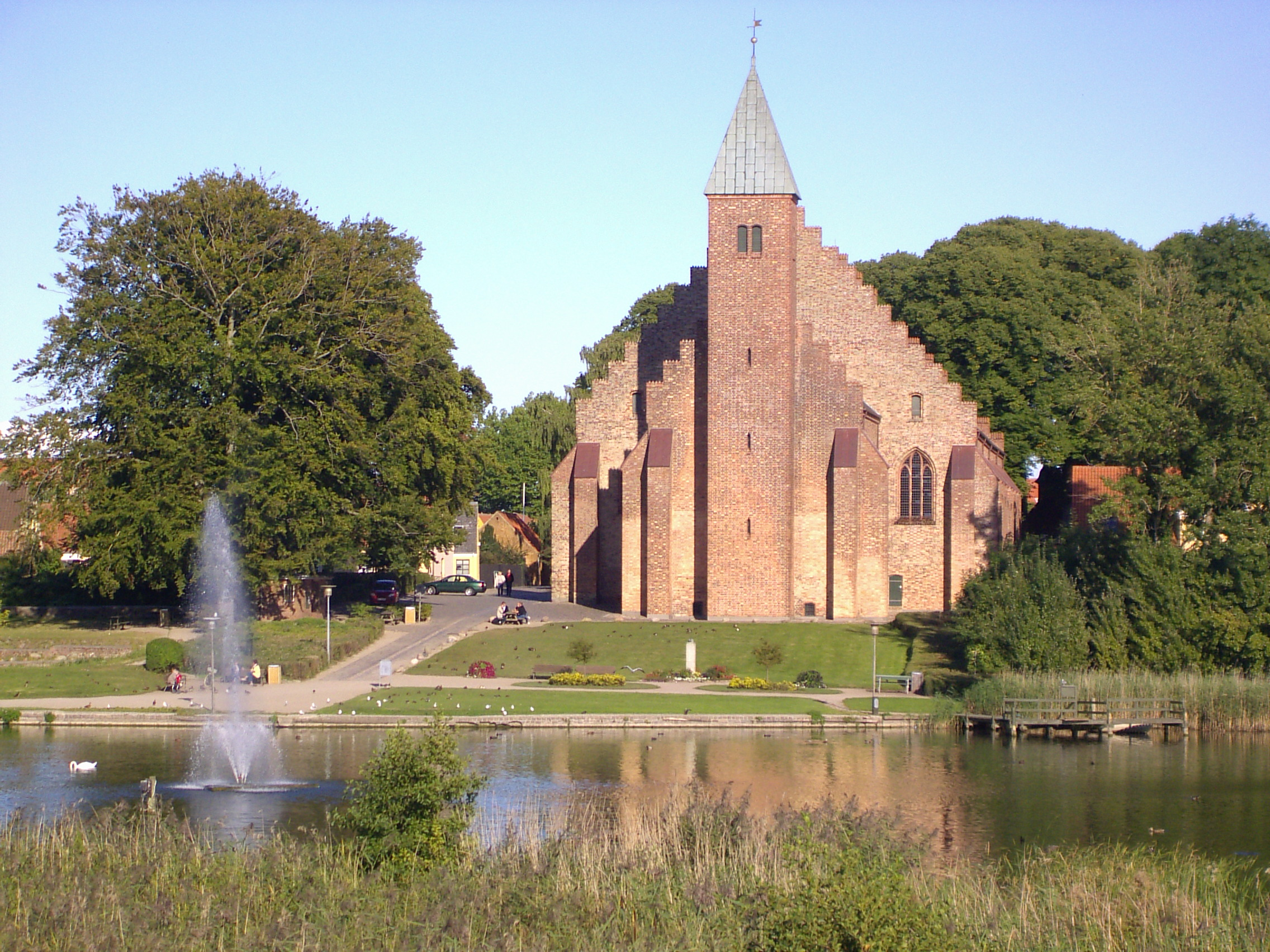
- Maribo Cathedral

Location
- Country: Denmark

Statistics
- Population: Total: (as of 2016); 103,542
- Members: 84,469 (81.2%)

Information
- Denomination: Church of Denmark
- Cathedral: Maribo Cathedral

Current leadership
- Bishop: Marianne Gaarden

Website
- Website of the Diocese

The Diocese of Lolland–Falster (Danish: Lolland–Falsters Stift) is a diocese within the Evangelical Lutheran Church of Denmark. It comprises Lolland and Falster as well as a number of smaller islands in the south-eastern corner of Denmark. The diocese was disjoined from the Diocese of Funen in 1803 and is the smallest of the 10 dioceses within the Danish state church. The main church is Maribo Cathedral in Maribo but the bishop resides in Nykøbing Falster.

== Subdivisions ==
Since 1 January 2007, the diocese is divided into the following provosties:

- Maribo Domprovsti (Maribo Cathedral)
- Lolland Vestre Provsti (Western Lolland)
- Lolland Østre Provsti (Eastern Lolland)
- Falster Provsti (Falster)

== Bishops of Lolland–Falster ==
- 1803–1805: Andreas Birch
- 1805–1831: Peter Outzen Boisen
- 1831–1842: Rasmus Møller
- 1843–1845: Gerhard Peter Brammer
- 1845–1848: Peter Christian Stenersen Gad
- 1849–1854: Ditlev Gothard Monrad (1st term)
- 1854–1856: Jørgen Hjort Lautrup
- 1856–1871: Severin Claudius Wilken Bindesbøll
- 1871–1887: Ditlev Gothard Monrad (2nd term)
- 1887–1899: Hans Valdemar Sthyr
- 1899–1903: Henrik Christian von Leuenbach
- 1903–1907: Hans Sophus Sørensen
- 1907–1923: Caspar Frederik Johansen Wegener
- 1923–1942: Johan John Aschlund Ammundsen
- 1942–1950: Niels Munk Plum
- 1950–1964: Halfdan Høgsbro
- 1964–1969: Haldor Hald
- 1969–1996: Thorkild E. Græsholt
- 1996–2005: Holger Jepsen
- 2005–2017: Steen Skovsgaard
- 2017–present: Marianne Gaarden

== Stiftsamtmand office holders ==
- 1737–1763: Christian Frederik Raben
- 1850–1885: Frederik Christian von Holsten
- 1885–1886: Iver Emil Hermann William Unsgaard
- 1890–1903: Conrad Alexander Fabritius de Tengnagel
- 1903–1912: Gustav Hakon Valdemar Feddersen
- 1912–19??: Waldemar Oxholm

== See also ==
- List of churches on Falster
- List of churches on Lolland
