= Stiftsmuseum Maribo =

Danish museum

Coordinates: 54°46′35″N 11°30′07″E

Stiftsmuseum Maribo, also known as the Maribo County Museum, is a museum located in the centre of Maribo on the Danish island of Lolland. Its archeological and cultural heritage collections are housed in a specially designed building completed in 1890. Currently the exhibits include rustic furniture from Toreby, a variety of old clocks and the Maribo book collection consisting of some 2,000 volumes. There is also a complete set of the 18th-century Flora Danica illustrations of plants and flowers.

Funded by donations from the local population, the museum was designed by the architect Ove Petersen (1830–1892) who also designed the Royal Danish Theatre in Copenhagen.
