= Regin Prenter =

Regin Prenter (6 November 1907 Frederikssund – 15 December 1990) was a Danish Lutheran priest and theologian.

Prenter studied theology at Copenhagen, where he belonged to the founding circle of Theologisk Oratorium and became friend of Fr Gabriel Hebert, SSM.

He had candidate's degree in theology in 1931 and became priest in Hvilsager-Lime and the Aarhus Cathedral. 1935-36 he spent a year at Lincoln Theological College where he came under influence of Michael Ramsey. Later he took part in many Anglican-Lutheran conferences. During W.W.II Prenter was active in the resistance movement against the Nazis and had doctors degree in theology in 1944 about Martin Luther's theology. 1945-1972 he was professor of dogmatics at the Aarhus University.

During that time he was 1950-1957 chairman of the Commission of Theology of the Lutheran World Federation and 1961-1962 chairman of the Commission of Worship of the World Council of Churches. His work on Christian doctrine, ”Skabelse og Genløsning” (Creation and redemption), 1955, has been translated into English, German, French, and Japanese. 1972-1977 Prenter worked as a parish priest of Branderup.

== Selected works in English ==
- Spiritus Creator: Luther's concept of the Holy Spirit. Muhlenberg Press, 1953, 311 p.
- The Word and the Spirit: Essays on Inspiration of the Scriptures. Augsburg Pub. House, 1965. 163 p.
- Creation and redemption, Fortess Press, 1967. 596 p.
- The Church's Faith: A Primer of Christian Beliefs. Fortress Press, 1968. 224 p.
