= Lists of bridges =

The list of bridges contains various notable bridges around the world. The list is sorted by continent, and within continents, sorted alphabetically by country.

== Africa ==
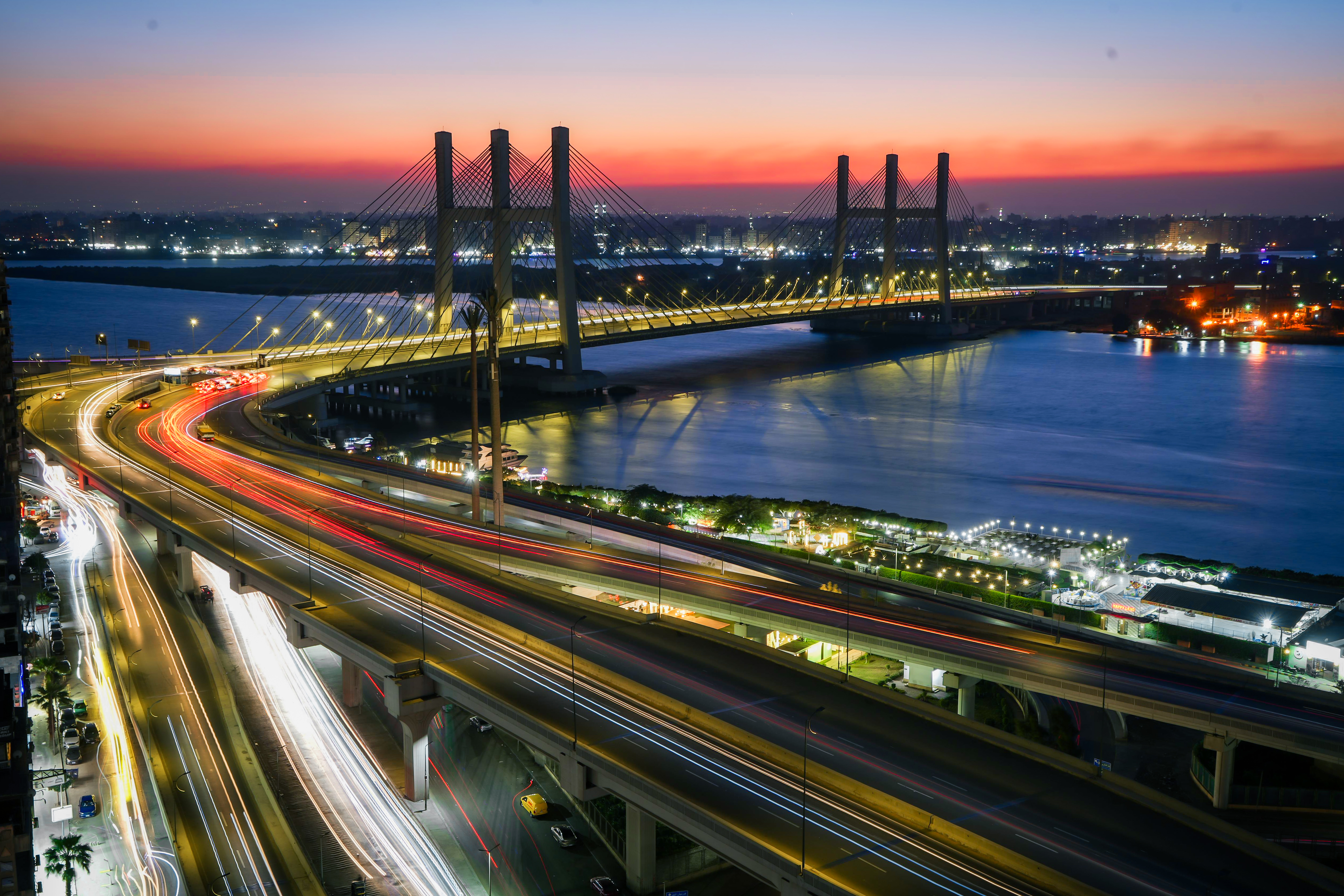
Tahya Misr Bridge

=== Algeria ===
- Ouadi El Roukham Bridge

=== Botswana ===
- Kazungula Bridge (connects with Zambia)

=== Egypt ===
- Suez Canal Bridge
- Rod El Farag Axis Bridge, the world's widest suspension bridge in the world.
- Aswan Bridge
- 6th October Bridge
- Stanley Bridge
- El Ferdan Railway Bridge
- Qasr El Nil Bridge
- Imbaba Bridge

=== Ghana ===
- Adome Bridge

=== Libya ===
- Wadi el Kuf Bridge

=== Mozambique ===
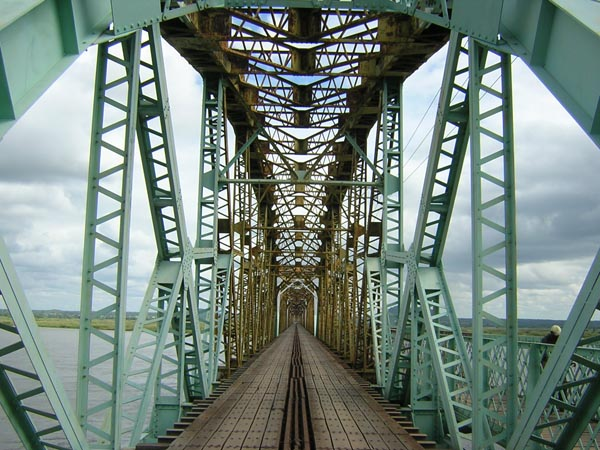
Dona Ana Bridge

- Dona Ana Bridge
- Unity Bridge

=== Namibia ===
- Katima Mulilo Bridge

=== Nigeria ===
- Carter Bridge
- Eko Bridge
- Third Mainland Bridge

=== Réunion ===
- Bras de la Plaine Bridge

=== South Africa ===
- Bloukrans Bridge
- Grayston Pedestrian and Cycle Bridge
- Hennie Steyn Bridge
- Nelson Mandela Bridge
- Paul Sauer Bridge
- Van Stadens Bridge

=== Zimbabwe and Zambia ===
- Victoria Falls Bridge – linking Zimbabwe to Zambia, built in 1905 as part of the projected Cape-Cairo railway.

== Asia ==
=== Bahrain ===
- King Fahd Causeway

=== Bangladesh ===
- Jamuna Bridge
- Rupsha Bridge
- Padma Bridge
- Lalon Shah Bridge
- Shah Amanat Bridge
- Khan Jahan Ali Bridge
- Payra Bridge
- Hardinge Bridge

=== Cambodia ===
- Monivong Bridge
- Prek Tamak Bridge
- Chroy Changva Bridge
- Koh Kong Bridge
- Kizuna Bridge
- Stung Treng Bridge
- Neak Loeung Bridge
- Prek Kdam Bridge
- Prek Pnov Bridge

=== China ===
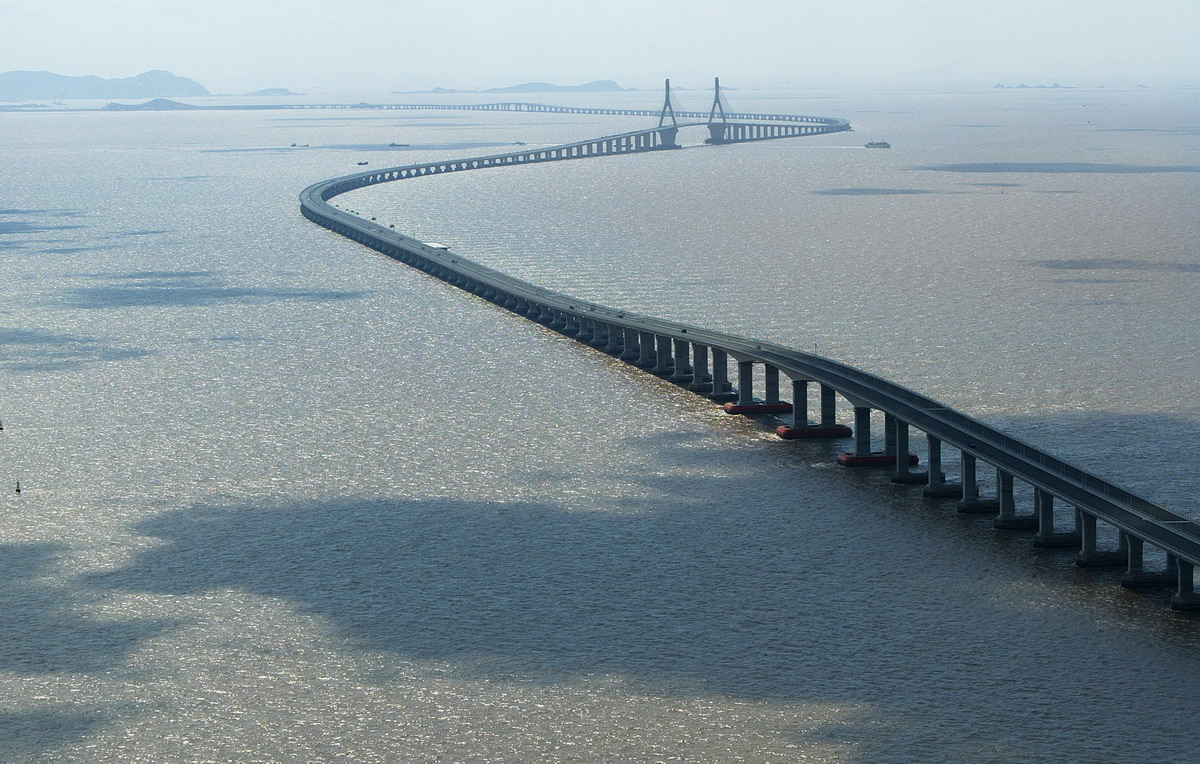
The Donghai Bridge, China is the second longest cross-sea bridge in the world

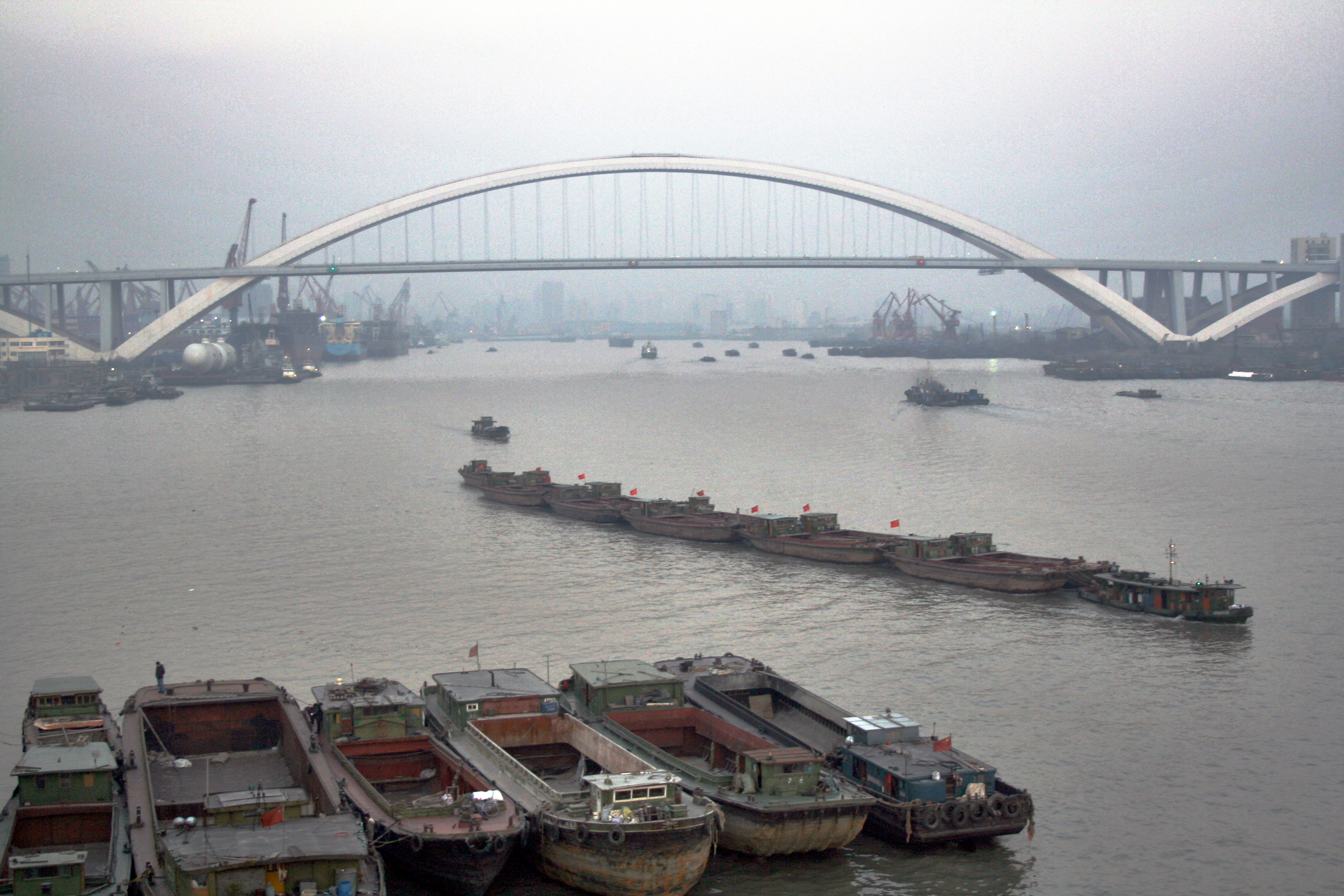
The Lupu Bridge, China

- Donghai Bridge—Second-longest over-sea bridge
- Duge Bridge—Highest bridge in the world as of late 2016
- Lupu Bridge
- Shanghai Yangtze River Bridge
- Tongling Bridge
- Wuhu Yangtze River Bridge

=== India ===
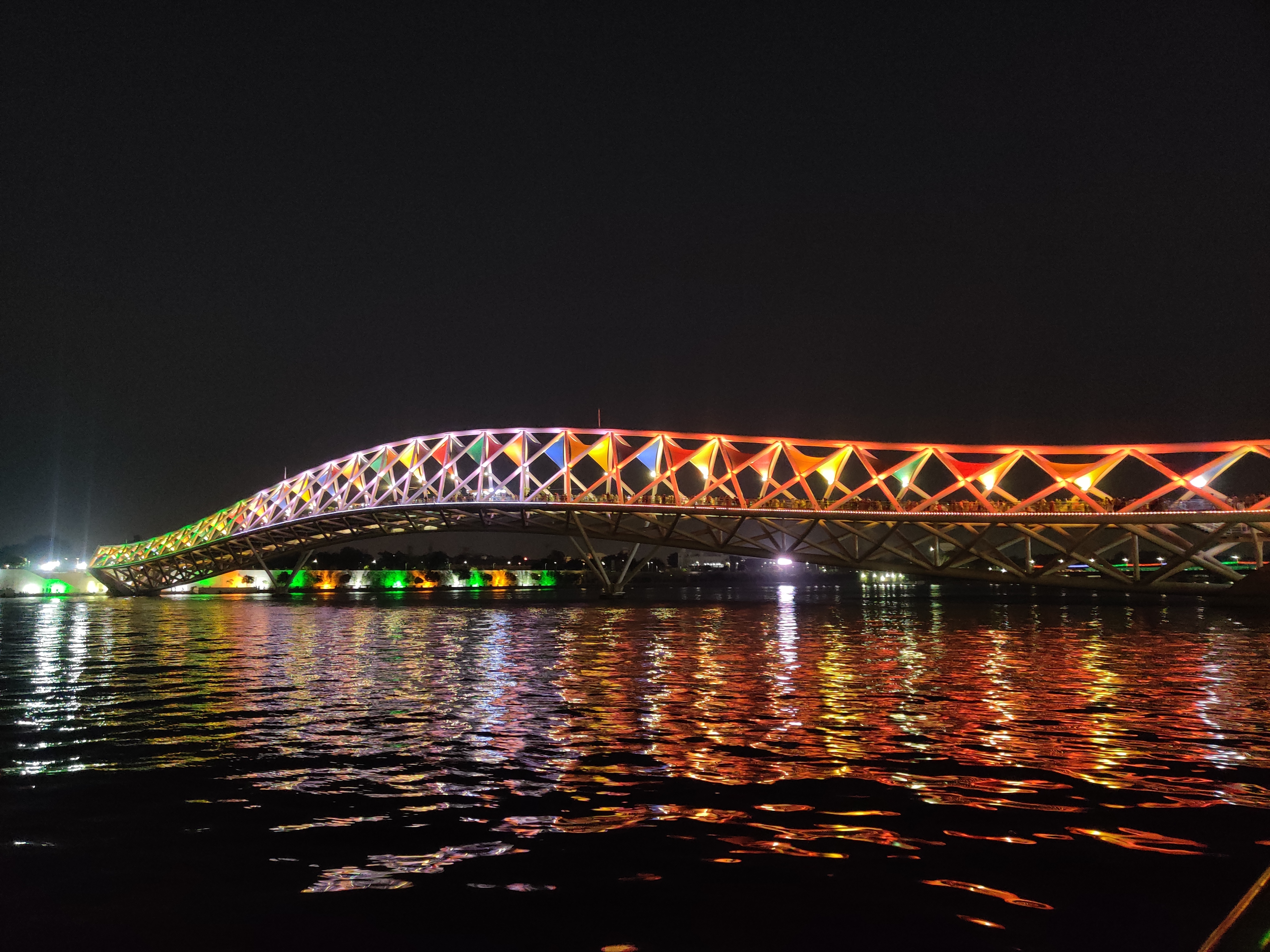
Atal Pedestrian Bridge in Ahmedabad

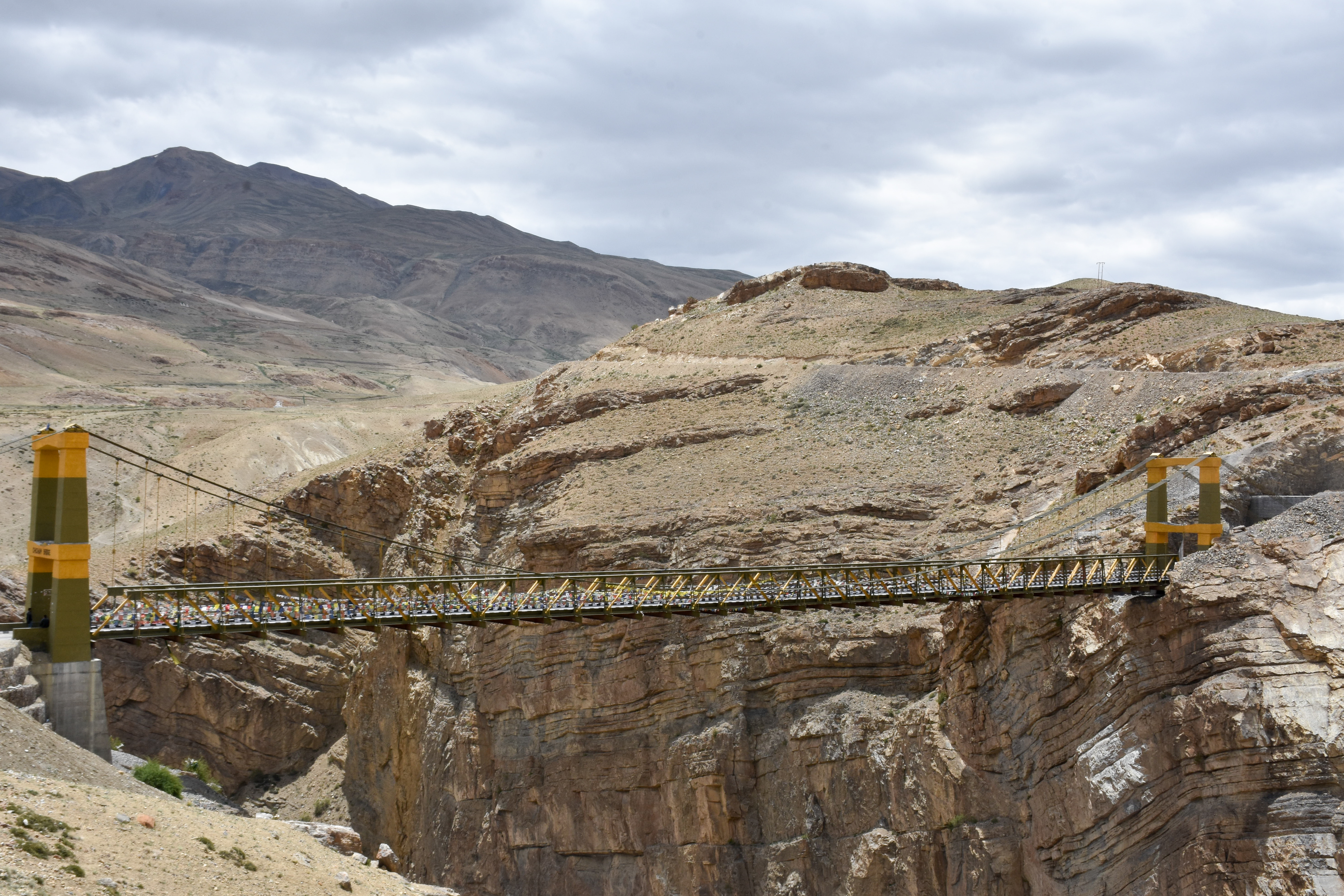
Chicham Bridge is Asia's one of the highest bridge, the deck is 150m above spiti valley

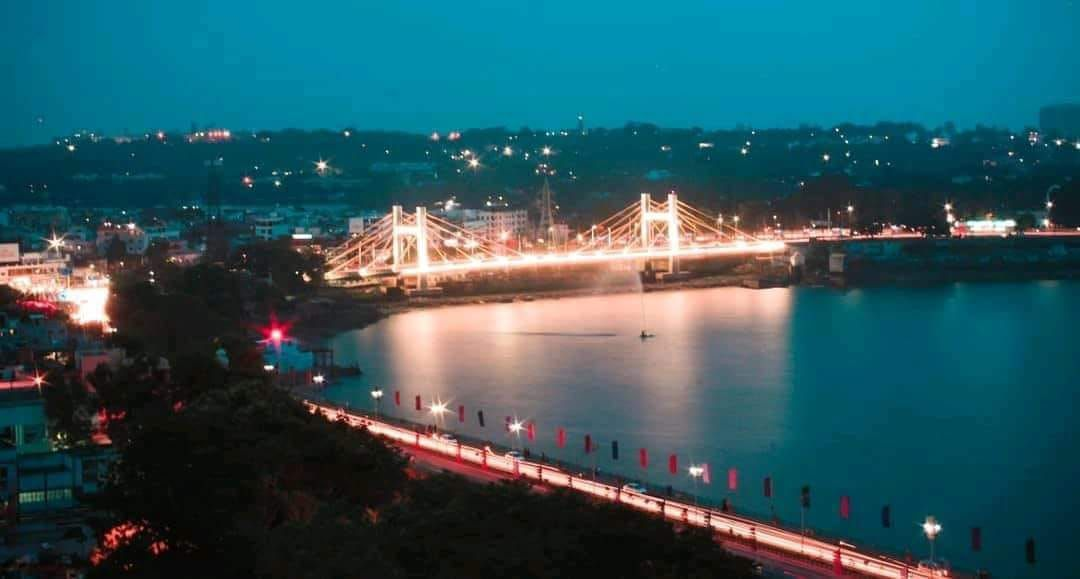
Raja Bhoj Setu in Bhopal

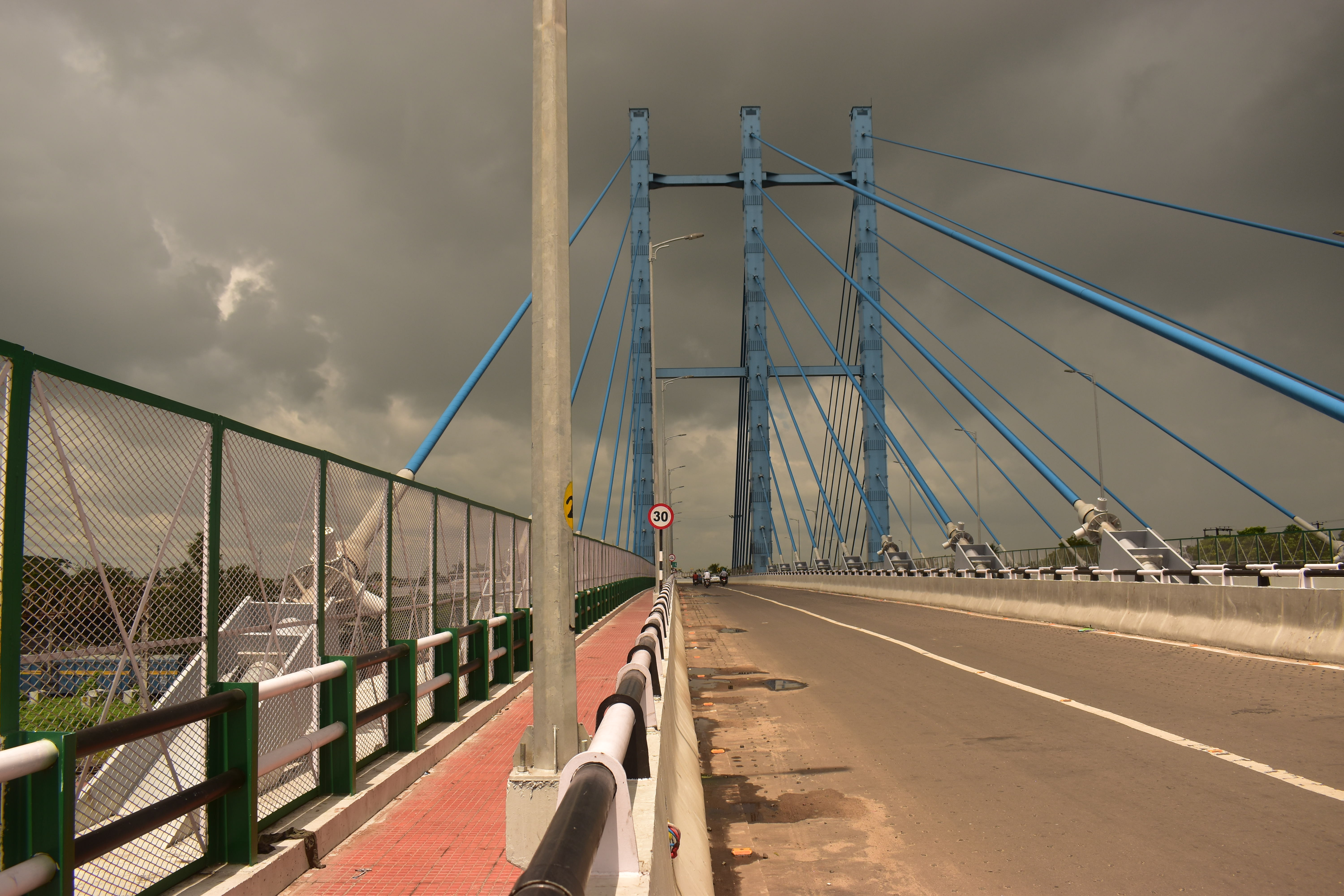
Burdwan Hanging Railway Bridge

- Atal Pedestrian Bridge
- Atal Setu, Goa
- Bandra–Worli Sea Link
- Coronation Bridge
- Durgam Cheruvu Bridge
- Ellis Bridge
- Godavari Bridge, Rajahmundry
- Golden Bridge
- Howrah Bridge, the busiest cantilever bridge in the world
- Jubilee Bridge
- Kacchi Dargah–Bidupur Bridge
- Kalwa Bridge
- Kolia Bhomora Setu
- Mahatma Gandhi Setu
- Majerhat Bridge
- Mumbai Trans Harbour Link
- Napier bridge
- Nehru Setu or Sone Bridge
- Nehru Bridge
- New Yamuna Bridge, Allahabad
- Nivedita Setu
- Pamban Bridge
- Phaphamau New Bridge, prayagraj (upcoming longest bridge in india).
- Ponte Conde de Linhares
- P. V. Narasimha Rao Expressway, Hyderabad
- Ram Jhula, Nagpur
- Saraighat Bridge
- Vashi Bridge
- Vembanad Rail Bridge, Kochi
- Vidyasagar Setu
- Vivekananda Setu
- Prakasam Barrage, Vijayawada
- Kanpur over-bridge
- Kolia Bhomora Setu
- Kota Chambal Bridge
- Panipat Elevated Expressway
- Adam's Bridge
- Mothoor hanging bridge

=== Indonesia ===
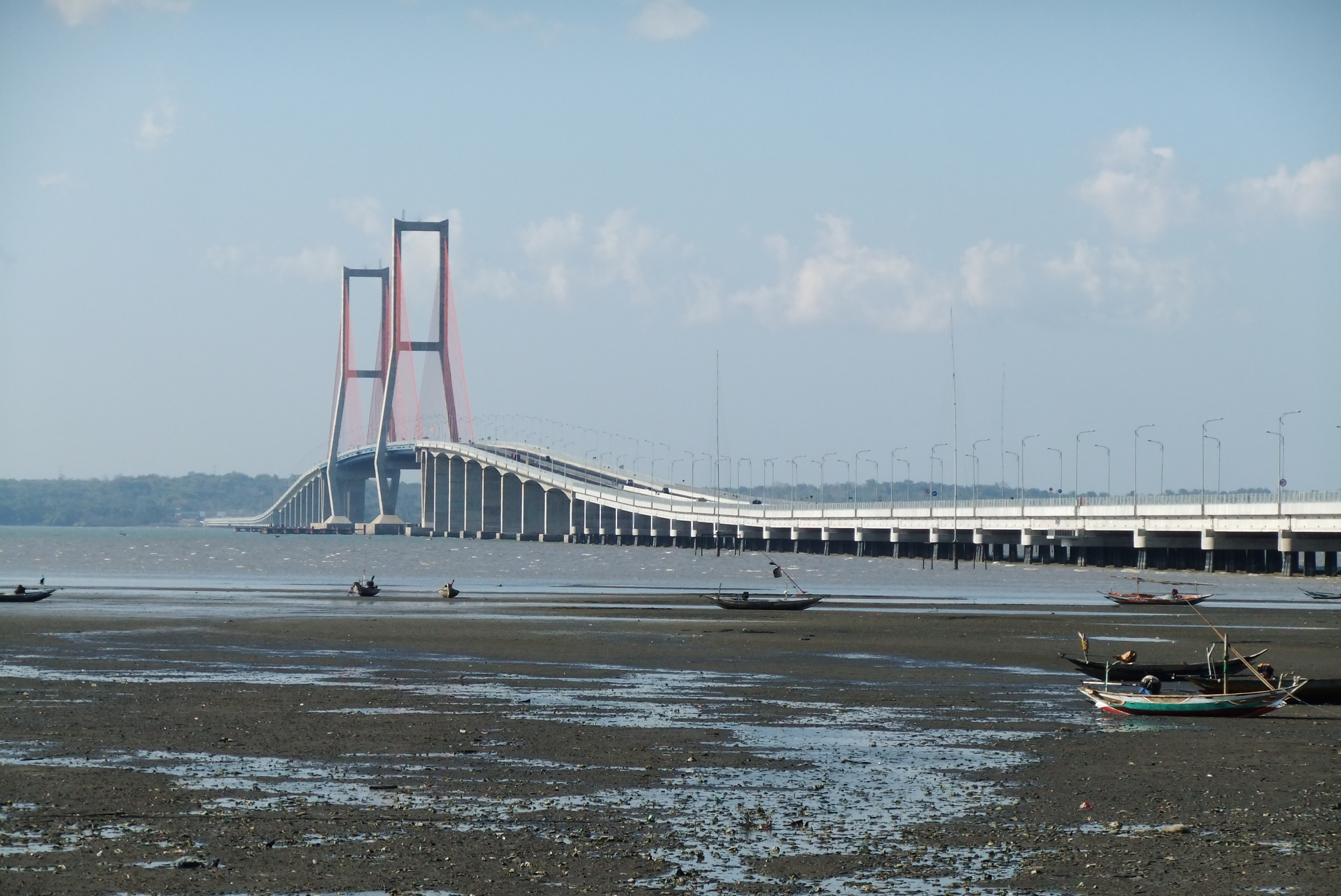
Suramadu Bridge from Surabaya side

- Barelang Bridge, Riau Islands
- Ampera Bridge, South Sumatra
- Suramadu Bridge, East Java
- Barito Bridge, South Kalimantan
- Kahayan Bridge, Central Kalimantan
- Kenjeran Bridge, Surabaya, East Java
- Kutai Kartanegara Bridge, East Kalimantan
- Tayan Bridge, West Kalimantan
- Youtefa Bridge, Papua
- Merah Putih Bridge, Maluku
- Pasupati Bridge, Bandung, West Java
- Kelok Sembilan Bridge, West Sumatra – Riau
- Palu IV Bridge, Palu, Central Sulawesi

=== Iran ===
- Khaju Bridge
- Kohneh Bridge
- Shahrestan bridge
- Si-o-se Pol
- Vahid Bridge
- Veresk Bridge
- Old Bridge of Dezful
- Tabiat Bridge

=== Iraq ===
- Al-Aaimmah bridge
- Al-Sarafiya bridge

=== Israel ===
- Ad Halom
- Allenby Bridge
- Chords Bridge
- Emek Ayalon Bridge
- Zohar Bridge

=== Japan ===
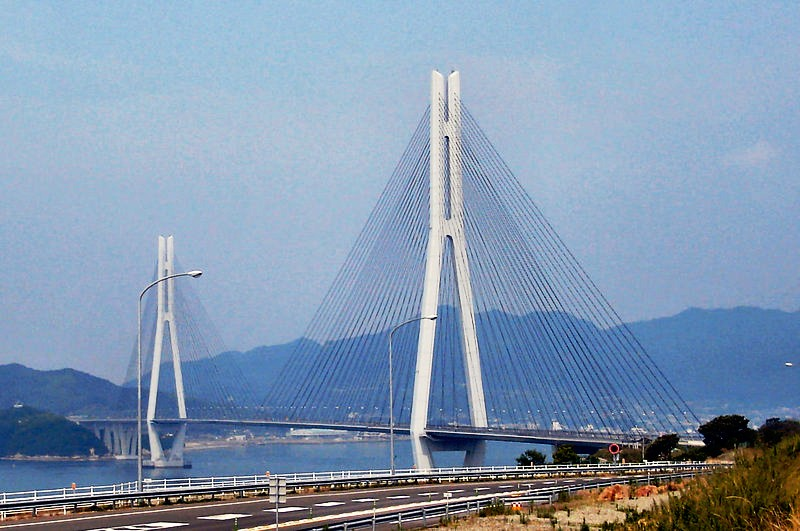
The cable-stayed Tatara Bridge has an 860 m span

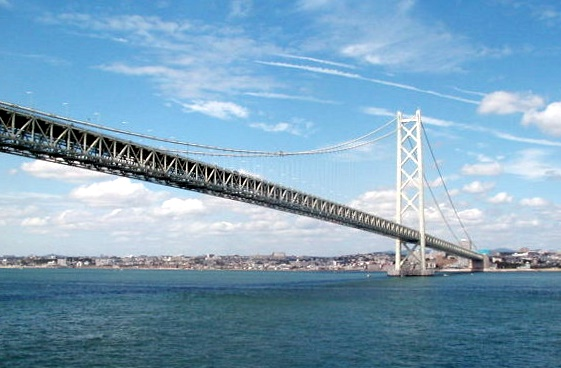
The Akashi Kaikyō Bridge has the largest span of any bridge

- Aioi Bridge, Hiroshima
- Akashi Kaikyō Bridge, the longest suspension bridge in the world
- Akinada Bridge
- Bandai Bridge
- Chikugo River Lift Bridge
- Great Seto Bridge
- Hakata–Ōshima Bridge
- Hakuchō Bridge
- Hirado Bridge
- Hitsuishijima Bridge
- Honshū–Shikoku Bridge Project
- Hōrai Bridge the longest wood bridge in the world
- Innoshima Bridge
- Iwakurojima Bridge
- Kanmon Bridge
- Kansai International Airport access bridge ("The Sky Gate Bridge R")
- Kintai Bridge
- Kita Bisan–Seto Bridge
- Konohana Bridge
- Kurushima-Kaikyō Bridge
- Meiko Nishi Ohashi roadway bridges
- Minami Bisan–Seto Bridge
- Minato Bridge
- Nihonbashi
- Ōnaruto Bridge
- Rainbow Bridge
- Shimotsui–Seto Bridge
- Tatara Bridge
- Tokyo Bay Aqua-Line
- Tokyo Gate Bridge
- Tsūjun Bridge
- Tsurumi Tsubasa Bridge
- Wakato Narrows Bridge
- Yokohama Bay Bridge
- Yoshima Bridge

=== Jordan ===
- Abdoun Bridge
- King Hussein Bridge

=== Kazakhstan ===
- Ramstore Bridge
- Semey Bridge

=== Korea, North ===
- Bridge of No Return
- Sino–Korean Friendship Bridge (Sinŭiju)

=== Korea, South ===
- Bridge of No Return
- Cheongdam Bridge
- Dangsan Railway Bridge
- Dongho Bridge
- Dongjak Bridge
- Gimpo Bridge
- Gwangan Bridge
- Hannam Bridge
- Han River Bridge
- Incheon Bridge
- Namhae Bridge
- Noryang Bridge
- Magok Bridge
- Mapo Bridge
- Olympic Bridge
- Seohae Bridge
- Seogang Bridge
- Seongsan Bridge
- Seongsu Bridge
- Seonimgyo Bridge
- Yanghwa Bridge
- Yeongdo Bridge
- Yeongdong Bridge
- Yeongjong Bridge
- Yi Sun-sin Bridge
- Wonhyo Bridge

=== Laos ===
- First Thai–Lao Friendship Bridge
- Second Thai–Lao Friendship Bridge
- Third Thai–Lao Friendship Bridge
- Fourth Thai–Lao Friendship Bridge

=== Malaysia ===
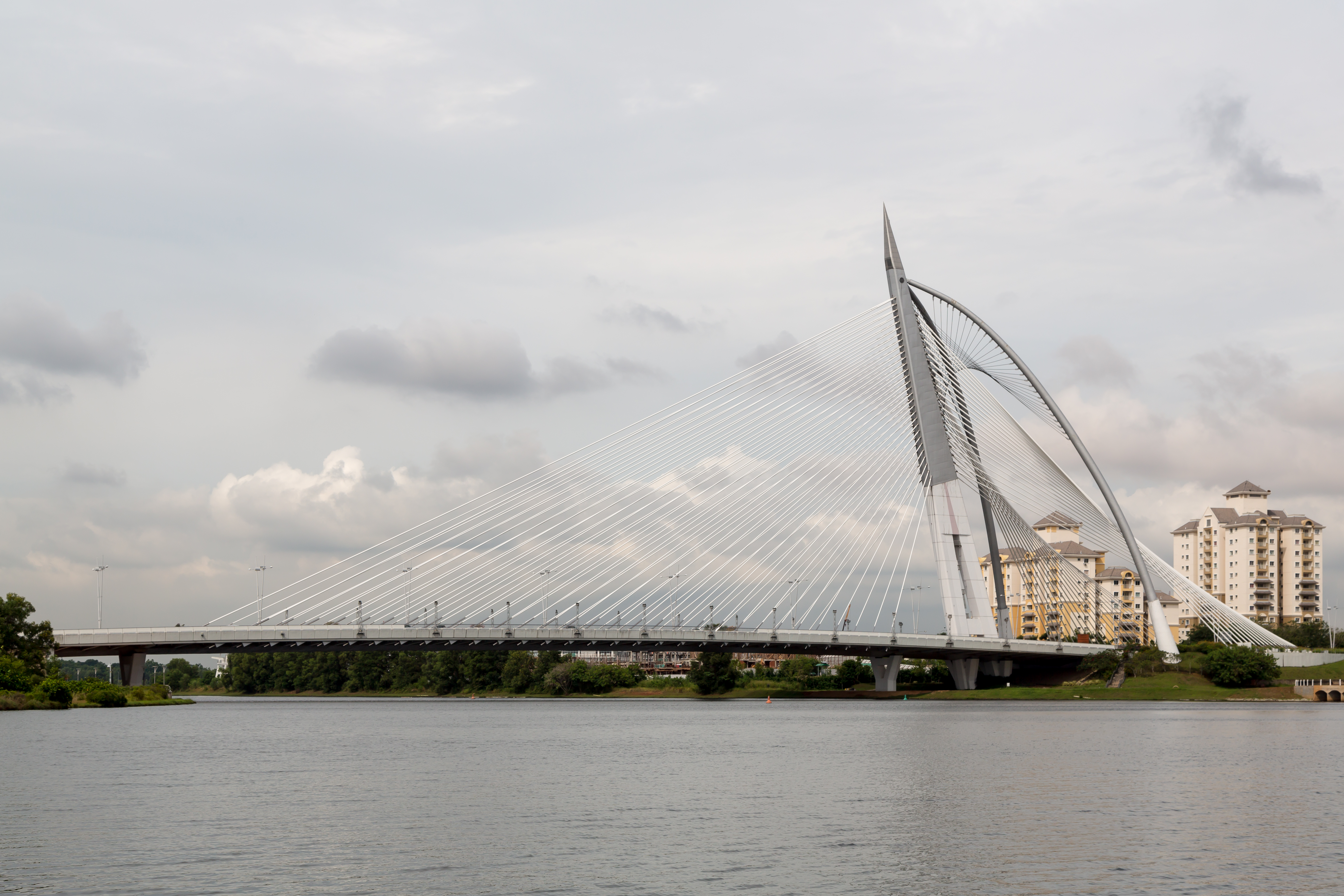
Seri Wawasan Bridge

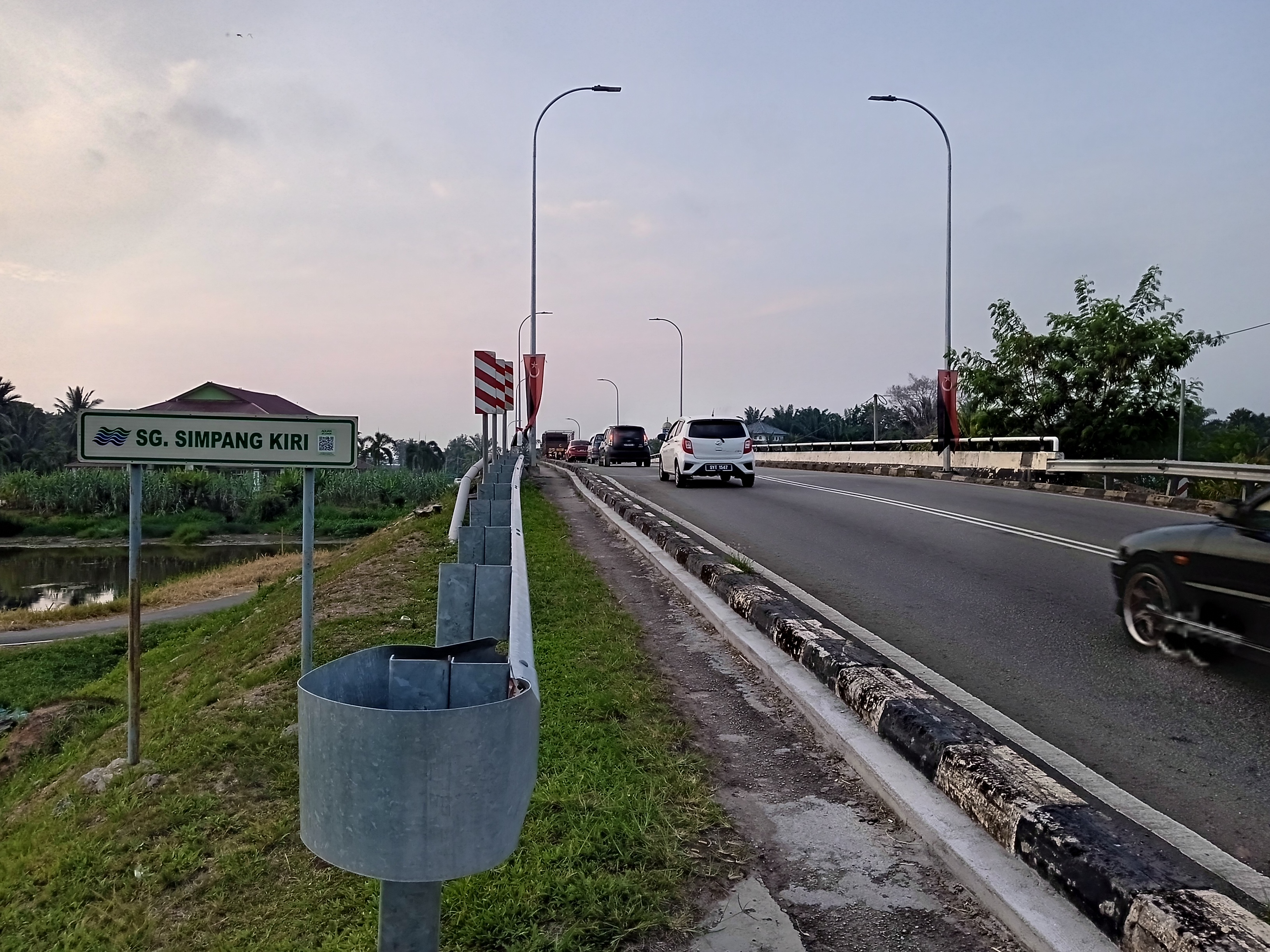
Parit Sulong Bridge

- Batang Baram Bridge
- Batang Lupar 1 Bridge
- Bukit Bunga-Ban Buketa Bridge
- Buloh Kasap Bridge
- Connaught Bridge
- Dabong Bridge
- Jambatan Iskandariah
- Jambatan Kota
- Jambatan Raja Pemaisuri Bainun
- Jambatan Sultan Abdul Jalil Shah
- Jambatan Sultan Abu Bakar
- Jambatan Sultan Ahmad Shah
- Jambatan Sultan Azlan Shah
- Jambatan Sultan Idris Shah II
- Jambatan Sultan Salahuddin Abdul Aziz Shah
- Jambatan Sultan Yusuf
- Kuala Krai Bridge
- Lake Temenggor Bridge
- Malaysia–Singapore Second Link
- Merdeka Bridge, Malaysia
- Monorail Suspension Bridge
- Muar Second Bridge
- Parit Sulong Bridge
- Penang Bridge
- Penang Second Bridge
- Permas Jaya Bridge
- Prai River Bridge
- Pulau Bunting Bridge
- Putra Bridge
- Selat Lumut Bridge
- Seri Bakti Bridge
- Seri Bestari Bridge
- Seri Gemilang Bridge
- Seri Perdana Bridge
- Seri Saujana Bridge
- Seri Setia Bridge
- Seri Wawasan Bridge
- Sultan Ahmad Shah II Bridge
- Sultan Ismail Bridge
- Sultan Ismail Petra Bridge
- Sultan Mahmud Bridge
- Sungai Johor Bridge
- Sungai Linggi Bridge
- Sultan Yahya Petra Bridge
- Victoria Bridge, Malaysia

=== Myanmar ===
- Anawrahta Bridge
- Attaran Bridge
- Ava Bridge
- Dedaye Bridge
- Hsinbyushin Bridge
- Irrawaddy Bridge
- Kattel Bridge
- Kyungon Bridge
- Maha Bandula Bridge
- Pakokku Bridge
- Sittaung Bridge (Moppalin)
- Tarsan Bridge
- Thanlwin Bridge (Mawlamyine)
- Thanlyin Bridge
- Thanlyin Bridge 2
- Thegon Bridge
- U Bein Bridge

=== Philippines ===
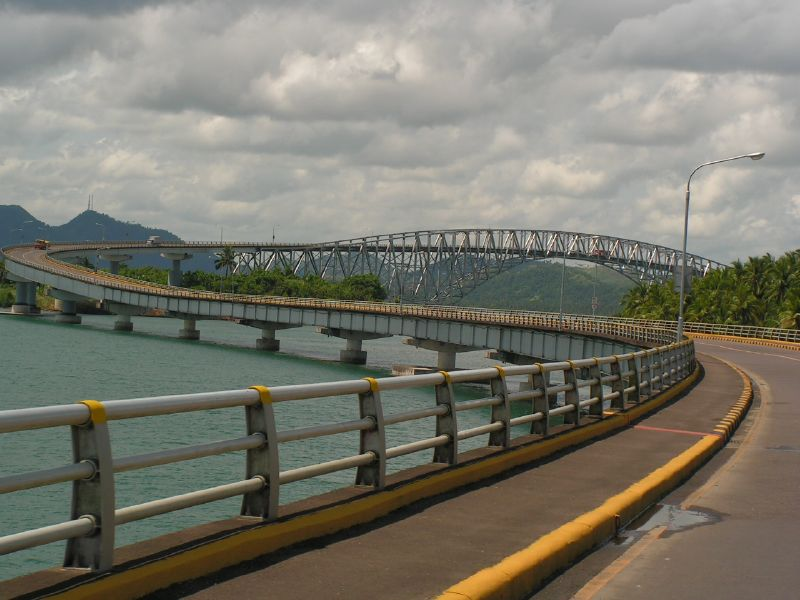
San Juanico Bridge

- Candaba Viaduct
- Buntun Bridge
- Mactan-Mandaue Bridge
- Magapit Suspension Bridge
- Marcelo Fernan Bridge
- Quezon Bridge
- San Juanico Bridge

=== Qatar ===
- Qatar–Bahrain Friendship Bridge

=== Saudi Arabia ===
- Jamarat Bridge
- King Fahd Causeway

=== Syria ===
- Deir ez-Zor suspension bridge

=== Taiwan ===
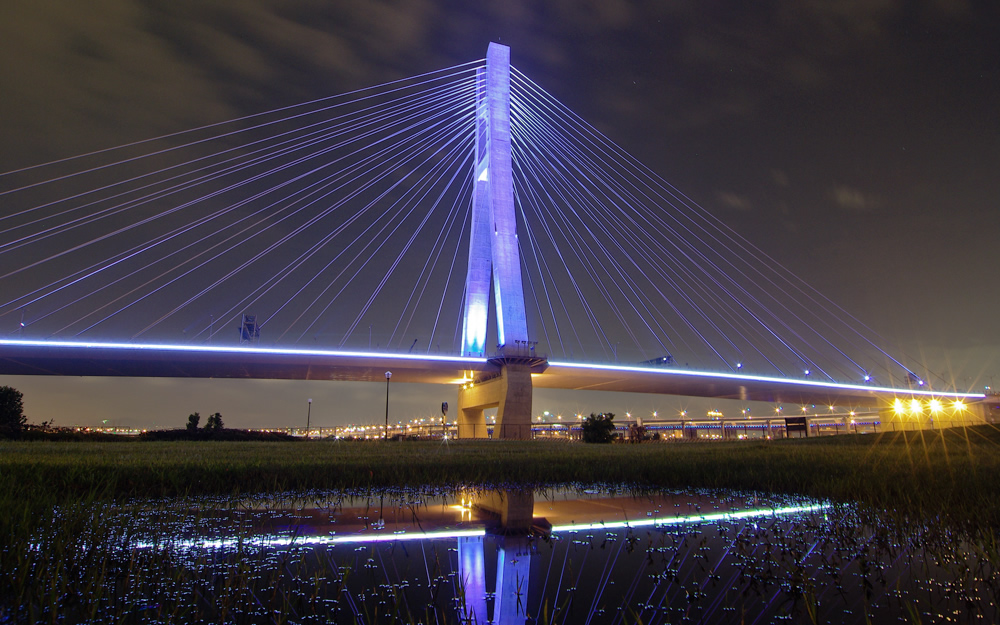
New Taipei Bridge

=== Tajikistan ===
- Tajik-Afghan Friendship Bridge

=== Turkey ===
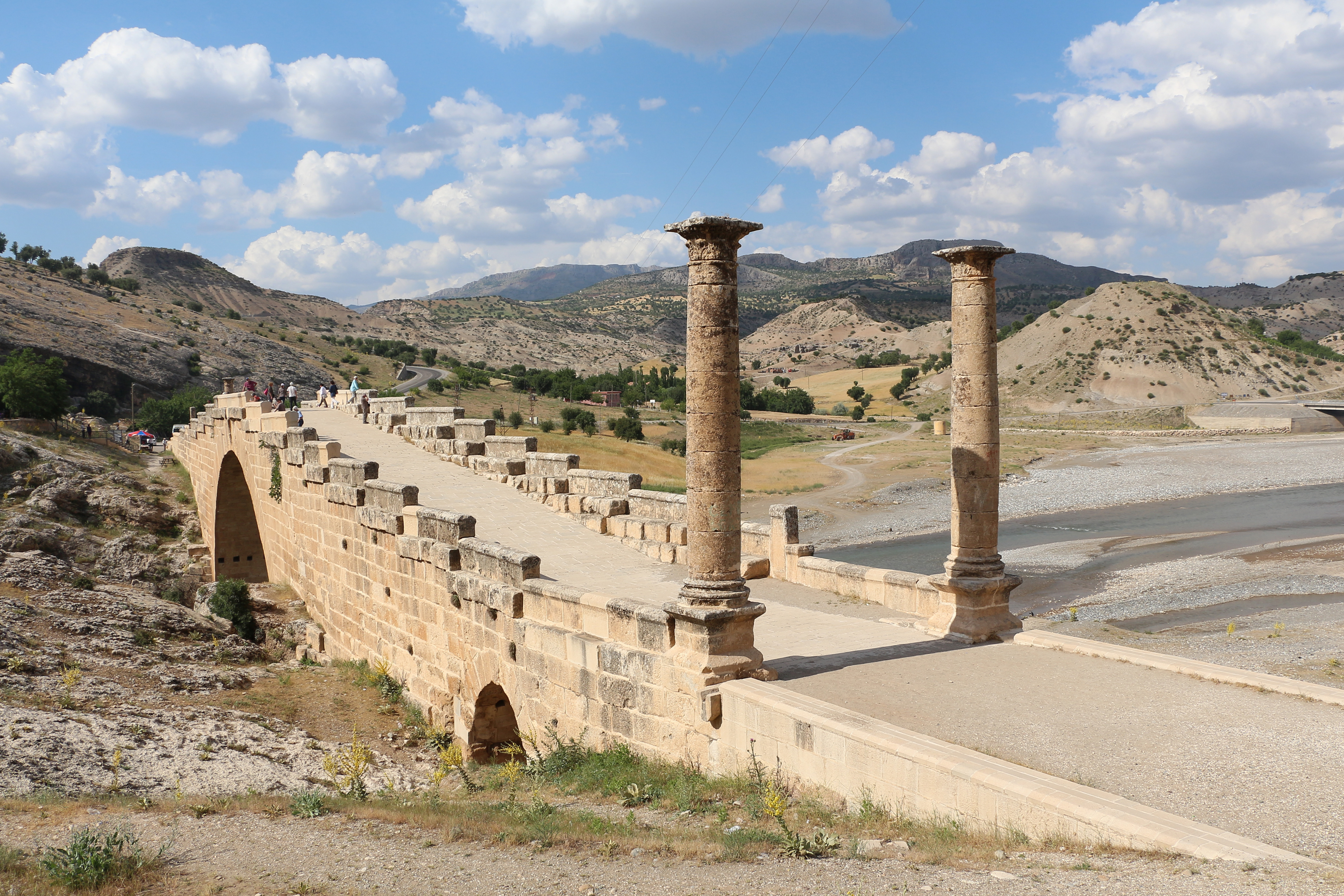
The Severan Bridge

- Aesepus Bridge
- Akköprü, Ankara Province
- Arapsu Bridge
- Bosphorus Bridge (Boğaziçi Köprüsü), Istanbul, connects Asia and Europe.
- Constantine's Bridge (Mysia)
- Çanakkale 1915 Bridge (1915 Çanakkale Köprüsü), Çanakkale, also known as Dardanelles Bridge.
- Demirköprü, Adana
- Eurymedon Bridge (Aspendos)
- Eurymedon Bridge (Selge)
- Fatih Sultan Mehmet Bridge (F.S.M. Köprüsü), Istanbul
- Galata Bridge (Galata Köprüsü), Istanbul
- Karamagara Bridge
- Kemer Bridge
- Limyra Bridge
- Macestos Bridge
- Malabadi Bridge (Malabadi Köprüsü), Diyarbakır
- Nysa Bridge
- Kömürhan Bridge, Eastern Anatolia
- Bridge at Oinoandai Antalya Province
- Penkalas Bridge
- Pergamon Bridge
- Sangarius Bridge
- Saraçhane Bridge, Edirne
- Severan Bridge (Cendere Köprüsü), Adıyaman
- Taşköprü, Adana
- Valens Aqueduct
- Varda Bridge (Varda Köprüsü), railway bridge in Adana Province
- White Bridge (Mysia)

=== Turkmenistan ===
- Atamurat-Kerkichi Bridge

=== Uzbekistan ===
- Afghanistan–Uzbekistan Friendship Bridge
- Amu Daria River Bridge

=== Vietnam ===
- Bãi Cháy Bridge in Hạ Long
- Bính Bridge in Hai Phong
- Cần Thơ Bridge in Cần Thơ and Vĩnh Long Province
- Cao Lãnh Bridge in Đồng Tháp
- Đò Quan Bridge in Nam Dinh City
- Dragon Bridge in Da Nang
- Hàn River Bridge in Da Nang
- Hiền Lương Bridge in Vĩnh Linh District, Quảng Trị Province
- Mỹ Thuận Bridge in Vĩnh Long and Tiền Giang Province
- Long Biên Bridge in Hanoi
- Nguyễn Văn Trỗi Bridge in Da Nang
- Nhật Tân Bridge in Hanoi
- Phú Mỹ Bridge in Ho Chi Minh City
- Rạch Miễu Bridge in Tiền Giang Province and Bến Tre Province
- Saigon Bridge in Ho Chi Minh City
- Thanh Hóa Bridge in Thanh Hóa
- Thanh Trì Bridge in Hanoi
- Thị Nại Bridge in Qui Nhơn
- Thủ Thiêm Bridge in Ho Chi Minh City
- Thuận Phước Bridge in Da Nang
- Trần Thị Lý Bridge in Da Nang
- Tuyên Sơn Bridge in Da Nang
- Vĩnh Tuy Bridge in Hanoi

== Europe ==
=== Belarus ===
- Kirov Bridge
- Sozh Floating Bridge

=== Denmark ===
- Farø Bridges, between Falster and Zealand
- Frederick IX Bridge spans the Guldborgsund strait between the islands of Falster and Lolland at Nykøbing Falster
- Great Belt Bridge, between Halsskov on Zealand and Knudshoved on Funen, second longest section span of 1.6 km.
- Guldborgsund Bridge spans the northern end of the Guldborgsund, between the islands of Lolland and Falster
- Masnedsund Bridge crosses Masnedsund between the islands Masnedø and Zealand, part of route to Falster
- New Little Belt Bridge, between Fredericia in Jutland and Middelfart on Funen
- Old Little Belt Bridge, between Fredericia in Jutland and Middelfart on Funen
- Øresund Bridge, Copenhagen, Denmark to Malmö, Sweden. Built 2000, connects Sweden with Denmark and Northern Europe with Europe
- Queen Alexandrine Bridge crosses Ulv Sund between the islands of Zeeland and Møn
- Sallingsund Bridge between the island Mors and the Salling peninsula on the mainland Jutland
- Storstrøm Bridge between Falster and Zealand via Masnedø
- Svendborgsund Bridge between the town of Svendborg on Fyn and Vindeby on the island of Tåsinge
- Vejle Fjord Bridge between Mølholm and Nørremarken near the town of Vejle
- Vilsund Bridge crosses Vildsund between Mors and Thy

=== Georgia ===
- Ananuri Bridge
- Baratashvili Bridge
- Besleti Bridge
- Bridge of Peace
- Dandalo bridge
- Red Bridge (border)
- Varjanauli Bridge

=== Germany ===
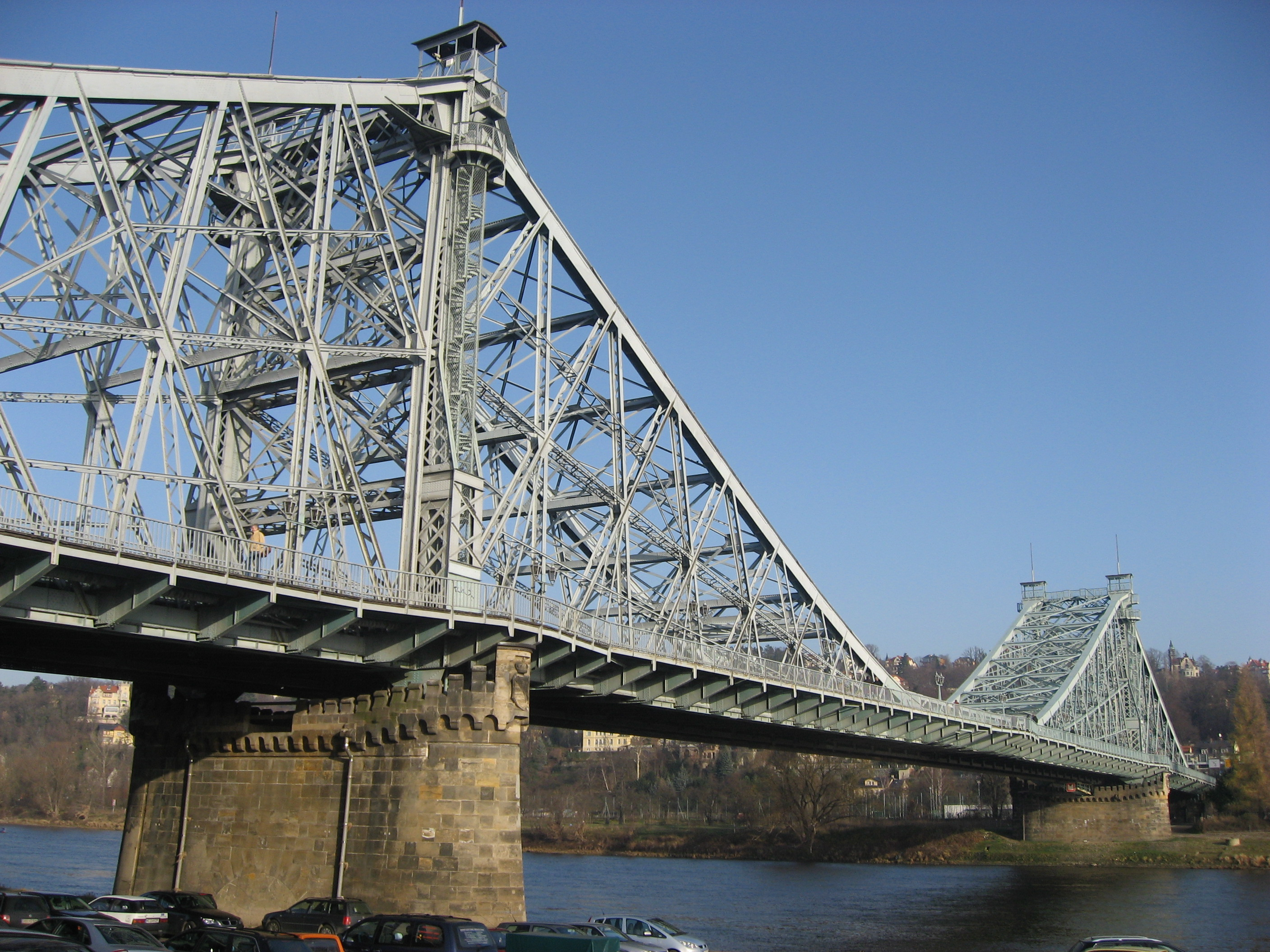
Blue Wonder, spanning the River Elbe

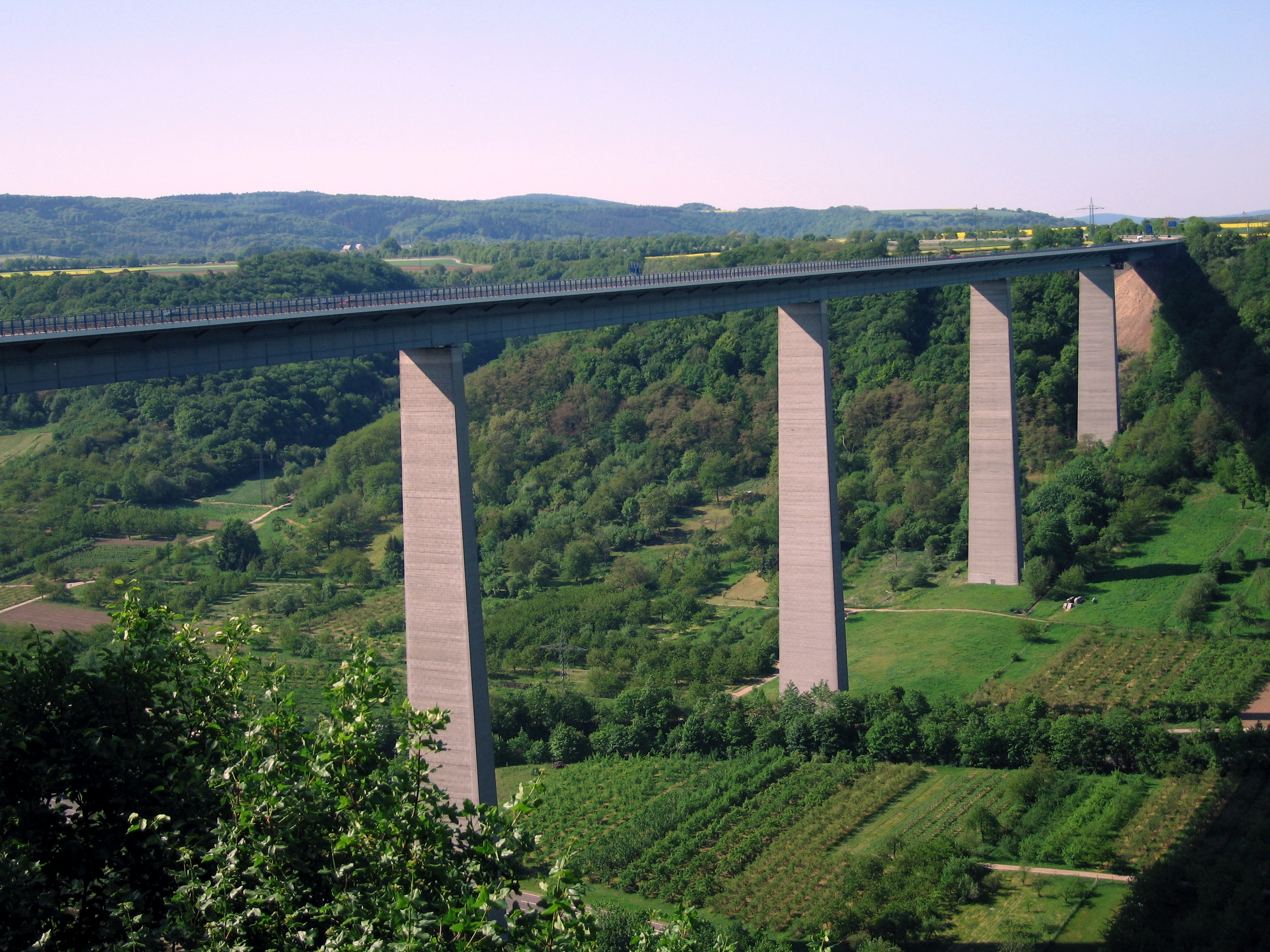
Moselle Viaduct, spanning the River Moselle

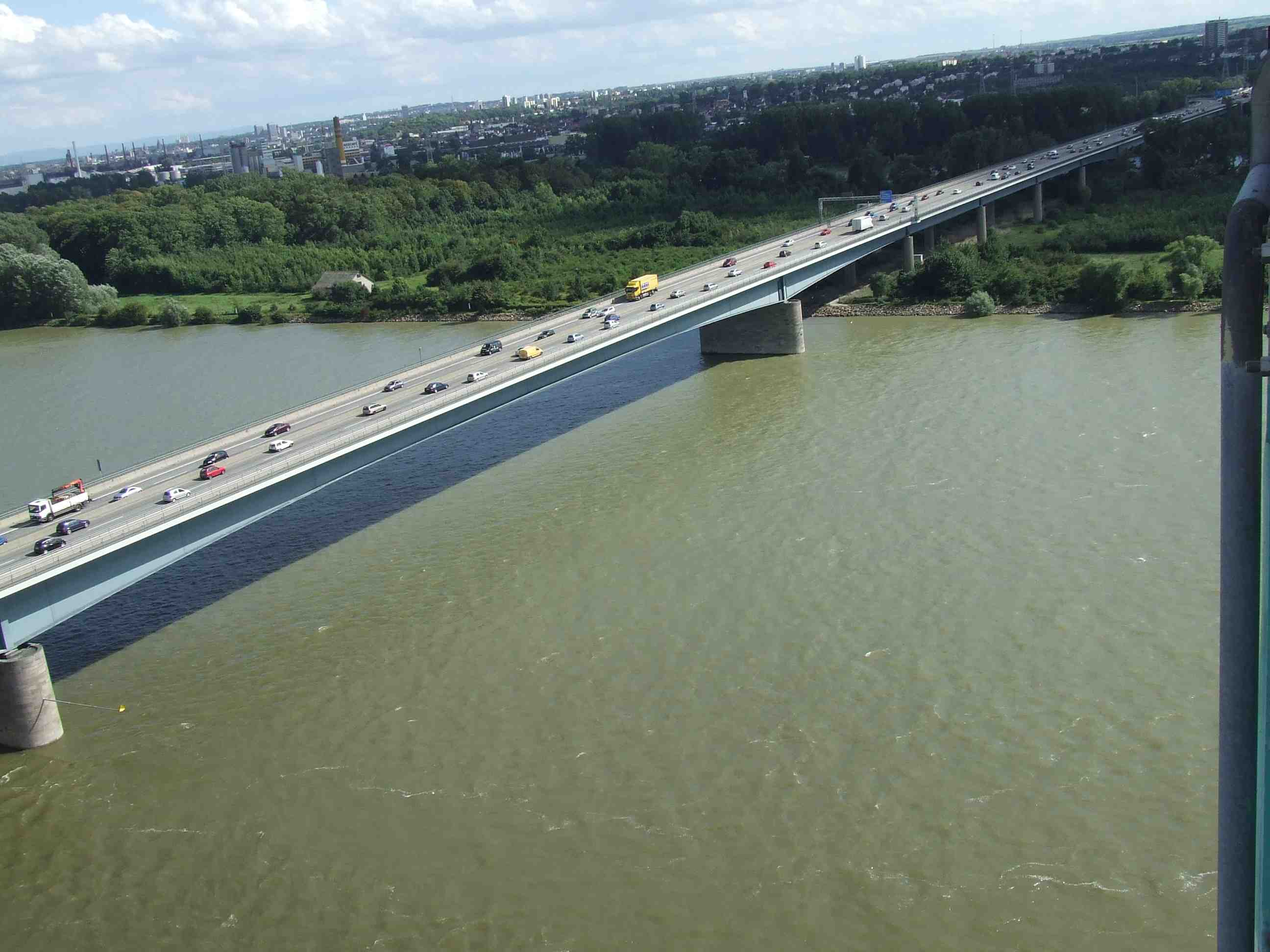
Schierstein Bridge, spanning the River Rhine

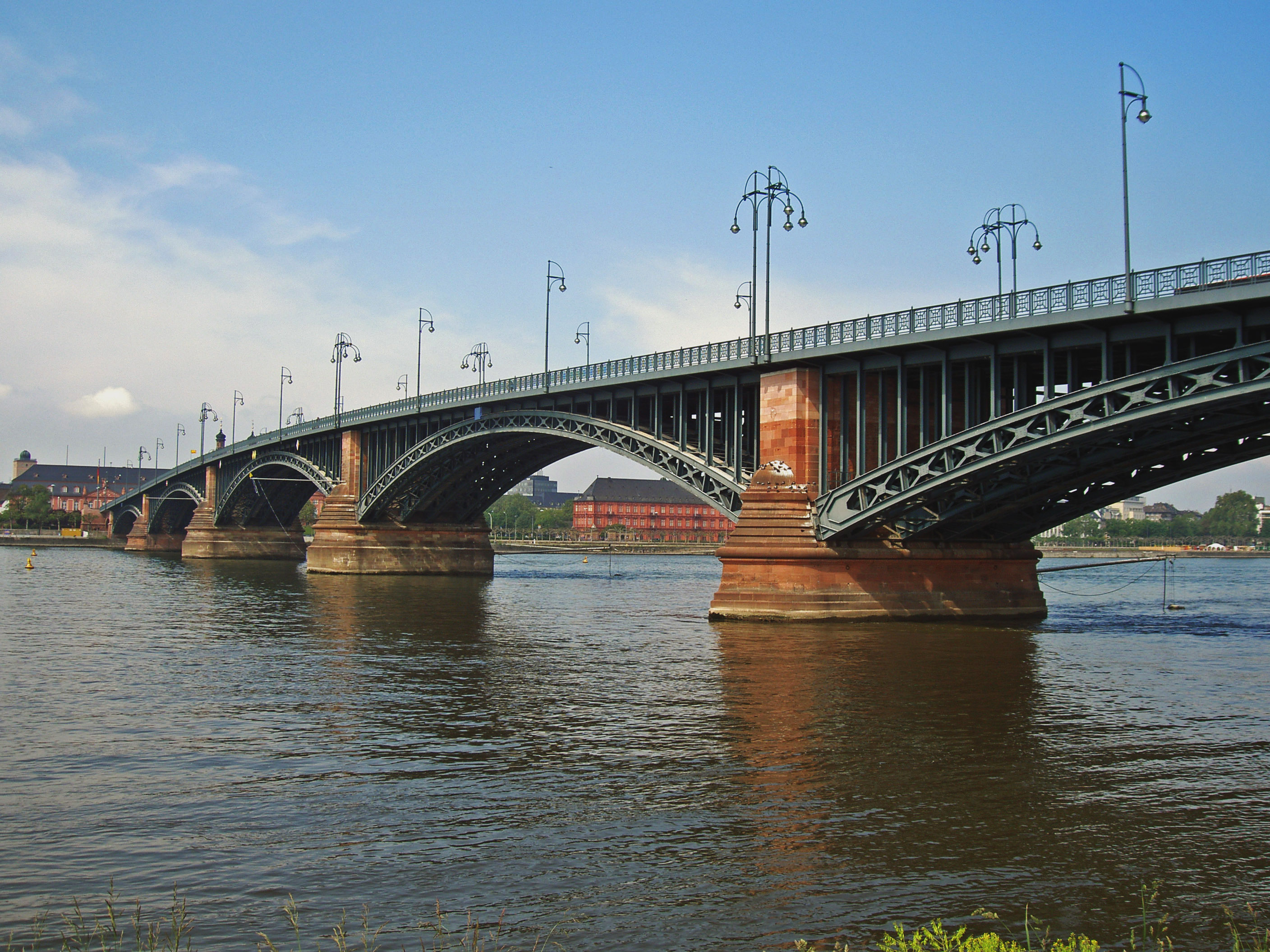
Theodor Heuss Bridge (Mainz-Wiesbaden), spanning the River Rhine

- Blue Wonder, or Loschwitz Bridge
- Charlotten Bridge
- Cologne Rodenkirchen Bridge
- Elster Viaduct (Pirk)
- Fehmarn Sound Bridge
- Flehe Bridge
- Göltzsch Viaduct
- Gedser-Rostock Bridge
- Hochmosel Bridge
- Holzbrücke Bad Säckingen
- Kaiser Wilhelm Bridge
- Kennedy Bridge (Bonn)
- Kocher Viaduct
- Köhlbrand Bridge
- Körsch Viaduct
- Lindaunis Bridge
- Ludendorff Bridge, the Bridge at Remagen, destroyed in the Second World War
- Mangfall Bridge
- Moselle Viaduct
- Mülheim Bridge, Cologne
- Neckar Viaduct, Weitingen
- Nibelungen Bridge (Regensburg)
- Oberbaum Bridge
- Osten Transporter Bridge
- Pfaffendorf Bridge
- Pierre Pflimlin Bridge
- Roman Bridge (Trier)
- Schierstein Bridge
- Stone Bridge (Regensburg)
- Strelasund Crossing
- Tauber Bridge, Rothenburg ob der Tauber
- Theodor Heuss Bridge (Düsseldorf)
- Theodor Heuss Bridge (Frankenthal)
- Theodor Heuss Bridge (Mainz-Wiesbaden)
- Waldschlösschen Bridge
- Weidendammer Bridge
- Weihe Viaduct
- Werra Viaduct, Hedemünden
- Wommen Viaduct

=== Iceland ===
- Borgarfjarðarbrú
- Hvítá bridge

=== Italy ===
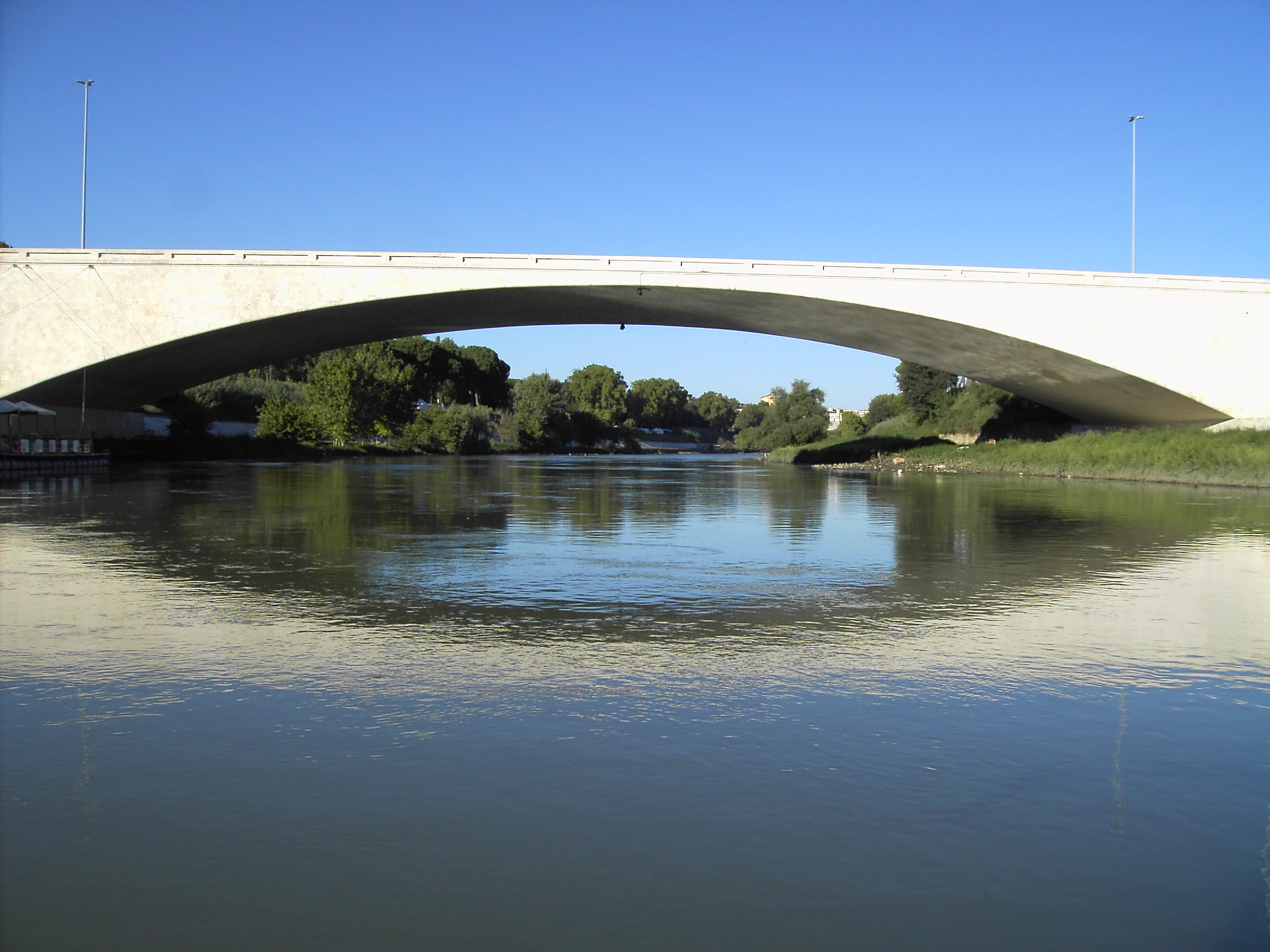
Ponte Duca d'Aosta

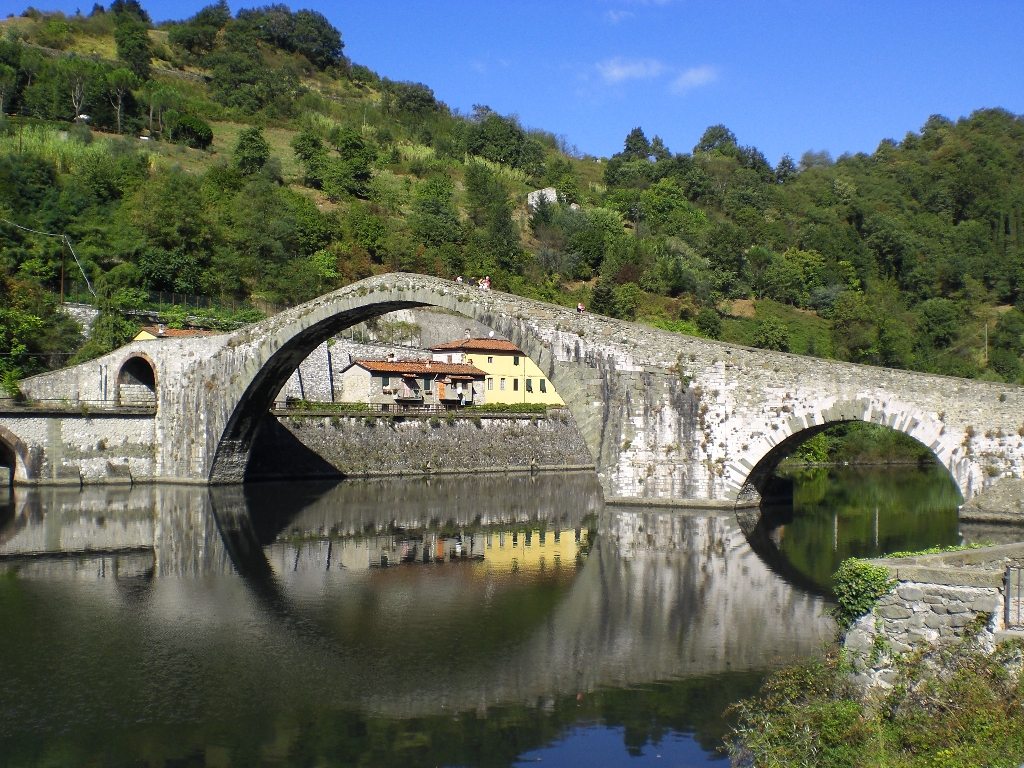
Ponte della Maddalena

- Ponte dell'Accademia
- Ponte Amerigo Vespucci
- Castelvecchio Bridge
- Ponte alle Grazie, Florence
- Ponte delle Guglie
- Ponte della Libertà
- Ponte della Maddalena
- Ponte Minich
- Ponte Morandi
- Rialto Bridge
- Ponte Santa Trinita, Florence
- Ponte degli Scalzi
- Bridge of Sighs
- Strait of Messina Bridge
- Bassano bridge
- Ponte Vecchio, Florence
- Ponte Vecchio, Cesena
- Ponte Punta Penna Pizzone, Taranto

=== Luxembourg ===
- Adolphe Bridge
- Grand Duchess Charlotte Bridge
- Passerelle
- Pulvermuhl Viaduct
- Victor Bodson Bridge

=== Malta ===
- Manwel Dimech Bridge in San Ġiljan
- Grand Harbour Breakwater Bridge in Valletta, Malta

=== Moldova ===
- Eiffel Bridge, Ungheni
- Lipcani–Rădăuți-Prut Bridge
- Stânca-Costești Dam

=== Netherlands ===
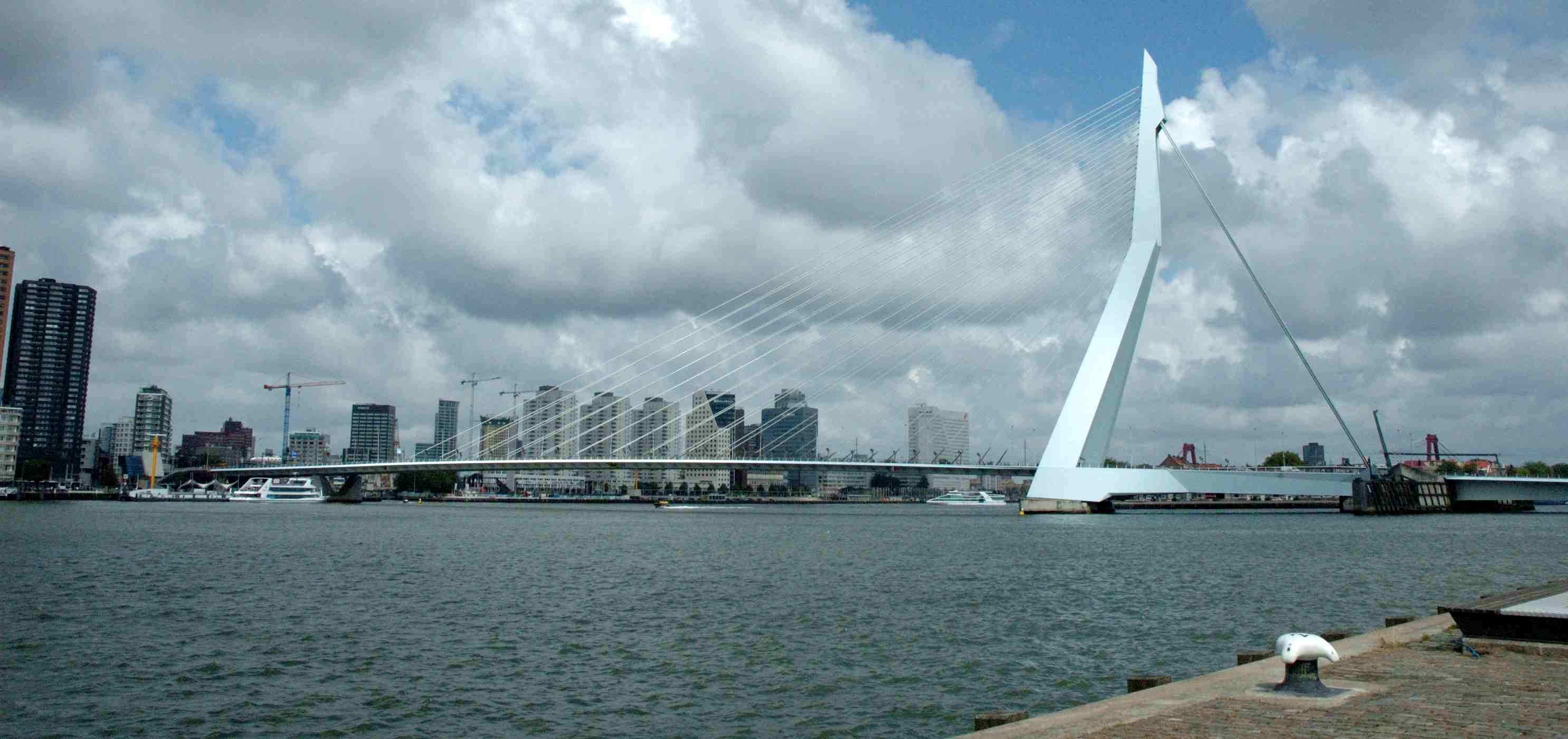
Erasmusbrug

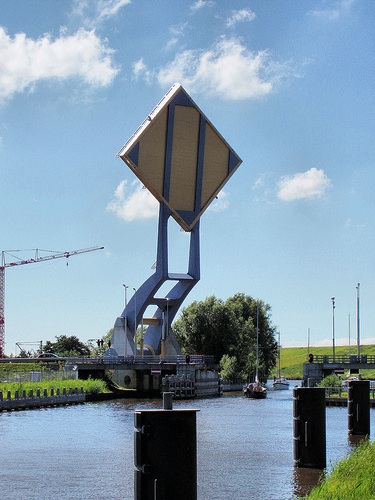
Slauerhoffbrug

- Admiraliteitsbrug, Rotterdam
- Blauwbrug, Amsterdam
- Boezembrug, Rotterdam
- Enneüs Heerma Bridge, Amsterdam
- Erasmusbrug, Rotterdam
- Hoge Brug, Maastricht
- Hollandse Brug, Gooimeer and IJmeer
- John Frost Bridge, Arnhem
- John S. Thompsonbrug, Grave
- Ketelbrug, Ketelmeer
- Magere Brug, Amsterdam
- Moerdijk bridges, Dordrecht
- Muntplein, Amsterdam
- Python Bridge, Amsterdam
- Sint Servaasbrug, Maastricht
- Slauerhoffbrug, Leeuwarden
- Van Brienenoordbrug, Rotterdam
- Vlaardingse Vaart Bridge, Vlaardingen
- Waalbrug, Nijmegen
- Willemsbrug, Rotterdam
- Zeeland Bridge, Schouwen-Duiveland and Noord-Beveland

=== North Macedonia ===
- Stone Bridge

=== Poland ===
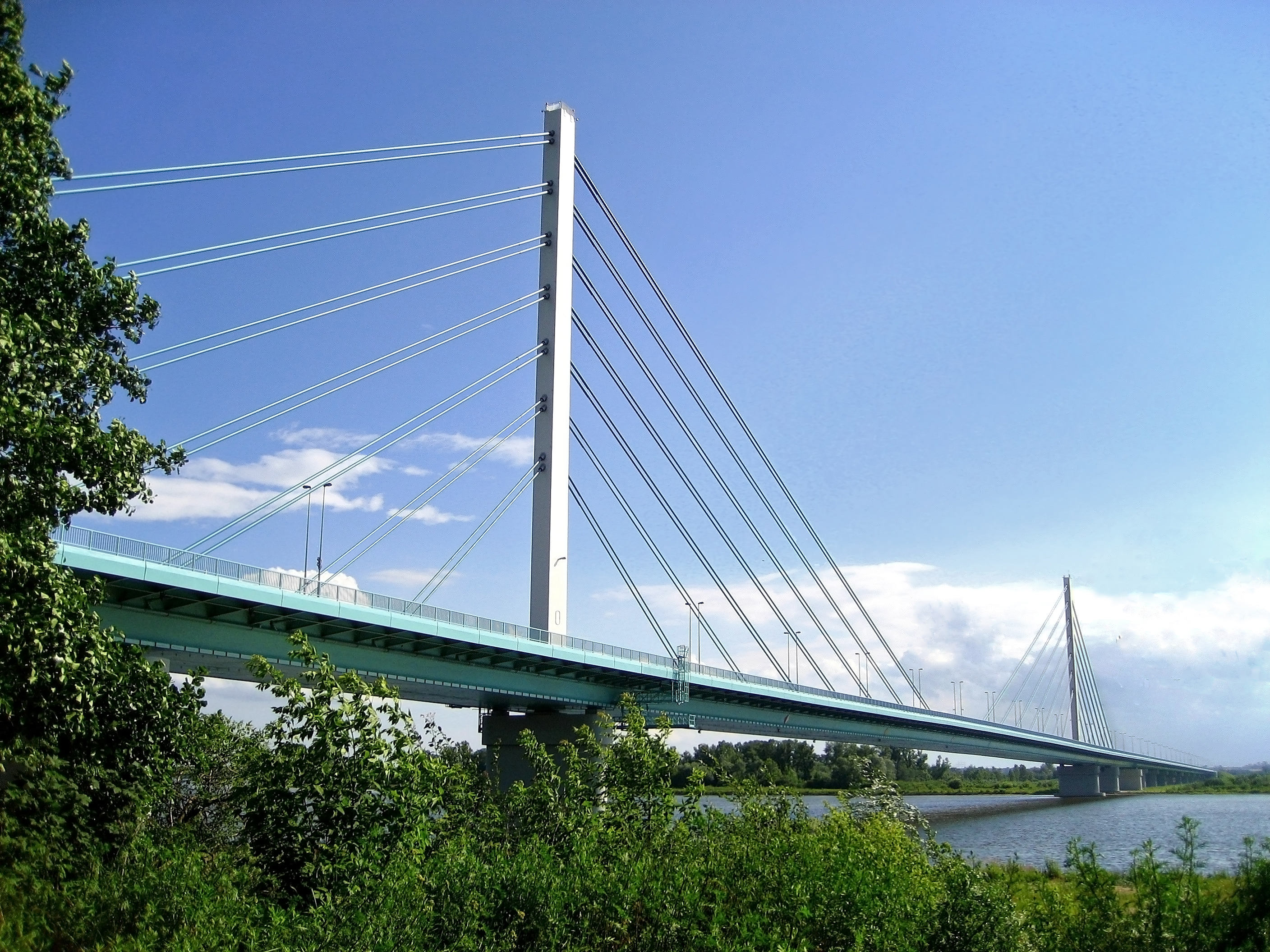
The Solidarity Bridge in Płock, Poland

- Solidarity Bridge

=== Portugal ===
- 25 de Abril Bridge
- Arrábida Bridge
- D. Luís Bridge
- Guadiana International Bridge
- D. Maria Pia Bridge
- Roman bridge (Chaves)
- Ponte de Rubiães
- Vasco da Gama Bridge, the longest bridge in Europe at 17.2 km

=== Russia ===
- Crimean Bridge
- Krasnoyarsk Bridge
- Khabarovsk Bridge
- Khanty-Mansiysk Bridge
- Ladozhsky Bridge
- Millennium Bridge
- Saratov Bridge
- Surgut Bridge
- President Bridge

=== Spain ===
- Montabliz Viaduct
- Alcántara Bridge
- Puente del Alamillo, Seville
- Vizcaya Bridge, the oldest transporter bridge in the world
- Rande Bridge
- Bridge of Henares, Guadalajara

=== Sweden ===
- Älvsborg Bridge, 933 m (418 m span)
- Höga Kusten Bridge, 1,867 m (1,210 m span)
- Igelsta Bridge, 2,140 m
- Lejonströmsbron, 207 m. The oldest wooden bridge in Sweden, from 1737.
- Lidingöbron, 997 m. There was a 750-metre-long (2,460 ft) bridge there already 1802.
- Öland bridge, 6,072 m
- Öresund Bridge, from Sweden to Denmark. 7,845 m (of which 5,300 m in Sweden. 490 m span)
- Tjörnbron Bridge, 664 m (366 m span)
- Uddevalla Bridge, 1,712 m (414 m span)

== North America ==
=== Bermuda ===
- Somerset Bridge, Bermuda

=== Canada ===
- Confederation Bridge
- Hartland Covered Bridge
- Quebec Bridge
- SkyBridge

=== Costa Rica ===
- Puente La Amistad de Taiwán
- Puente del Rio Virilla

=== Dominican Republic ===
- Puente Juan Bosch, In Santo Domingo
- Mauricio Báez Bridge, In San Pedro De Macoris

=== Mexico ===
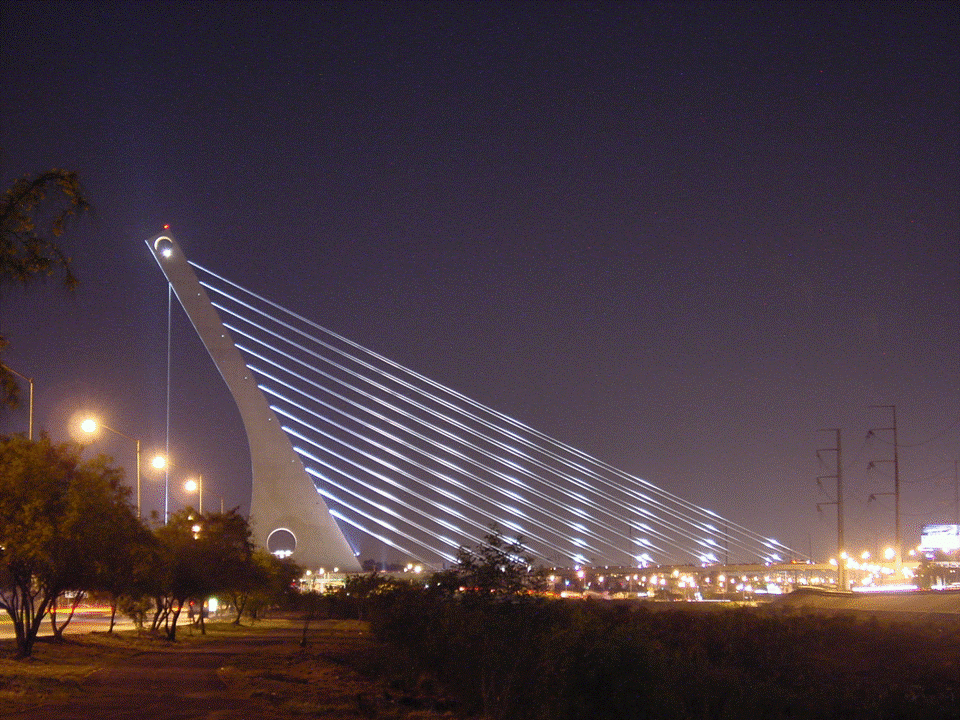
Puente de la Unidad

- Presumed Maya Bridge at Yaxchilan. If it was actually a bridge, it would be the longest one discovered in the ancient world.
- Baluarte Bridge
- Chiapas Bridge
- El Puente del Papa
- Mezcala Bridge
- Ojuela Bridge
- Puente de la Unidad
- Roma – Ciudad Miguel Alemán International Bridge
- Tampico Bridge
- Texas Mexican Railway International Bridge

=== Panama ===
- Bridge of the Americas
- Centennial Bridge
- Third Bridge over Panama Canal

=== Puerto Rico ===
- Cayey Bridge
- General Mendez Vigo Bridge
- Jesús Izcoa Moure Bridge (PR-5)
- Puente de Trujillo Alto
- Teodoro Moscoso Bridge (PR-17)
- Puente Río Portugués
- Puente de los Leones
- Puente La Milagrosa

=== United States ===
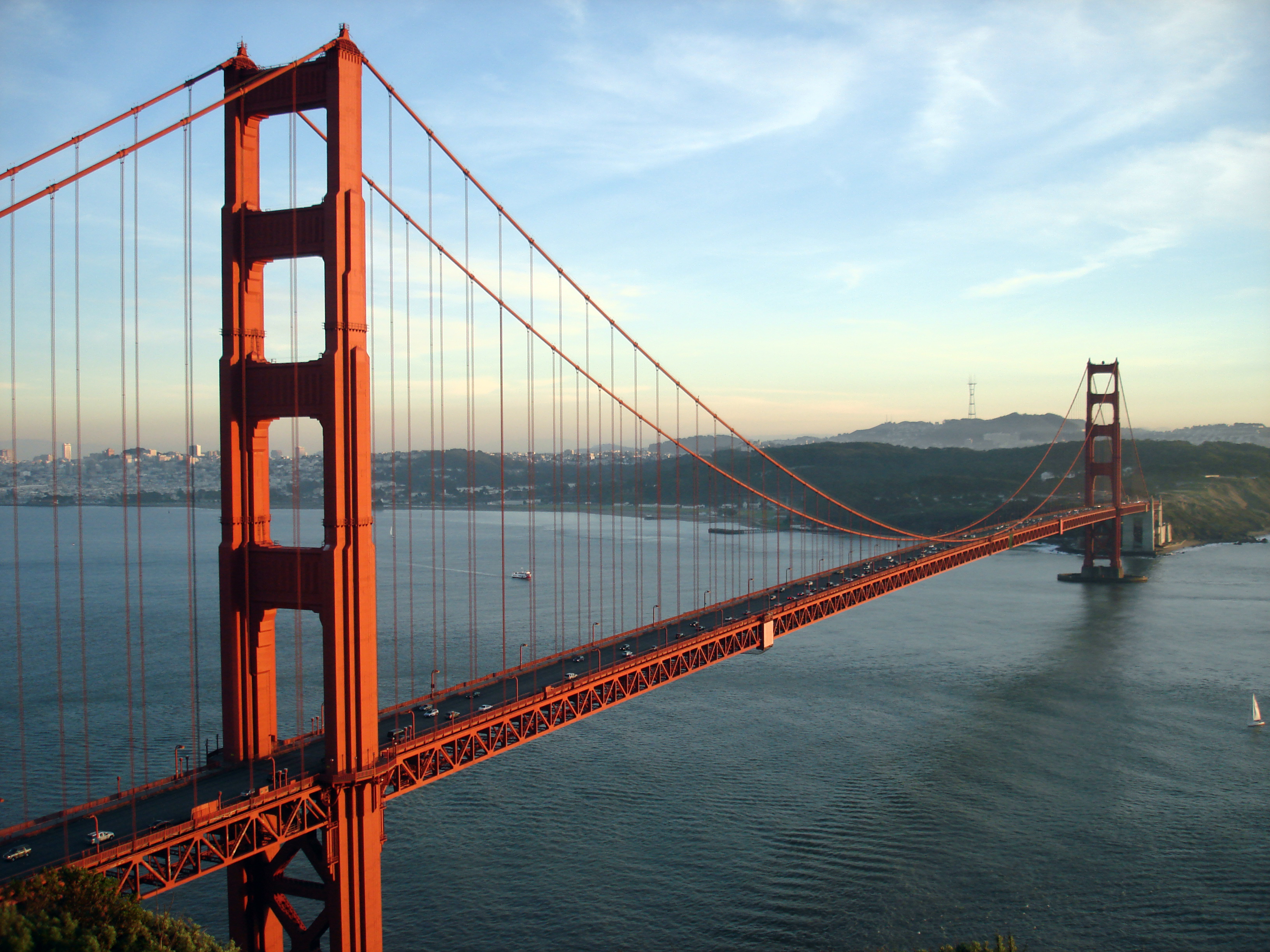
The Golden Gate Bridge spans the Golden Gate.

Just a few of the most famous bridges in the U.S. are:

- Brooklyn Bridge
- George Washington Bridge
- Golden Gate Bridge
- Manhattan Bridge
- San Francisco–Oakland Bay Bridge
- Tacoma Narrows Bridge
- Seven Mile Bridge

== South America ==
=== Argentina ===
- General Artigas Bridge
- General Belgrano Bridge
- Ingeniero Ballester Dam
- Integration Bridge
- Libertador General San Martín Bridge
- Neuquén-Cipolletti bridges
- Paso de los Libres – Uruguaiana International Bridge
- Puente de la Mujer
- Puente Transbordador
- Puente Valentín Alsina
- Rosario-Victoria Bridge
- Salto Grande Bridge
- San Roque González de Santa Cruz Bridge
- Tancredo Neves Bridge
- Zárate–Brazo Largo Bridge

=== Brazil ===
- Fraternity Bridge (connects with Argentina)
- Friendship Bridge (Paraguay-Brazil) (connects with Paraguay)
- Hercilio Luz Bridge
- Juscelino Kubitschek bridge
- Paso de los Libres-Uruguaiana International Bridge (connects with Argentina)
- Rio-Niterói Bridge
- Journalist Roberto Marinho bridge (in São Paulo)
- Newton Navarro Bridge (Natal)

=== Chile ===
- Calle-Calle Bridge
- Juan Pablo II Bridge
- Malleco Viaduct
- Pedro de Valdivia Bridge
- Río Cruces Bridge

=== Colombia ===
- César Gaviria Trujillo Viaduct
- Envigado bridge
- Puente de Boyacá
- Puente de Occidente
- Pumarejo bridge
- Rumichaca Bridge

=== Paraguay ===
- Friendship Bridge
- San Roque González de Santa Cruz Bridge

=== Peru ===
- Inca Bridge
- Puente de Piedra

=== Suriname ===
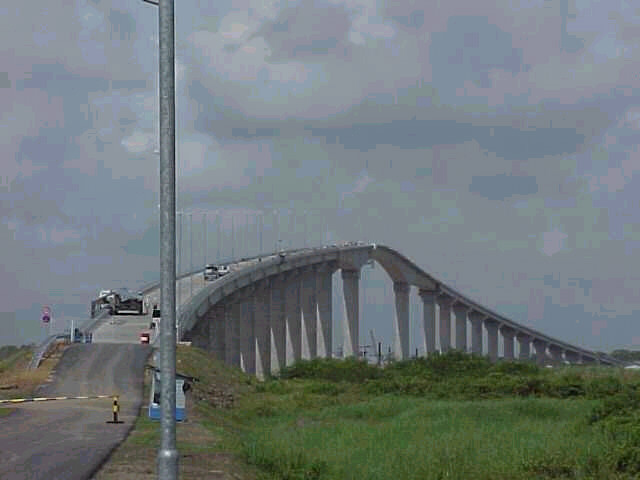
Jules Wijdenbosch Brug, spanning The Suriname River, connecting Paramaribo with Meerzorg

- Jules Wijdenbosch Bridge, Span of 1,504 metres (4,934 ft)
- Coppename Bridge

=== Venezuela ===
- Angostura Bridge
- General Rafael Urdaneta Bridge
- Orinoquia Bridge

== Oceania ==
=== Australia ===
- Albert Bridge, Brisbane
- Albion Viaduct, Melbourne
- Alexandra Bridge, Rockhampton
- Alfords Point Bridge, Sydney
- Algebuckina Bridge, near Oodnadatta, South Australia
- Andrew Nixon Bridge, St George
- Anzac Bridge, Sydney
- Batman Bridge, Launceston
- Birkenhead Bridge, Port Adelaide
- Bolte Bridge, Melbourne
- Bowen Bridge, Hobart
- Bridgewater Bridge, Hobart
- Burdekin Bridge, near Ayr and Home Hill
- Captain Cook Bridge, Brisbane
- Captain Cook Bridge, Sydney
- Centenary Bridge, Brisbane
- Desmond Trannore Bridge, Gordonvale
- Eleanor Schonell Bridge, Brisbane
- Endeavour Bridge, Sydney
- Fig Tree Bridge, Sydney
- Fitzgerald Bridge, Aberdeen
- Fitzgerald Bridge, Raymond Terrace
- Fitzroy Bridge, Rockhampton
- Gateway Bridge, Brisbane
- Gladesville Bridge, Sydney
- Go Between Bridge, Brisbane
- Goodwill Bridge, Brisbane
- Grafton Bridge, New South Wales
- Hampden Bridge, Kangaroo Valley
- Hexham Bridge, Newcastle
- Hobart Bridge, Hobart
- Houghton Highway, Brisbane
- Iron Cove Bridge, Sydney
- Jack Pesch Bridge, Brisbane
- Jervois Bridge, Port Adelaide
- Jubilee Bridge, Innisfail
- Kurilpa Bridge, Brisbane
- Mary MacKillop Bridge, Port Adelaide
- Mcgees Bridge, Hobart
- Merivale Bridge, Brisbane
- Mooney Mooney Bridge, Central Coast
- Narrows Bridge, Perth
- Neville Hewitt Bridge, Rockhampton
- Nowra Bridge, Nowra
- Pyrmont Bridge, Sydney
- Richmond Bridge, Tasmania
- Ross Bridge, Tasmania
- Roseville Bridge, Sydney
- Sea Cliff Bridge, Coalcliff
- Spit Bridge, Sydney
- Stockton Bridge, Newcastle
- Story Bridge, Brisbane
- Sydney Harbour Bridge, Sydney
- Swanport Bridge, near Murray Bridge
- Tasman Bridge, Hobart
- Ted Smout Memorial Bridge, Brisbane
- The Entrance Bridge, The Entrance
- Tom 'Diver' Derrick Bridge, Port Adelaide
- Tom Uglys Bridge, Sydney
- Tourle Street Bridge, Newcastle
- Victoria Bridge, Brisbane
- Victoria Bridge, Devonport
- Victoria Bridge, Launceston
- Walter Taylor Bridge, Brisbane
- West Gate Bridge, Melbourne
- William Jolly Bridge, Brisbane

=== New Zealand ===
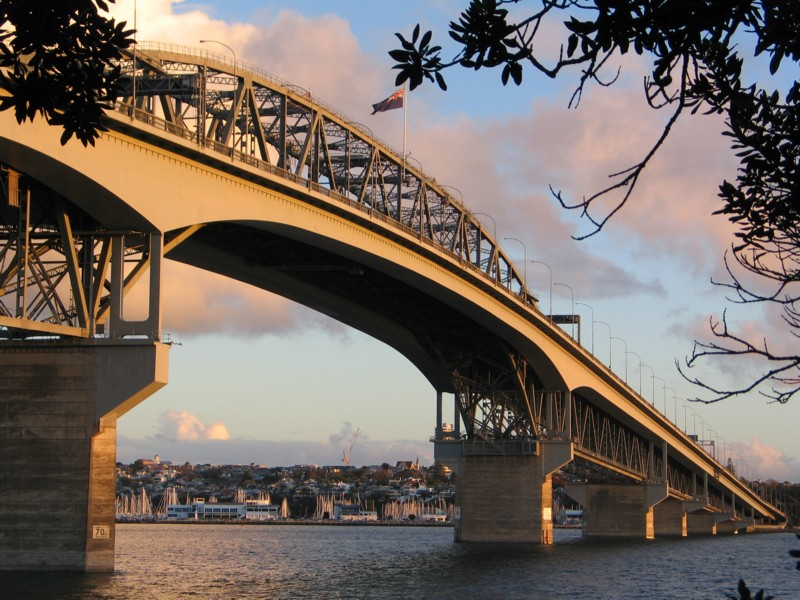
Auckland Harbour Bridge

- Auckland Harbour Bridge
- Bertrand Road suspension bridge
- Bridge to Nowhere
- Grafton Bridge
- Kopu Bridge
- Mangere Bridge
- Mohaka Viaduct
- Newmarket Viaduct
- Otira Viaduct
- Percy Burn Viaduct
- Rakaia Bridges (road and rail)
- Tauranga Harbour Bridge
- Te Rata Bridge
- Upper Harbour Bridge
- Victoria Park Viaduct

== Lists of bridges by type ==
- List of bridge types
- Lists of covered bridges
- List of road–rail bridges

== Lists of bridges by measurement ==
- List of highest bridges
- List of longest bridges
- List of tallest bridges
