= Zohar (disambiguation) =

The Zohar is a foundational work of the Kabbalah.

Zohar may also refer to:

- Zohar (name), including a list of persons with the name
- Zohar (band), a British musical band
- Zohar (album), an album by jazz musician John Zorn
- Zohar, Israel, a village in southern Israel
- Zohar (comics), a fictional character in Marvel comics

== See also ==
- Upper Zohar, a Byzantine fortlet in Israel
- Zohar Bridge, a road bridge in Israel
- Zuhr prayer, one of the five daily prayers in Islam, just after noon time
