= Weihe Viaduct =

Bridge of the A4 motorway near Richelsdorf, Germany

Coordinates: 50°57′36″N 10°02′41″E

The Weihe Viaduct (German: Weihetalbrücke, also known as Talbrücke Richelsdorf) is a motorway bridge on the Bundesautobahn 4 (A 4) near Richelsdorf, Germany. The bridge is located between the eastbound and westbound exits for Gerstungen on the route between Bad Hersfeld (Hesse) and Eisenach (Thuringia).

It is a prestressed concrete bridge with a length of 584 m, and rests on eight columns. It crosses the valley of the small river Weihe.

== History ==
The construction of the bridge had been planned since the beginning of the 1940s. Construction began but halted, leaving only a few columns built. This was due to its location near the former border between the German Democratic Republic and the Federal Republic of Germany. Instead, a provisional route through the valley was constructed for the motorway.

After the 1990 German reunification, traffic increased considerably, and in 1992 construction of a new bridge was started. The new bridge cost 45 million DM and was inaugurated in 1994. It was opened to traffic in 1995. Two of the old columns were kept as a monument.
