= Tarsan Bridge =

Bridge in Myanmar

Coordinates: 20°25′43.8″N 98°39′14.6″E

Tarsan Bridge is a bridge in Shan State, Burma. It crosses the Salween River. The Tarsan Hydroelectric Power Plant is reportedly being built in the area by a Thai firm which could potentially generate 7,100 megawatts of power.
