= Seri Bakti Bridge =

Bridge in Putrajaya, Malaysia

Seri Bakti Bridge Jambatan Seri Bakti
- Coordinates: 2°55′58″N 101°41′45″E
- Carries: Motor vehicles, Pedestrians
- Crosses: Putrajaya Lake
- Locale: Lebuh Perdana Selatan
- Official name: Seri Bakti Bridge
- Maintained by: Perbadanan Putrajaya

Characteristics
- Design: box girder bridge
- Total length: 270 m
- Width: --
- Longest span: --

History
- Designer: Perbadanan Putrajaya
- Constructed by: Perbadanan Putrajaya
- Opened: 1999

The Seri Bakti Bridge (Malay: Jambatan Seri Bakti) is one of the main bridges in Putrajaya, Malaysia. The bridge links the secondary road to Seri Satria, the Deputy Prime Minister's Residence, connecting the Government Precinct in the north to Precinct 16 in the south.

The concept design was developed from several shorter span, with a precast pretension "Super-T" beam slab deck with spans up to 35 m (115 ft). The total structure length is 270 m (890 ft). There are dual two lane carriageways, 2 m (6.6 ft) median, walkway and cycle track.

== See also ==
- Transport in Malaysia
