= Amu Darya Pipeline Bridge =

Amu Darya Pipeline Bridge Трубопроводный висячий мост через Амударью
- Coordinates: 41.0631°N 61.8992°E
- Carries: One lane of traffic and two pipelines.
- Crosses: River Amu Darya
- Locale: Xorazm Region, Uzbekistan and Lebap Region, Turkmenistan

Characteristics
- Design: Suspension bridge
- Longest span: 390 metres (1,280 ft)

History
- Opened: 1964

The Amu Darya Pipeline Bridge is a suspension bridge on the Amu Darya river. It is primarily a pipeline bridge but can also carry one lane of traffic. The bridge connects the Xorazm Region of Uzbekistan to the Lebap Region of Turkmenistan. Completed in 1964, it has a main span of 390 metres (1,280 ft).
