= Zohar (comics) =

Zohar is a fictional character appearing in American comic books published by Marvel Comics. The character first appeared in Moon Knight #37 (May 1984).

== Fictional character biography ==
Reuben Davis was a rabbi who gained mystical powers by studying Kabbalah and fought Moon Knight.
