= Đò Quan Bridge =

Bridge in Vietnam

Coordinates: 20.4208°N 106.1800°E

Đò Quan Bridge goes across Đào River, a branch of the Red River in Nam Định, Vietnam, an antique city 90 km (56 mi) South to Hanoi. The bridge was in inauguration in 1994 and serves to connect the city with the 6 other districts. 436.55 m (1,432.3 ft) long and 15 m (49 ft) wide, Đò Quan used to be the largest bridge in Nam Định province before the appearance of Tân Đệ Bridge. This bridge is regarded as a cultural part of Nam Định.
