= Boezembrug =

Bridge in Rotterdam, Netherlands

Coordinates: 51.9287°N 4.4974°E

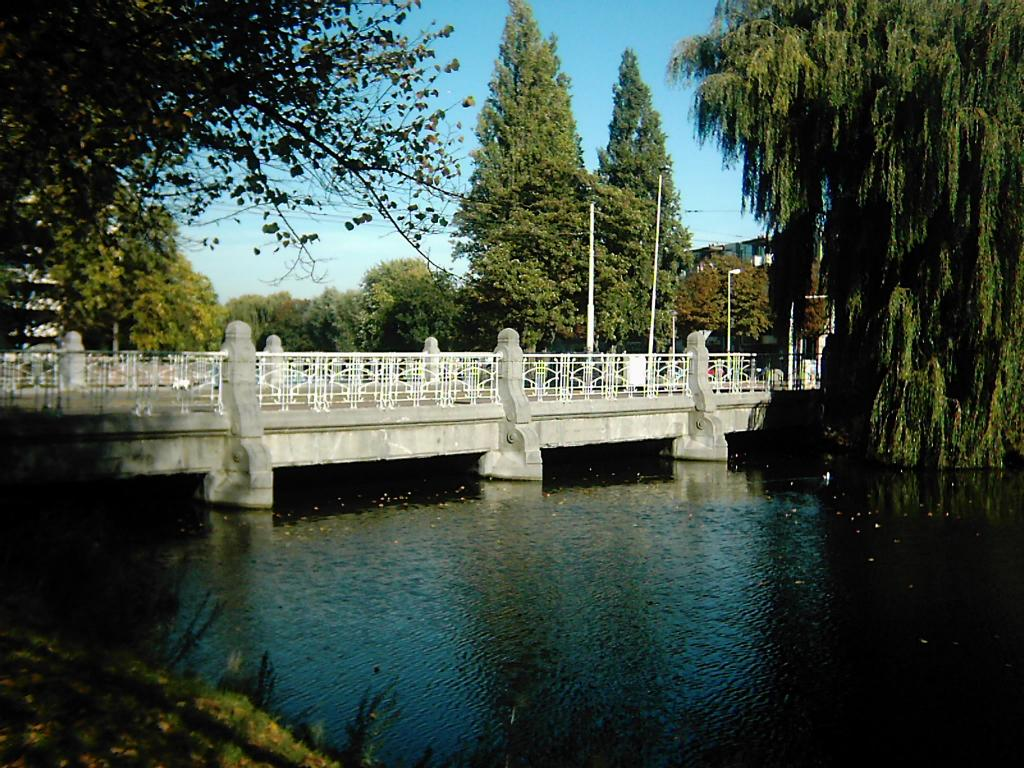
Boezembrug

The Boezembrug is a bridge in Rotterdam, part of the Goudse Rijweg (Gouda roadway). The bridge connects both banks of the river Boezem. The bridge is a Rijksmonument designed by S. J. Rutgers in 1903.
