= Seri Bestari Bridge =

Bridge in Putrajaya, Malaysia

Seri Bestari Bridge Jambatan Seri Bestari
- Coordinates: 2°55′31″N 101°41′46″E
- Carries: Motor vehicles, Pedestrians
- Crosses: Putrajaya Lake
- Locale: Lebuh Bestari
- Official name: Seri Bestari Bridge
- Maintained by: Perbadanan Putrajaya

Characteristics
- Design: box girder bridge
- Total length: 152.6 m
- Width: --
- Longest span: 60 m

History
- Designer: Perbadanan Putrajaya
- Constructed by: Perbadanan Putrajaya
- Opened: 1999

The Seri Bestari Bridge (Malay: Jambatan Seri Bestari) is a large arch bridge in Putrajaya, Malaysia. The eastern end of the bridge starts in Precinct 16 and the western end starts near Wisma Putra on Core Island.

The bridge has a total length of 152.6 meters with a main span of 60 meters.

A key feature of the bridge is its visible, tapered arch beneath the structure, while the deck discreetly houses 400mm water pipes, electrical, and communication cables. The total length is 152.6 meters, including a 60m main span, two 35m side spans, and 11.3m approaches. It includes two carriageways, a 3m median, walkways, and cycling paths.

== See also ==
- Transport in Malaysia
