= Yeongdong Bridge =

Bridge in Seoul, South Korea

Coordinates: 37°31′47.80″N 127°3′25.40″E

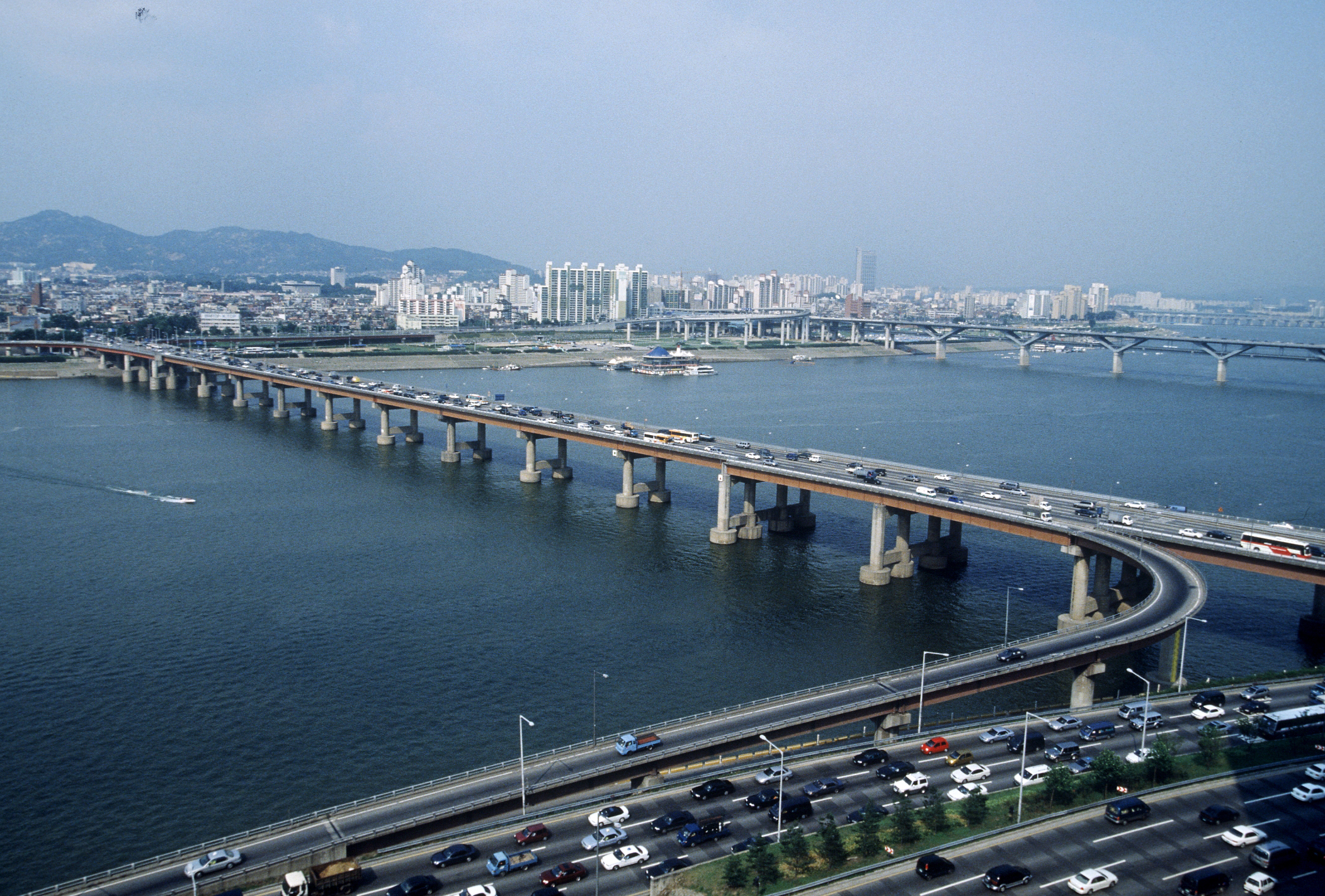

Korean name
- Hangul: 영동대교
- Hanja: 永東大橋
- RR: Yeongdong daegyo
- MR: Yŏngdong taegyo

Yeongdong Bridge (Korean: 영동대교) is a bridge over the Han River in Seoul, South Korea. The bridge links the Gwangjin and Seongdong districts north of the river to the Gangnam district. It was opened on November 8, 1973.
