= Pulvermuhl Viaduct =

Coordinates: 49.6078°N 6.1392°E

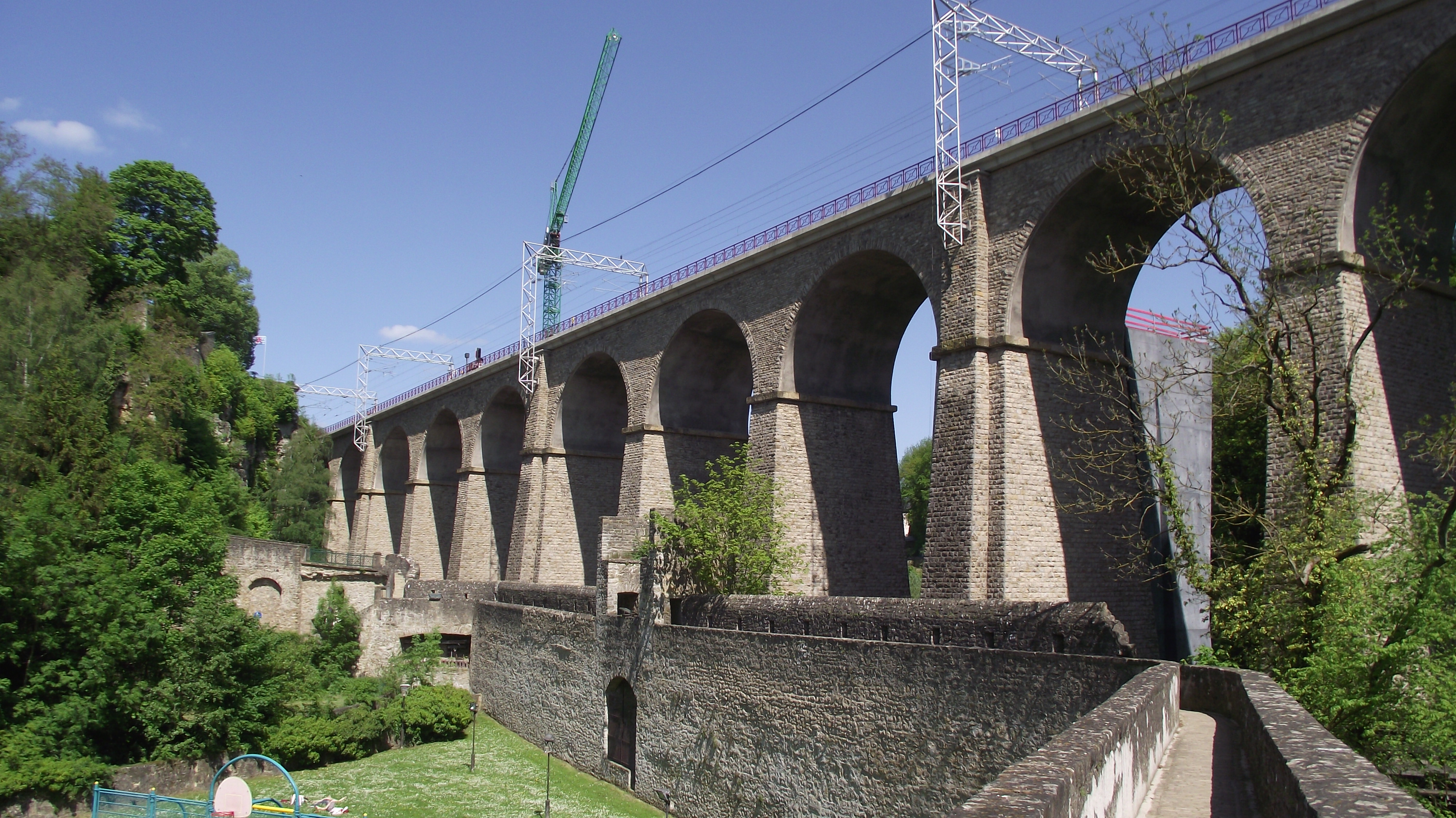
View of the viaduct

The Pulvermuhl Viaduct (Biisser Bréck in Luxembourgish) is a two-track railway viaduct in Pulvermuhl in eastern Luxembourg City, in southern Luxembourg.

== Technical details ==
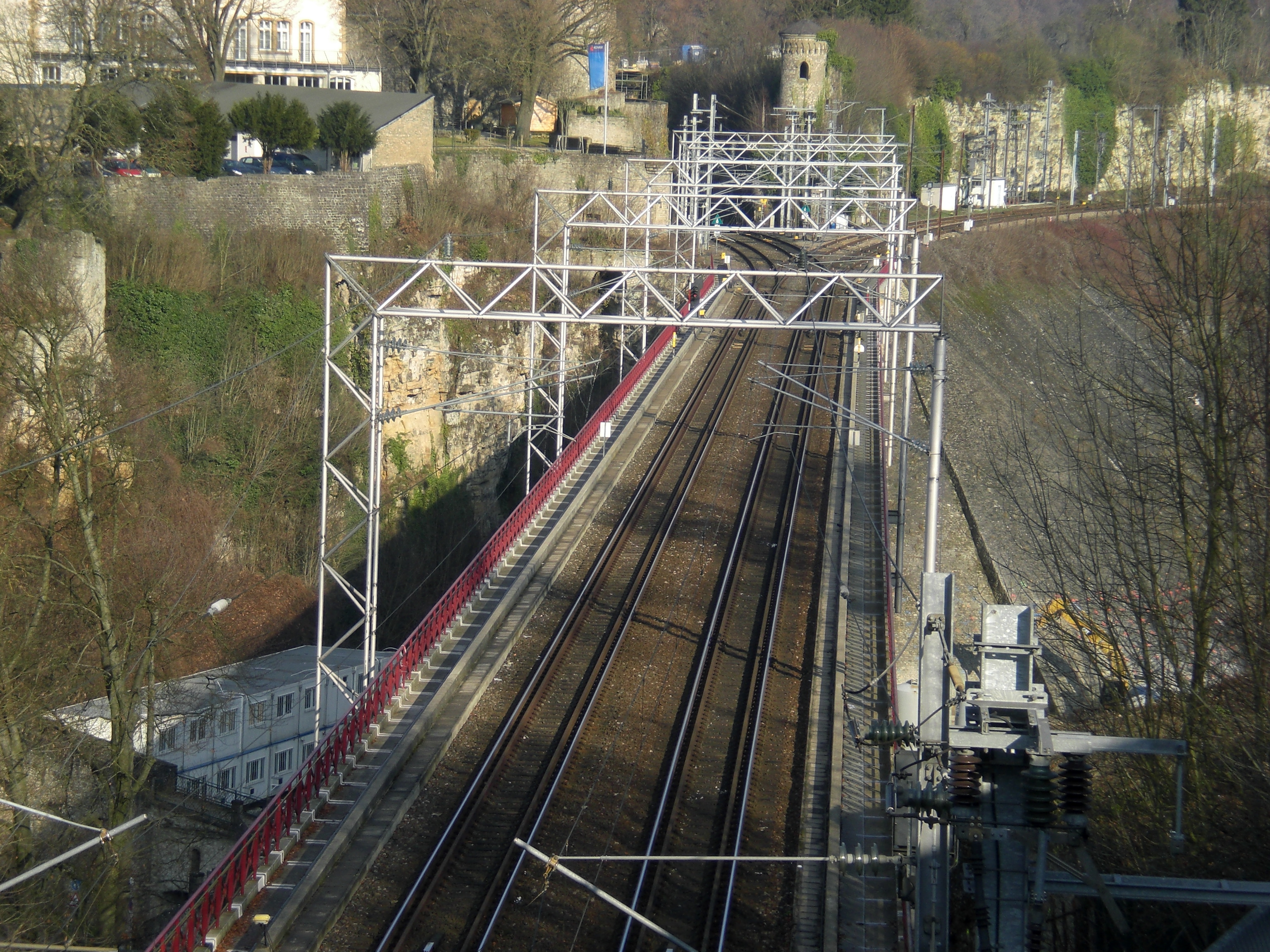
The deck of the viaduct

The viaduct crosses the Alzette valley between the north exit of the Luxembourg station and the Rham Plateau. The viaduct has two abutments and four intermediate supports of hollow reinforced concrete, supported by deep foundations of hollow reinforced concrete with a bridge deck formed of a composite structure made of a metal frame and a triangular tubular reinforced concrete slab.

The structure has a length of 242 meters and is up to 37 meters high. It was opened along with the railway track in 1862 and has been electrified since 1988. This structure (as well as the other two viaducts in the city of Luxembourg) are based on plans of Waring Brothers Company.

== Expansion plans ==
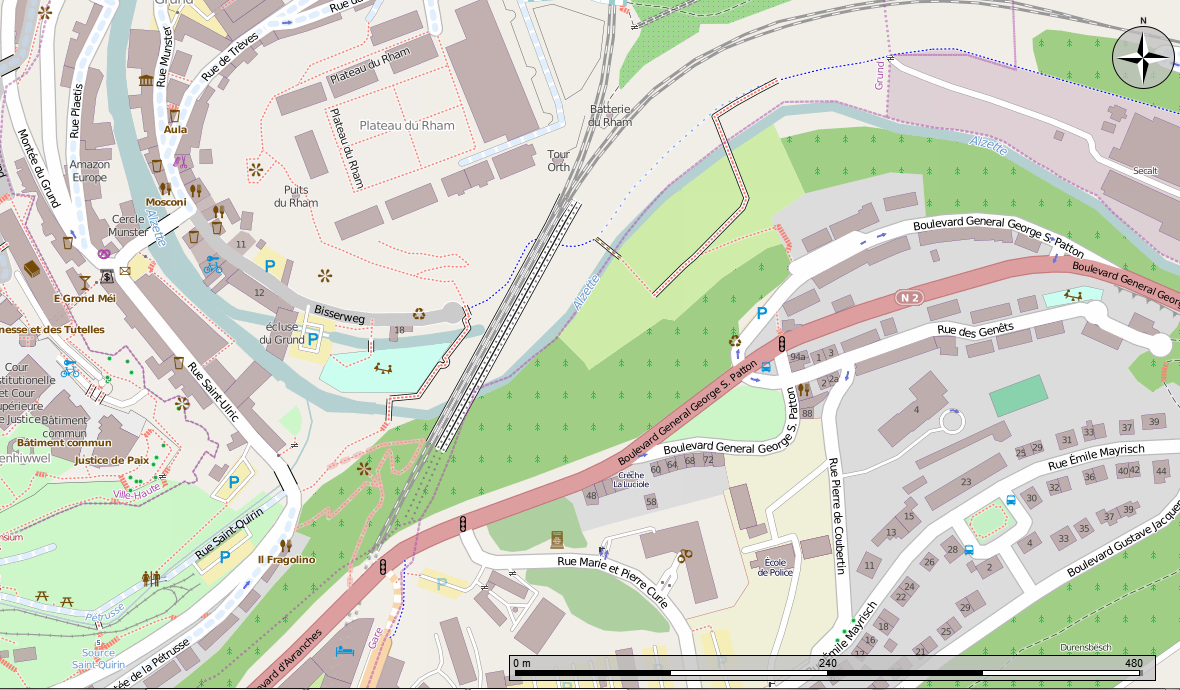
Map showing the original viaduct, with the expansion beside it

The two-track viaduct is a strangle-point for the exit from the north exit of the Luxembourg station and plans are to increase the number of tracks over the viaduct to four, with work starting in 2009 and to be completed by 2015.

During the preparations for the construction site, remains were unearthed dating back partly to the Middle Ages. Two archeological digs were launched on the outskirts of the district of Grund. In geological strata dating the 17th century, archaeologists discovered 13 tombs and twenty bodies.
