= Theodor Heuss Bridge (Mainz-Wiesbaden) =

Coordinates: 50°0′24″N 8°16′37″E

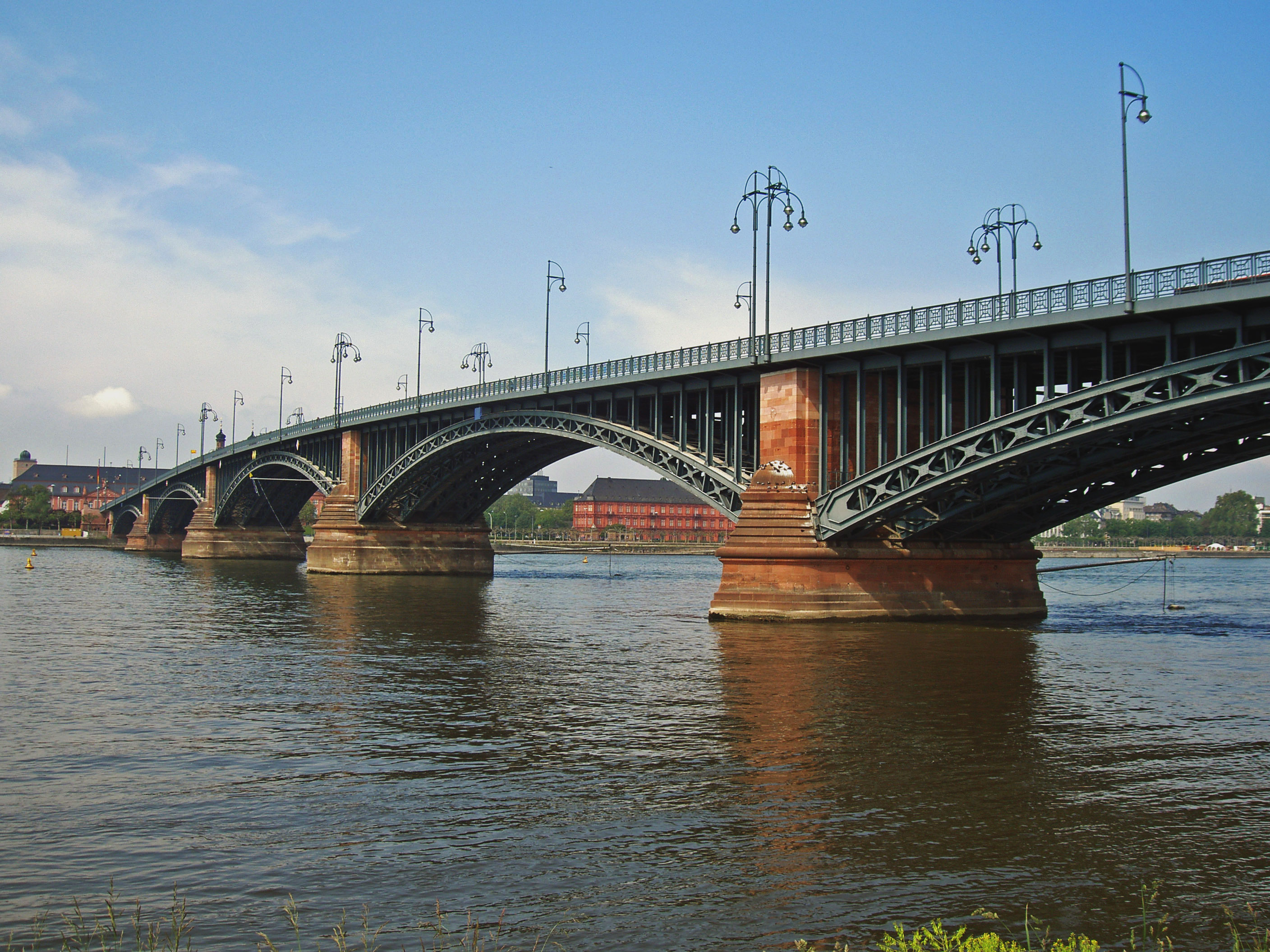
Theodor Heuss Bridge as seen from Kastel towards Mainz

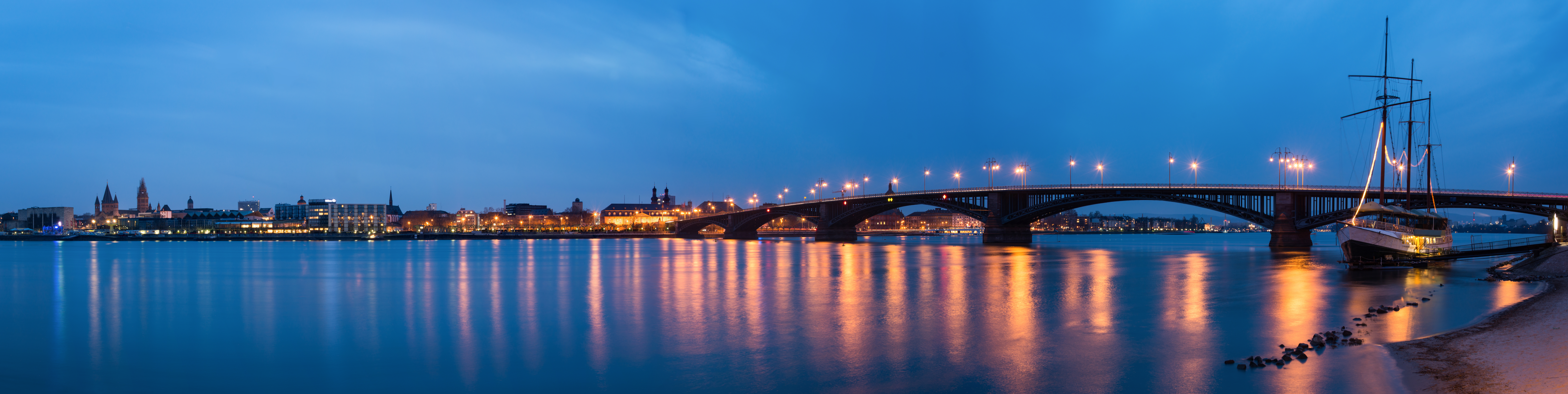
View of Mainz and the Theodor-Heuss-Bridge.

The Theodor Heuss Bridge is an arch bridge over the Rhine River connecting the Mainz-Kastel district of Wiesbaden, capital of state Hesse and the Rhineland-Palatinate state capital Mainz. The main span of the bridge is 102.94 meters (337.7 ft) long. It connects the Bundesstraßes 40 and 455. Initially it was just called “Straßenbrücke” (street bridge), later it was named after German statesman Theodor Heuss.

The Romans had built a bridge in this region in 27 AD, while the first arch bridge was inaugurated on 30 May 1885. Its construction costs of 3.6 million gold marks were recouped through tolls within three years although tolls continued to be levied until 1912. The bridge was widened from 1931 to 1934 but was destroyed on 17 March 1945 by German military engineers at the end of the second World War. To forestall a second Remagen, the Germans by 19 March had blown all Rhine bridges from Ludwigshafen northward.

It was rebuilt in the years 1948 to 1950 and partially reconstructed between 1992 and 1995 for a cost of 139.5 million marks.

== See also ==
- List of bridges in Germany
