= Ponte Punta Penna Pizzone =

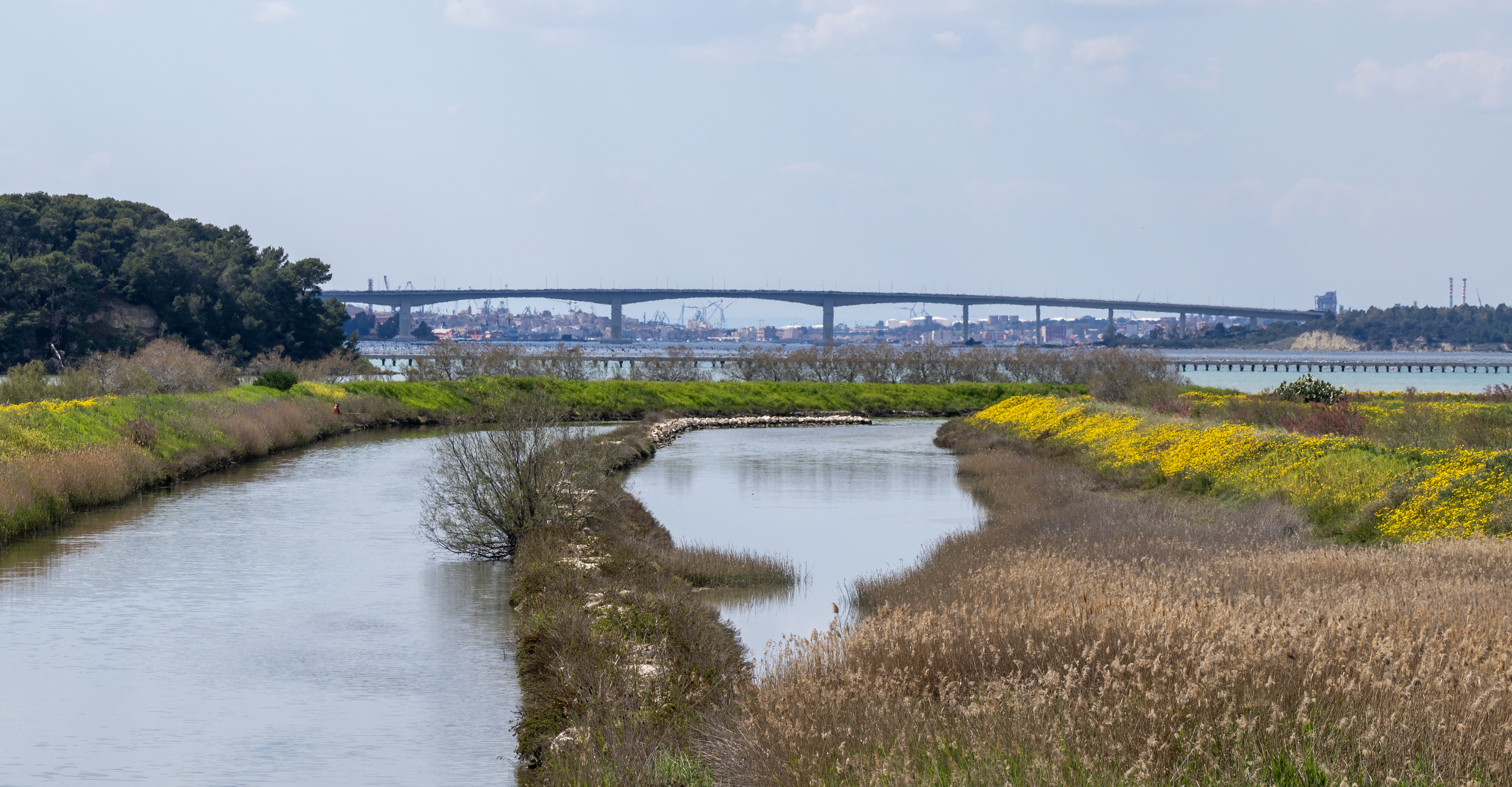
- Coordinates: 40°28′0″N 17°16′55″E
- Crosses: Gulf of Taranto
- Locale: Taranto, Italy

Characteristics
- Design: Girder bridge
- Total length: 1,909 metres (6,263 ft)
- Clearance below: 45 metres (148 ft)

History
- Opened: 30 July 1977

Ponte Punta Penna Pizzone also known as Ponte Aldo Moro is a girder bridge that spans Mar Piccolo in Taranto. The total length of the bridge is 1,909 m (6,263 ft). In 1978 it was named in honor of assassinated Italian politician Aldo Moro.
