= Zohar Bridge =

Bridge in Israel

Coordinates: 31.148576°N 35.362136°E

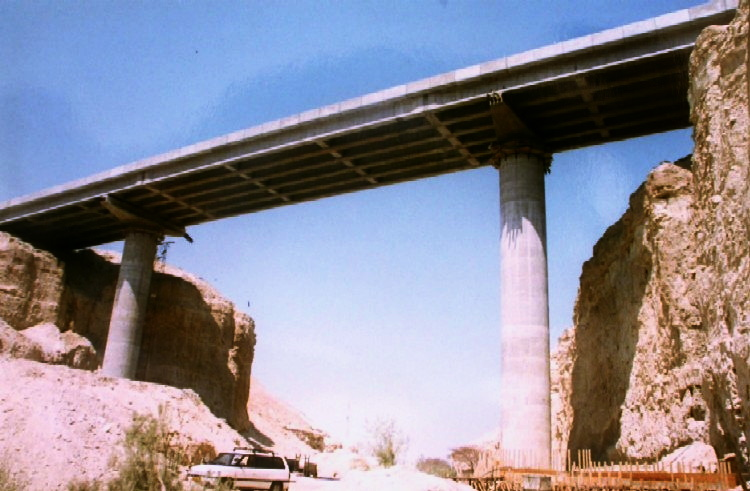
Zohar Bridge

The Zohar Bridge (Hebrew: גֶּשֶׁר זֹהַר, Gesher Zohar) is a bridge on Highway 90 near the Dead Sea in Israel. In terms of sea level, it is the lowest bridge on Earth. Located 40 meters above the river bed, it has maximum span of 52 meters.

== See also ==
- Neve Zohar
