= Mangfall Bridge =

Road bridge in Germany

Coordinates: 47°52′08″N 11°47′12″E

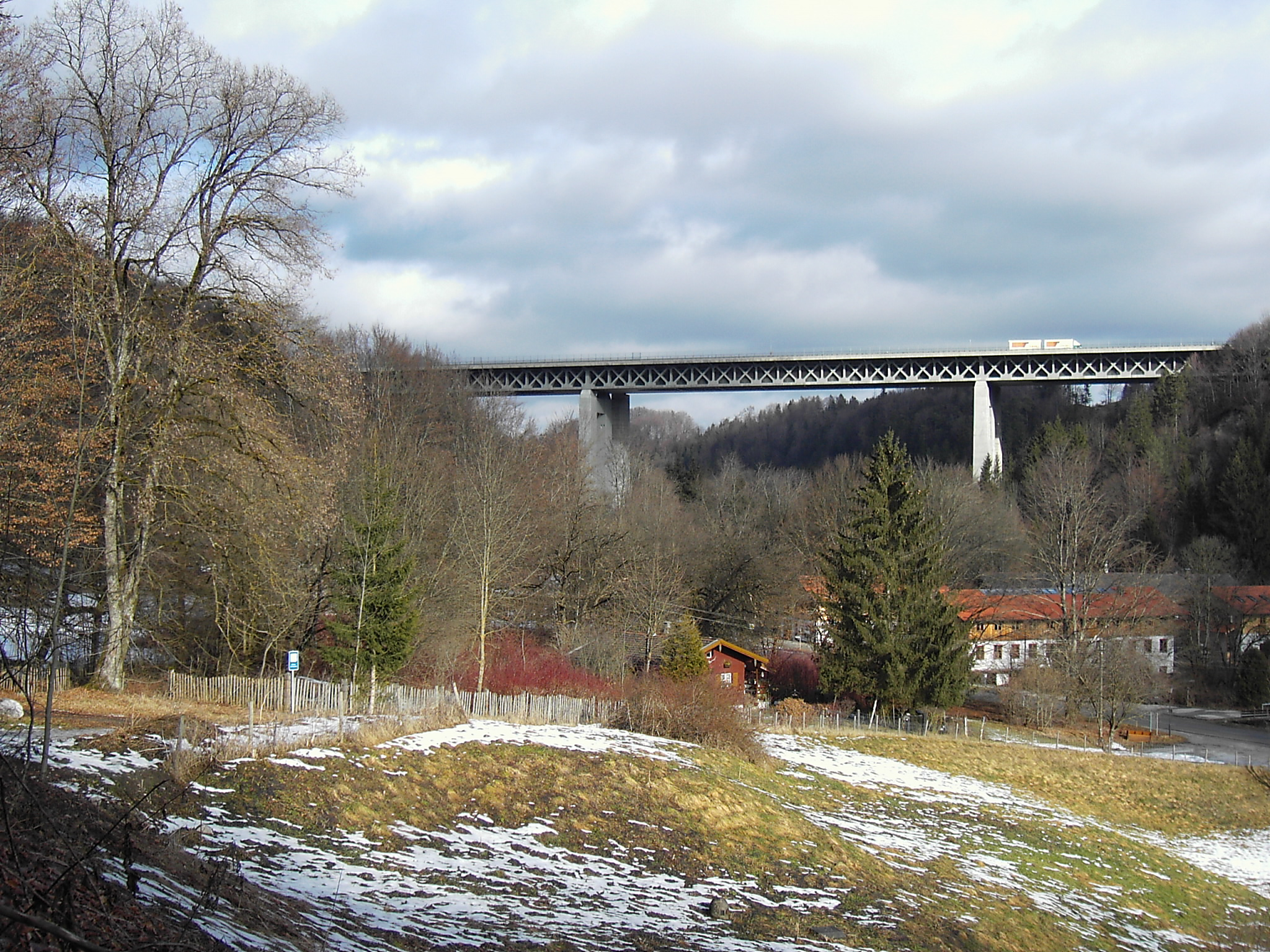
Mangfall Bridge, January 2008

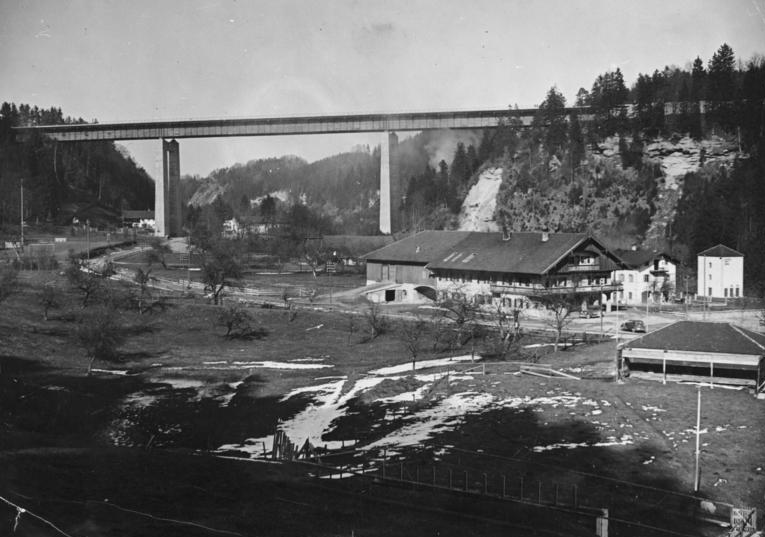
Original bridge designed by German Bestelmeyer, 1936

The Mangfall Bridge is a motorway bridge across the valley of the Mangfall north of Weyarn in Upper Bavaria, Germany, which carries Bundesautobahn 8 between Munich and Rosenheim. The original bridge, designed by German Bestelmeyer, opened in January 1936 as one of the first large bridges in the Reichsautobahn system and was influential in its design. Destroyed at the end of World War II, this bridge was replaced with a temporary structure in 1948; the current bridge consists of a replacement built in 1958–60 to a design by Gerd Lohmer and Ulrich Finsterwalder and a second span for traffic in one direction which was added in the late 1970s when the autobahn was widened to six lanes.

== Original bridge ==
The original bridge was one of the first large bridges constructed for the Reichsautobahn system under the Third Reich, and was the model for many that followed. It was a steel beam bridge 319 metres (1,047 ft) long, 108 metres (354 ft) wide and carried on two double pylons of reinforced concrete 68 metres (223 ft) high. Hitler selected German Bestelmeyer's design; with a single deck and only two massive support pylons, in concrete rather than steel, it was preferred on aesthetic grounds, and a model of one of the pylons dominated the Reichsautobahn section of the Gibt mir vier Jahre Zeit (Give me four years) exhibition of Nazi achievements in 1937. Its construction was a particularly favoured topic of the painters commissioned by Fritz Todt to document the Reichsautobahn, and also of documentary filmmakers, and the finished bridge was also one of the Reichsautobahn scenes depicted on a postage stamp in 1936. It was the most successful steel bridge on the Reichsautobahn and served as a model for several that followed.

Construction began in March 1934 and was mainly carried out by MAN SE of Gustavsburg. Completion of the two pylons was celebrated on 24 November. On 6 January 1936, Hitler was first to drive across the bridge. The autobahn segment was opened to traffic on 11 January.

In 1945, the retreating Wehrmacht destroyed the bridge with explosives: the deck and the western pylon were completely destroyed, the eastern pylon badly damaged.

== 1948 temporary bridge ==
Beginning in 1946, the bridge was rebuilt. A temporary steel truss bridge of the type designed by Gottwalt Schaper and used on the Reichsbahn was used on the rebuilt pylons, carrying one lane of traffic in each direction, and in 1958 this was moved to one side and beside it to the south, a supplemental pillar was erected beside each pylon. When the new replacement roadbed was complete, the temporary bridge was disassembled and the supplemental pillars demolished.

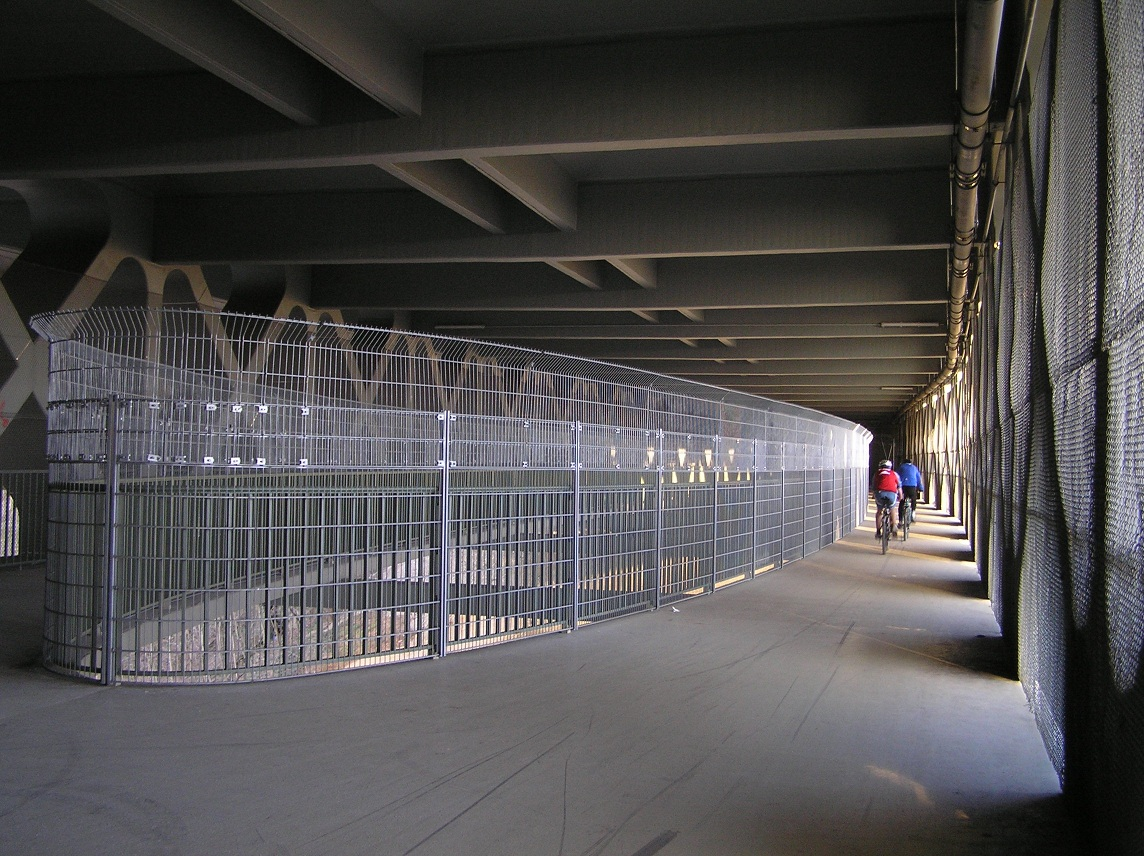
Pedestrian and bicycle path on lower level of 1960 bridge

== 1960 bridge ==
In 1957, Dyckerhoff & Widmann (Dywidag) won the contract to build a permanent replacement bridge to a design by Gerd Lohmer and Ulrich Finsterwalder. This bridge is 108 metres (354 ft) long and 63 metres (207 ft) above ground and is a prestressed concrete parallel-chord beam bridge with trusses 6.6 metres (22 ft) high consisting of posts and intersecting diagonals. It was the first use in Germany of prestressed concrete trusses. The bridge has a lower deck containing a pedestrian and bicycle path. The widths of the supports remained the same as in 1935; the deck is 23.5 metres (77 ft) wide. The bridge was constructed in 6 metres (20 ft) segments and the deck concreted in two sections. Construction took place from 1958 to 1960 and the total cost was DM 7.3 million.

== 1979 supplemental bridge ==
To accommodate the widening of the autobahn from its original four lanes to six, a supplemental bridge was added to the north to accommodate the northbound, Salzburg – Munich carriageway. This was built in 1977–1979 by the Max Aicher construction company and is a hollow prestressed concrete bridge which was launched incrementally from both abutments followed by concreting of the cantilevered deck sections.
