= Reichsautobahn =

Initial phase of the German Autobahn (limited access highway) network

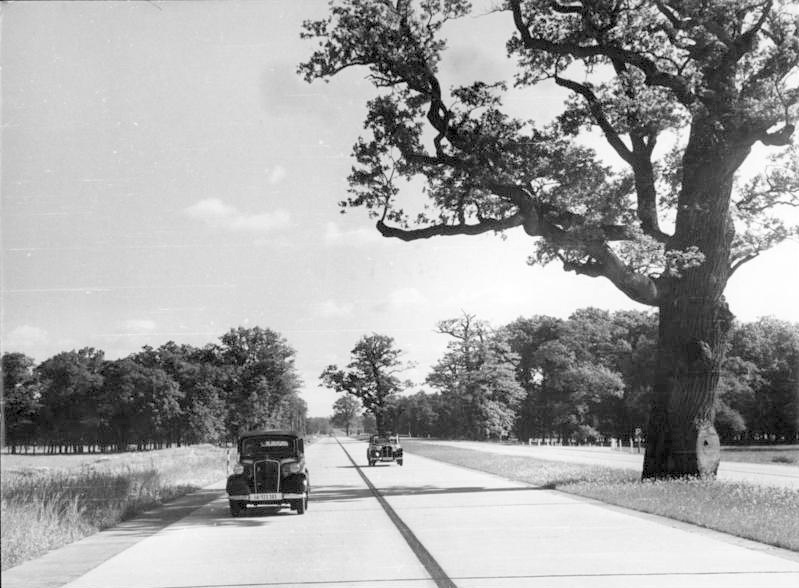
Berlin–Munich Reichsautobahn, today's A9, southeast of Dessau, photographed in 1939. The oaks were intentionally retained in the median strip.

Reichsautobahn car plaque

The Reichsautobahn system was the beginning of the German autobahns under Nazi Germany. There had been previous plans for controlled-access highways in Germany under the Weimar Republic, and two had been constructed, but work had yet to start on long-distance highways. After previously opposing plans for a highway network, the Nazis embraced them after coming to power and presented the project as Hitler's own idea. They were termed "The Fuehrer's roads" ("German: Straßen des Führers") and presented as a major contribution to the reduction of unemployment. Other reasons for the project included enabling Germans to explore and appreciate their country, and there was a strong aesthetic element to the execution of the project under the Third Reich, military applications, although to a lesser extent than has often been thought, a permanent monument to the Third Reich, often compared to the pyramids, and general promotion of motoring as a modernization that in itself had military applications.

Hitler turned the first sod on 23 September 1933, at Frankfurt, and work officially began simultaneously at multiple sites throughout the Reich the following spring. The first finished stretch, between Frankfurt and Darmstadt, opened on 19 May 1935, and the first 1,000 km (620 mi) were completed on 23 September 1936. After the annexation of Austria, the planned network was expanded to include the Ostmark, and a second soil-breaking ceremony for the first Reichsautobahn on formerly Austrian territory took place near Salzburg on 7 April 1938. When work ceased in 1941 because of World War II, 3,819.7 km (2,373.5 mi) had been completed.

== History ==
=== Background ===
Two controlled-access highways had been built prior to the Nazi era. The 10 km (6.2 mi) long AVUS (short for Automobil-Verkehrs- und Übungsstraße – automobile traffic and practice road) was built in Berlin starting in 1913. The corporation to build it was organized in 1909, and construction continued during World War I using prisoners of war, but it was not completed and officially opened until 1921. This was originally intended as a race track and was used for testing vehicles and road surfaces, but it had many of the characteristics of the later Reichsautobahn and served as a model for Piero Puricelli's 1924 autostrada between Milan and the northern Italian lakes, the first true motorway in the world. In 1929–32, a highway some 20 km (12 mi) long that also resembled the Reichsautobahn except for the lack of a median strip was built between Cologne and Bonn using unemployed labor; on the basis of this, the then Lord Mayor of Cologne and chairman of the provincial committee for autostraßen, Konrad Adenauer, could be credited as having built an autobahn before Hitler. The "Opladen bypass" between Cologne and Düsseldorf was also built in 1931–33. Adenauer also began construction of a ring road encircling Cologne, which was more in accord with demand at the time. According to a 1936–37 traffic survey, the highest road traffic was still around the major cities.

Corporations were also formed and plans drawn up for motorized highways between Mannheim and Heidelberg, between Munich and Berlin via Leipzig, between Munich and Lake Starnberg, between Leipzig and Halle, and between Cologne and Aachen, in addition to plans for networks totaling 15,000 km (9,300 mi) or 22,500 km (14,000 mi) in length. In 1930 the Ministry of Transportation became involved in trying to establish guidelines for the building of a highway network. Most notably, the organization known as HaFraBa or HAFRABA (an acronym for Verein zur Vorbereitung der Autostraße Hamburg–Frankfurt–Basel – Association for the preparation of the motorway Hamburg [later Hansestädte, Hanseatic cities, after Lübeck and Bremen were added] – Frankfurt – Basel), was founded in 1926 at the instigation of Willy Hof, who had been inspired by the Italian highways, and projected a north–south highway to be expanded into a network. Detailed engineering specifications were prepared, bound in 70 volumes, and this planning would form the basis of the Reichsautobahn network.

However, HAFRABA was never able to surmount the logistical problems of building a highway through many different jurisdictions, or the funding problems of such a large undertaking. Moreover, legislators condemned it as a luxury project that would benefit only the few wealthy enough to own cars; the Nazi Party was against public spending on highways for this reason, as were the Communists and the Reichsbahn, the German national railroad, which feared highways would take some of its freight business. Even the association of German car manufacturers did not support highway projects; they were concerned that long-distance driving would overtax their vehicles.

=== Planning and construction ===
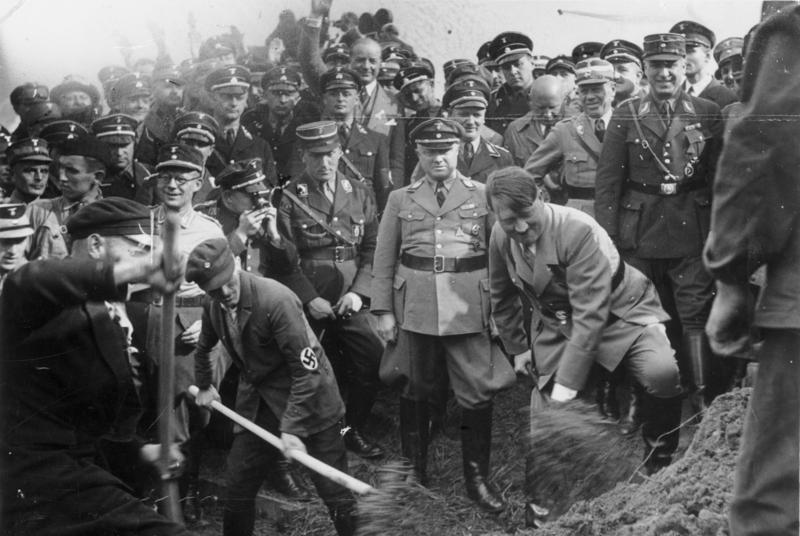
Hitler shoveling dirt at the ceremonial inauguration of Reichsautobahn construction on 23 September 1933; behind him on the right Fritz Todt, on the left two workers helping him

After the Nazis came to power at the end of January 1933, their position changed rapidly. Fritz Todt produced a report arguing for the building of highways, Straßenbau und Straßenverwaltung, known as the "Brown Report" (Braune Denkschrift or Brauner Bericht), and in a speech at the Berlin Motor Show on 11 February, Hitler presented it as a necessity and as the future measure of a people, as railroads had been in the past. A law establishing the Reichsautobahn project under that name was passed on 27 June 1933, and the Gesellschaft Reichsautobahnen (Reichsautobahns Association) was founded on 25 August as a subsidiary of the Reichsbahn, thereby removing its objections. Todt was named Generalinspektor für das deutsche Straßenwesen (Inspector-General for the German Road System) on 30 June. HAFRABA and other organizations were folded into the planning arm, known as GEZUVOR (Gesellschaft zur Vorbereitung der Reichsautobahn, Society for the Preparation of the Reichsautobahn). The Chairman of the Board of HAFRABA, Dr. Ludwig Landmann, the Mayor of Frankfurt, was Jewish, which provided the Nazis with a reason to take it over. The autobahn was presented to the German public as Hitler's idea: he was represented as having sketched out the future network of highways while in Landsberg Prison in 1924. They were to be "the Führer's roads", a myth promoted by Todt himself, who coined the phrase and warned close associates not to "in any way [let] the impression arise that I built the autobahns. They are to be reckoned as simply and solely the Führer's roads." Hof, an enthusiastic party member, resigned on 22 December 1934; the editor of the HAFRABA magazine, Kurt Kaftan, had caused a political problem by presenting Hof as the originator of the idea, or jointly responsible for it with Hitler. The overlapping responsibilities of the Gesellschaft Reichsautobahnen (in charge of construction) and of Todt's office (in charge of planning but also of all roads in the Reich) exemplified the growth of central authorities in the Third Reich and inevitably led to conflicts, but only on 1 January 1941 was the Gesellschaft Reichsautobahnen removed from the Reichsbahn and placed directly under Todt.

On 5 August 1933, a radio play by Peter Hagen and Hans Jürgen Nierenz, Wir bauen eine Straße ("We are Building a Road"), was broadcast throughout the Reich. On 23 September 1933, the first 720 unemployed marched to the Frankfurt Stock Exchange, where they were ceremonially invested with shovels as Reichsautobahn workers, then from there accompanied by SA men, marched behind Todt and Jakob Sprenger, the Reichsstatthalter of Hesse, to the bank of the Main. There after further speeches, Hitler was to inaugurate work on the autobahn system with the first ceremonial shoveling of dirt to form the base of an embankment. However, as Todt described the scene in an illustrated album published in 1935, "again and again his shovel plunged into the mound [of dirt]. This was no symbolic shoveling; this was real construction work!" Two of the workers "sprang ... to help him", and they worked "until the mound had been dealt with in an orderly fashion and ... the first drops of sweat were dripping from his brow onto the earth." The image of Hitler shoveling was used many times in propaganda, including superimposed on the workers' march in Heinrich Hoffmann's poster urging Germans to ratify the Nazi government in the November 1933 Reichstag election. The location was marked with a park and a commemorative stone.

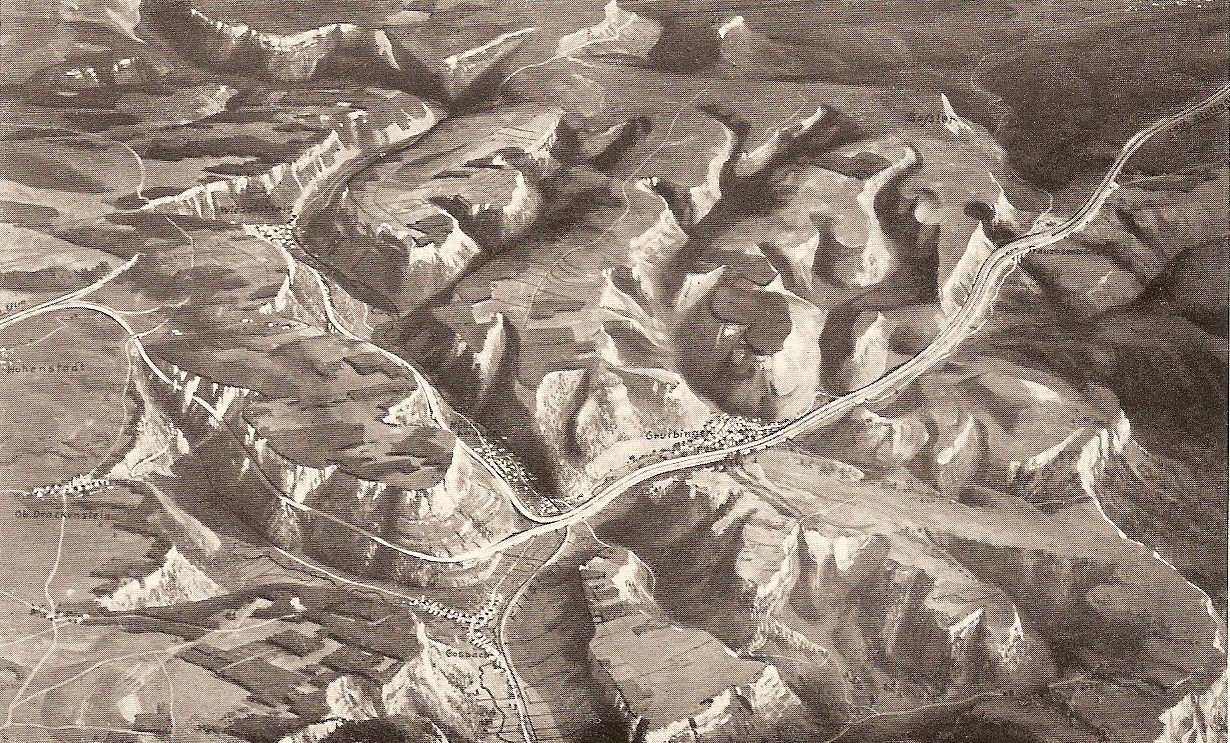
Layout of the Drackensteiner Hang project: to negotiate the steep terrain with minimum disturbance, the two directions were routed on different sides of the mountain

Preparatory work at several sites was done over the following winter, but full-scale construction officially began on 21 March 1934, as the showpiece of the opening of the Arbeitsschlacht ("work battle"), which also included construction of dams and residences and agricultural work. Autobahn work sites had been established at 22 locations, governed by 9 regional work divisions (which became 15 by mid-1934), distributed throughout the Reich for maximum public visibility, and work was ceremonially initiated at 15 of the sites. At Unterhaching, Hitler made a short speech ending with the command, "Fanget an!" ("Begin!") This was broadcast nationwide on the radio, after which his representatives opened work with the first shoveling of dirt at the other 14 locations: Hermann Göring at Finowfurth near Berlin, for example. A monument in the highway median at Unterhaching later commemorated the event: it took the form of a cylinder inscribed with Hitler's command and the date and surmounted by shovels in the manner of weapons on a military monument. 15,000 workers were now engaged; however, at several of the work sites, the men were immediately sent home because mechanized excavations and other preparation had to be done first. According to a Sopade report in April–May 1934, only 6,000 workers on a 67 km (42 mi) stretch between Frankfurt and Heidelberg and 700 on a 7 km (4.3 mi) stretch between Munich and the border were actually active. GEZUVOR presented its 788 volumes of plans to Todt on 1 June 1934.

Despite initial promises that the first segment would open in September 1934, to coincide with the one-year anniversary of the ground-breaking and 7th International Road Congress, this did not happen until 19 May 1935, when the 22 km (14 mi) stretch between Frankfurt and Darmstadt was opened. Hitler rewarded Todt with a three-axle Mercedes-Benz touring car. Two further segments opened that year, a total of 108 km (67 mi). The celebration of the first 1,000 km (620 mi) took place on 27 September 1936 at Breslau (now Wrocław, Poland), five segments being opened to traffic that day. 2,000 km (1,200 mi) were completed by the end of 1937, and 3,000 km (1,900 mi) by the end of 1938, when the planned network was also extended from 7,000 km (4,300 mi) to 12,000 km (7,500 mi) after the annexation of Austria and the Sudetenland. A second inaugural ceremony for the first autobahn construction on formerly Austrian soil took place on 7 April 1938, with Hitler shoveling dirt into a decorated dumpster near Salzburg, and on 1 December 1938, Rudolf Hess broke ground at Eger for a projected "transit autobahn" from Breslau to Vienna via Brünn (Brno). However, the emphasis on east–west connections and on attracting foreign tourists and promoting automobile touring meant that the completed sections did not constitute a useful network for freight transportation until 1937. In 1938, construction priorities shifted with the preparation for war. Todt was given responsibility for building the Westwall, and in 1939 only 237 km (147 mi) were added to the Reichsautobahn. In addition, Hitler ordered important sections of the autobahns to be widened, from 24 m (79 ft) to 26.5 m (87 ft) and ultimately to 28.5 m (94 ft), which further diverted resources from building new sections.

Working conditions were hard and the pay very low, because it was based on the lowest local wage and unlike unemployment payments did not include an allowance for living expenses. There was also no payment until winter 1938 for bad weather days when work could not take place. Workers were initially housed in barracks, barns, industrial buildings, and tents, and complained about the work, the conditions, and the pay. On 18 October 1934, the workers on the Hamburg-Bremen segment of the autobahn at Gyhum went on strike; the 141 who could not be talked into resuming work were transported to Berlin for interrogation by the Gestapo. To avoid a recurrence of such problems, a policy was put in place of investigating men for political reliability before they were hired for work on the autobahn, access to the workers' camps was restricted, a surveillance network was instituted in which the Gestapo participated increasingly, and the few SA members among the workers were organized into Baustürme ("construction storms") that provided both example and intimidation at work sites. There were nonetheless several further strikes in 1935, and increasing numbers of fires were ascribed to sabotage by disgruntled workers. Todt attempted to make worker housing into "worthy lodgings", and had camps specially built, beginning with a model camp at Werbellin on the Berlin-Stettin autobahn that was opened in December 1934. Kraft durch Freude entertainment, books, and propaganda movies were also provided from that point on. One worker wrote in 1975 of the camp where he had lived in 1937 that he would still describe the living conditions as "absolutely model". However, conditions remained very poor. Work sites were often remote, as far as two hours' march from the camp, and had no access to food or water. The pressure on the workers was considerable, especially after Hitler publicly alluded in 1937 to the objective of completing 1,000 km (620 mi) a year. After mid-1936, workdays lasting 11 to 12 hours were the norm. There was a high incidence of back injuries to men who were unaccustomed to physical work after long unemployment and in many cases undernourished. Numerous accidents occurred, some fatal, due to the rapid pace of work, exhaustion, and unfamiliarity with heavy machinery; after the first five years, one worker died per 6 km (3.7 mi) completed.

As the economy improved and the rearmament effort accelerated, it became impossible to find enough workers; they were for a while brought in from the big cities where unemployment remained highest, primarily Hamburg and Berlin, but in 1937 full employment was achieved, and armaments factories offered far superior pay and working conditions. The policy of minimizing the use of machinery was reversed and pay was increased, those unemployed who refused assignment to the autobahn were punished by suspension of benefits for up to 12 weeks, and after the annexation of Austria and of the Sudetenland, workers from there were almost immediately put to work on the autobahn, but increasingly the project used forced labor of various kinds. Several times, up to 1,400 youths fulfilling their obligation to work through the Reichsarbeitsdienst were used as autobahn workers, mostly doing simple hard labor, in November 1937, women and school-age children were put to work at a site in Silesia, and soon after, 17 and 18-year-olds in Hanover. Eventually, the inmates of re-education camps—the "work-shy", Social Democrats and Communists—constituted the majority of Reichsautobahn workers, and during the war increasing numbers of prisoners of war were used. The war also removed the main obstacle to using prison inmates and Jews from the concentration camps, that foreign visitors would see the necessary armed guards and form a bad impression; previously they had been used only at remote locations such as quarries. In October 1939 an SS re-education camp was built at Hinzert that housed recalcitrant workers on the autobahn as well as the Westwall; in all, 50 forced labor camps were established for Reichsautobahn workers, and transferred to regular SS use when construction stopped. In fall 1940, an internal report counted approximately 62,600 workers engaged on the autobahn, of whom approximately 21,900 were contract workers, 300 women, 28,600 prisoners including prisoners of war, 1,100 Poles, 5,700 Czechs, and 4,700 other foreigners.

The Reichsautobahn network as it was ultimately conceived was to extend into most of the planned Lebensraum in the conquered territories; along with a trio of eastward and southward extensions of the extreme broad-gauge Breitspurbahn rail system, the highways were intended to provide the main connections for the "settlement strings" of German immigrant Wehrbauer communities to be located in conquered Soviet territory. The addition of Austria to the Reich in 1938 resulted in an extension of the previously Vienna-centered road system and major planning and construction efforts in the Alpine regions. The West Autobahn between Vienna and Salzburg was started within weeks with much publicity, but only a few kilometers around Salzburg were finished by 1942.

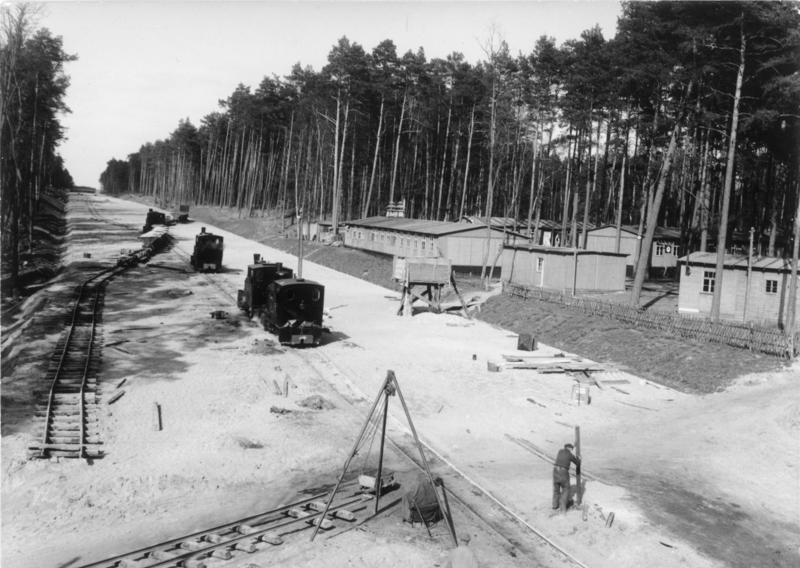
Reichsautobahn work site near Berlin, April 1936

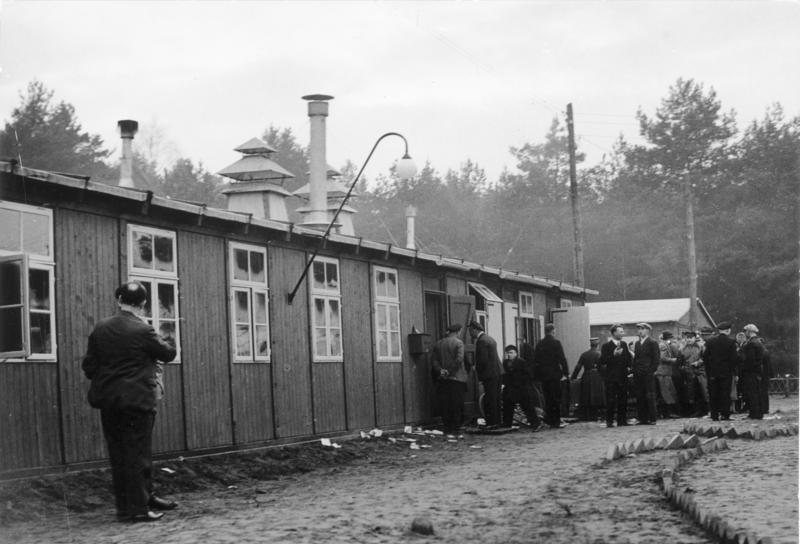
A workers' barrack

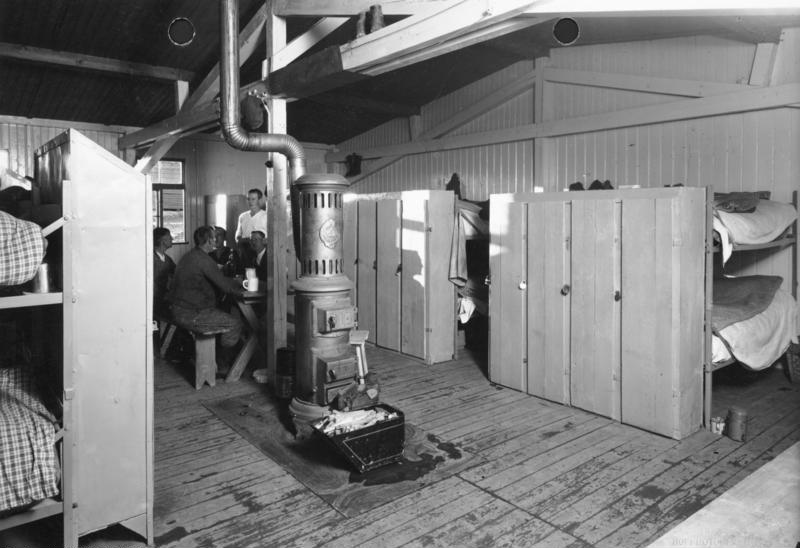
Bunk room in workers' camp, 1934

=== World War II ===
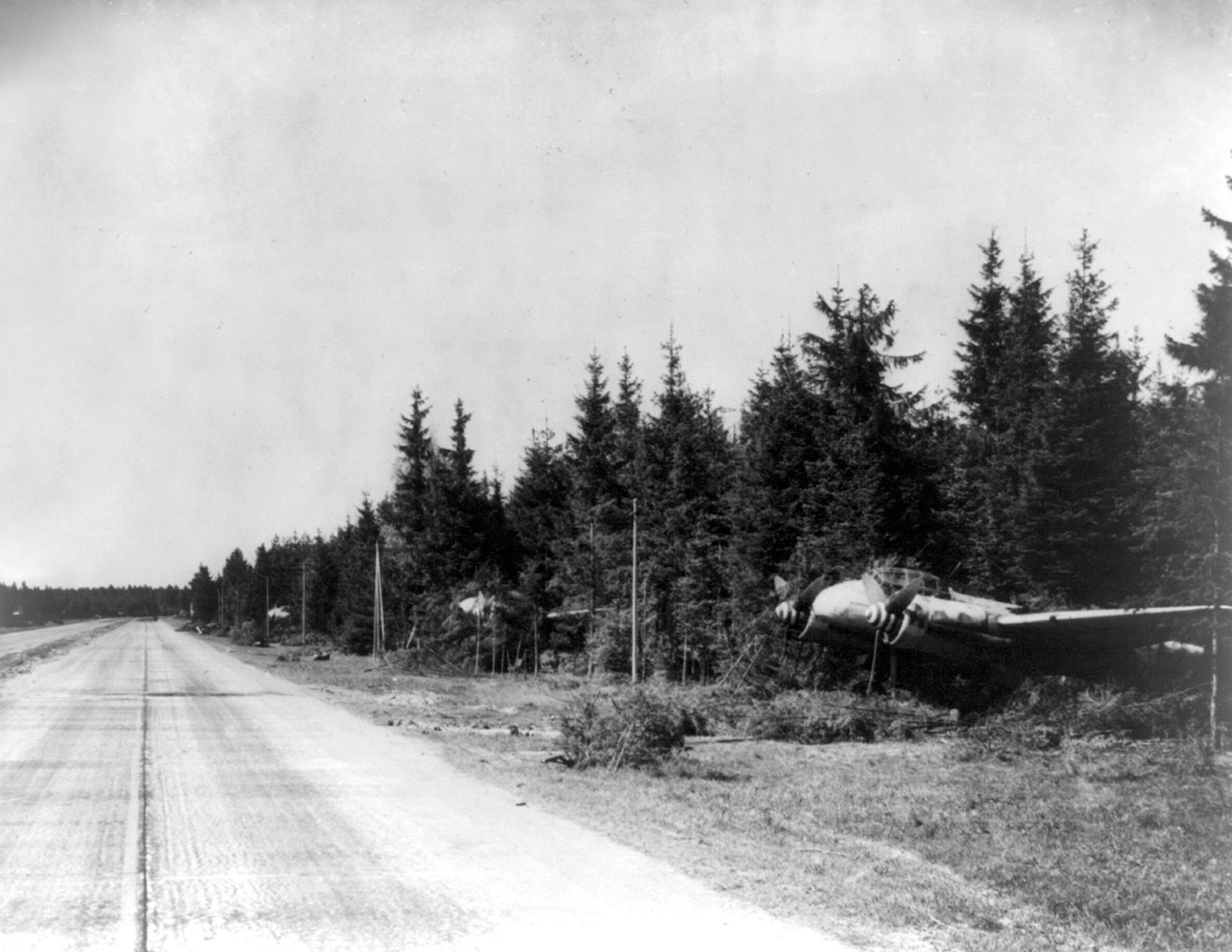
German Ju 88 warplanes concealed along the autobahn in 1945

After the war began in September 1939, a further 560 km (350 mi) of autobahn were completed, bringing the total to 3,870 km (2,400 mi), before work ceased almost entirely in late 1941 with the worsening of the war situation in Russia. This included the connection of the Avus to the ring road around Berlin, celebrated on 23 September 1940, the seventh anniversary of Hitler's opening of the project. Work on approximately 3,000 km (1,900 mi) had begun but remained unfinished; of this, work had stopped on approximately 1,000 km (620 mi) in October 1940. Completion of the 4,000th kilometer was foreseen and a medallion designed to celebrate it, but that milestone was never reached. The engineers were put to work restoring bridges in the occupied territories and later, converting rail tracks in the USSR to standard gauge. In 1942 Albert Speer, who succeeded Todt after his death, folded the Reichsautobahn completely into the war-oriented Organisation Todt.

In July 1941, Dieter Wisliceny, the Judenberater for Slovakia, invited Slovak government officials to tour several Reichsautobahn camps in Upper East Silesia. During the trip, the Reichsautobahn made inquiries about the use of Slovak Jews on its construction projects. However, Izidor Koso, president of the Interior Ministry, commented that the Germans' methods were "un-Christian and inhumane" and Slovakia would have to find another way. The visitors understood that Jews in Poland lived under conditions that would eventually cause mass death.

A speed limit of 100 km/h (62 mph) had been imposed in May 1939 to save fuel; during the war this was lowered to 80 km/h (50 mph), and private cars were allowed on the autobahns only in exceptional circumstances (by 1943, traffic was so low that bicycles were permitted). Other than official traffic, which picked up toward the end of the war, the autobahns were used for some deliveries of tank parts and finished U-boats and motor-boats, and as runways for fighter planes, including in one case for final assembly and test flights of Messerschmitt Me 262s after the factories in Augsburg and Regensburg were bombed. As the war progressed, vehicles were at risk of strafing by Allied aircraft. However, most damage to the autobahns was caused late in the war by the retreating Wehrmacht, which blew up numerous bridges in an effort to slow the Allied advance; on 19 March 1945, Hitler ordered the destruction in retreat of "all military, transportation, news, industrial, and provisions facilities".

=== Post-war ===
After the war, the Reichsautobahns were declared national property of the various post-war states (for example Bundesvermögen, federal property, under Article 90 of the Basic Law for the Federal Republic of Germany in 1949) and became the foundation of the modern autobahn networks in Germany and Austria. Several stretches were no longer within the redrawn German borders, notably the unfinished highway between Berlin and Königsberg (now Kaliningrad, Russia), now known unofficially as the Berlinka. Others were no longer useful because of the altered borders, including the occupation zone boundary that became the inner German border between the Federal Republic and the German Democratic Republic. A stretch of highway near Kaiserslautern became the access road to the U.S. Ramstein Air Base. Most of the destroyed bridges were either reconstructed or rebuilt in a different style, although the Saale River Bridge at Rudolphstein, on the inner German border, was not replaced until the 1960s. The debris of the destroyed bridges still lies below the rebuilt series of viaducts at the Drackensteiner Hang in the Swabian Alps. Elsewhere, unfinished autobahn construction was left abandoned; the Wommen Viaduct, also on the inner German border, was completed in 1993, after German reunification.

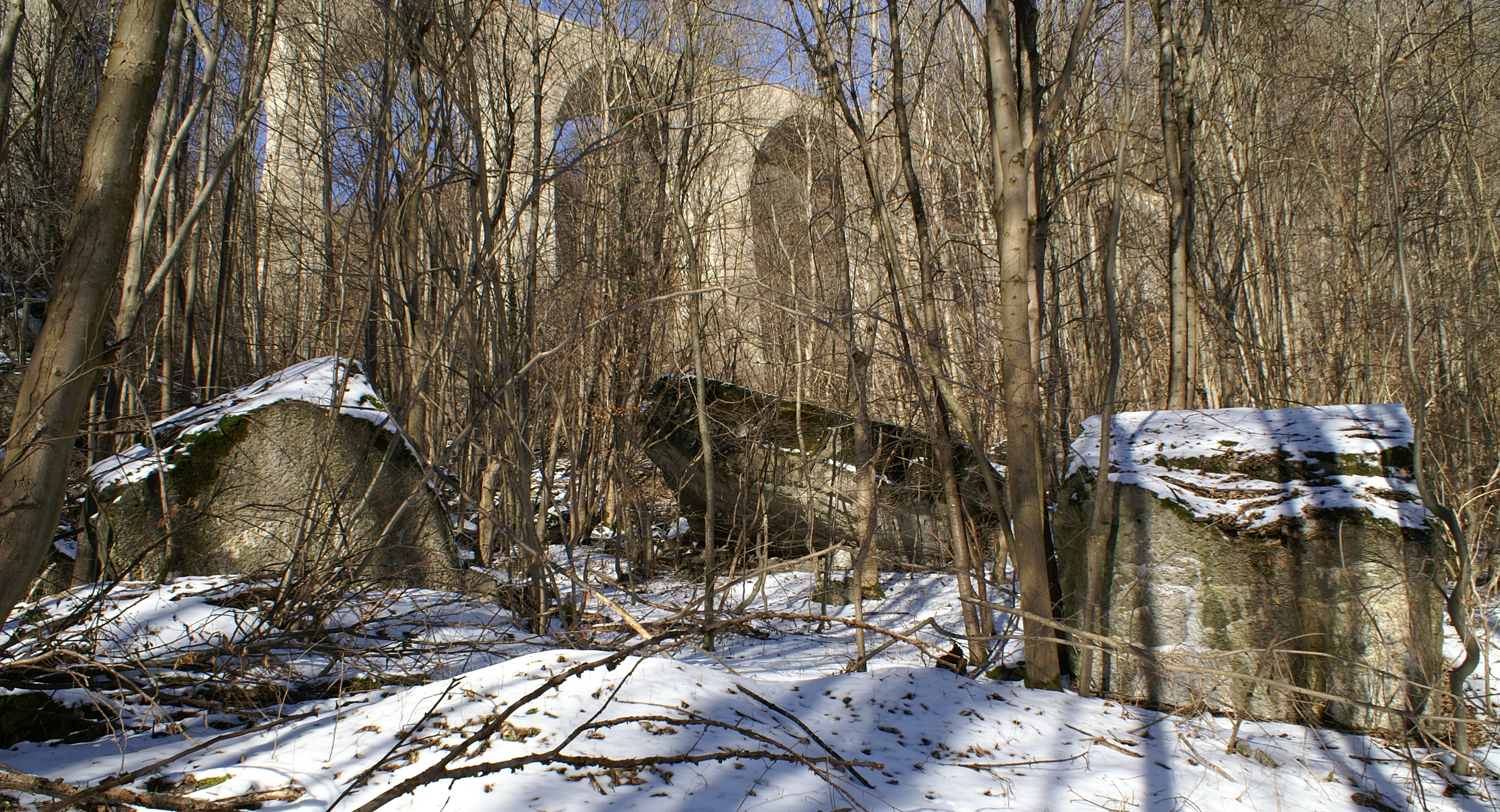
Debris from the original Drachenloch Bridge below the reconstructed bridge, at the Drackensteiner Hang in the Swabian Alps

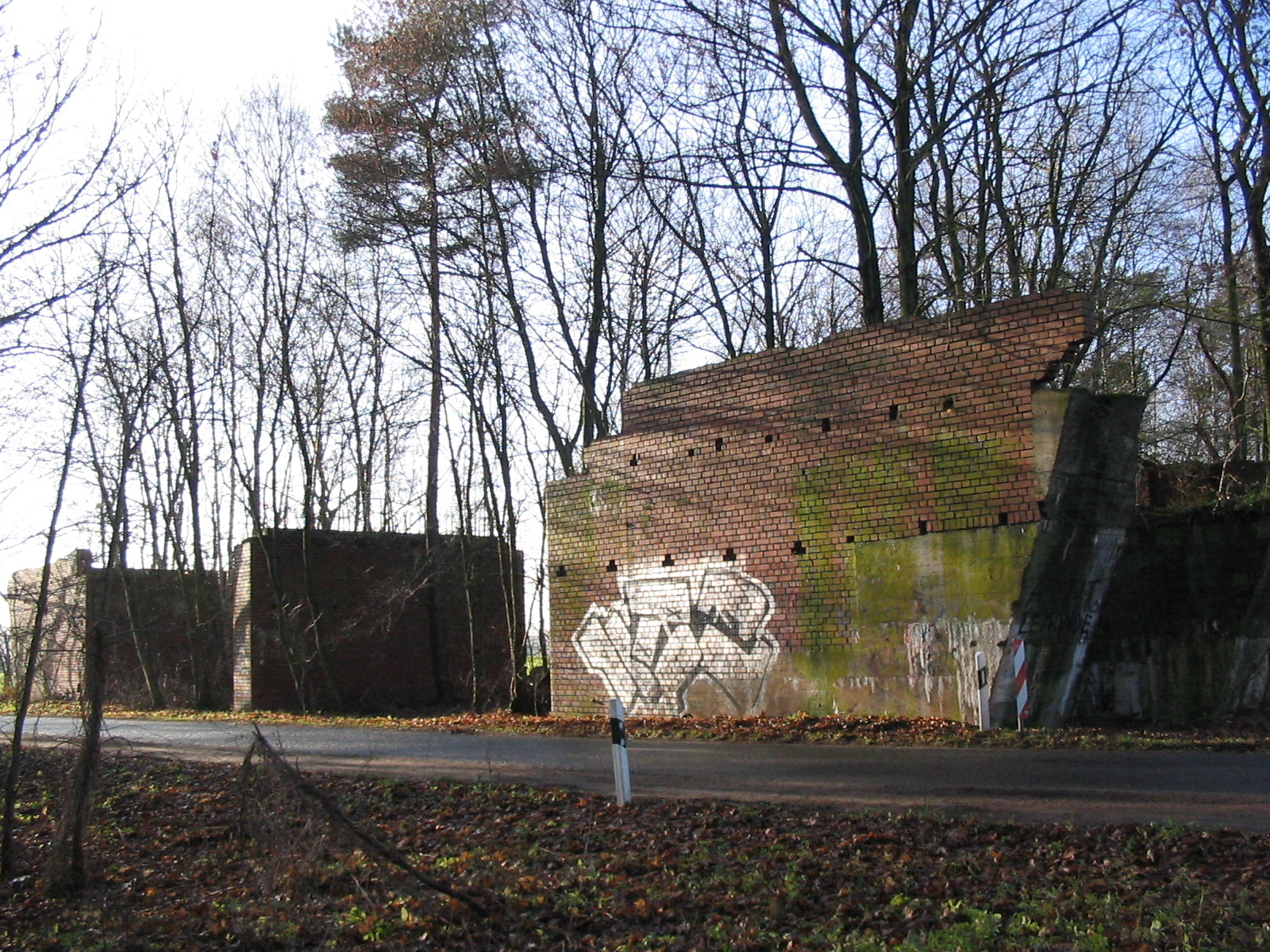
Bridge abutments for Hamburg - Berlin autobahn left incomplete, near Hagenow, Mecklenburg-Vorpommern, in the former GDR

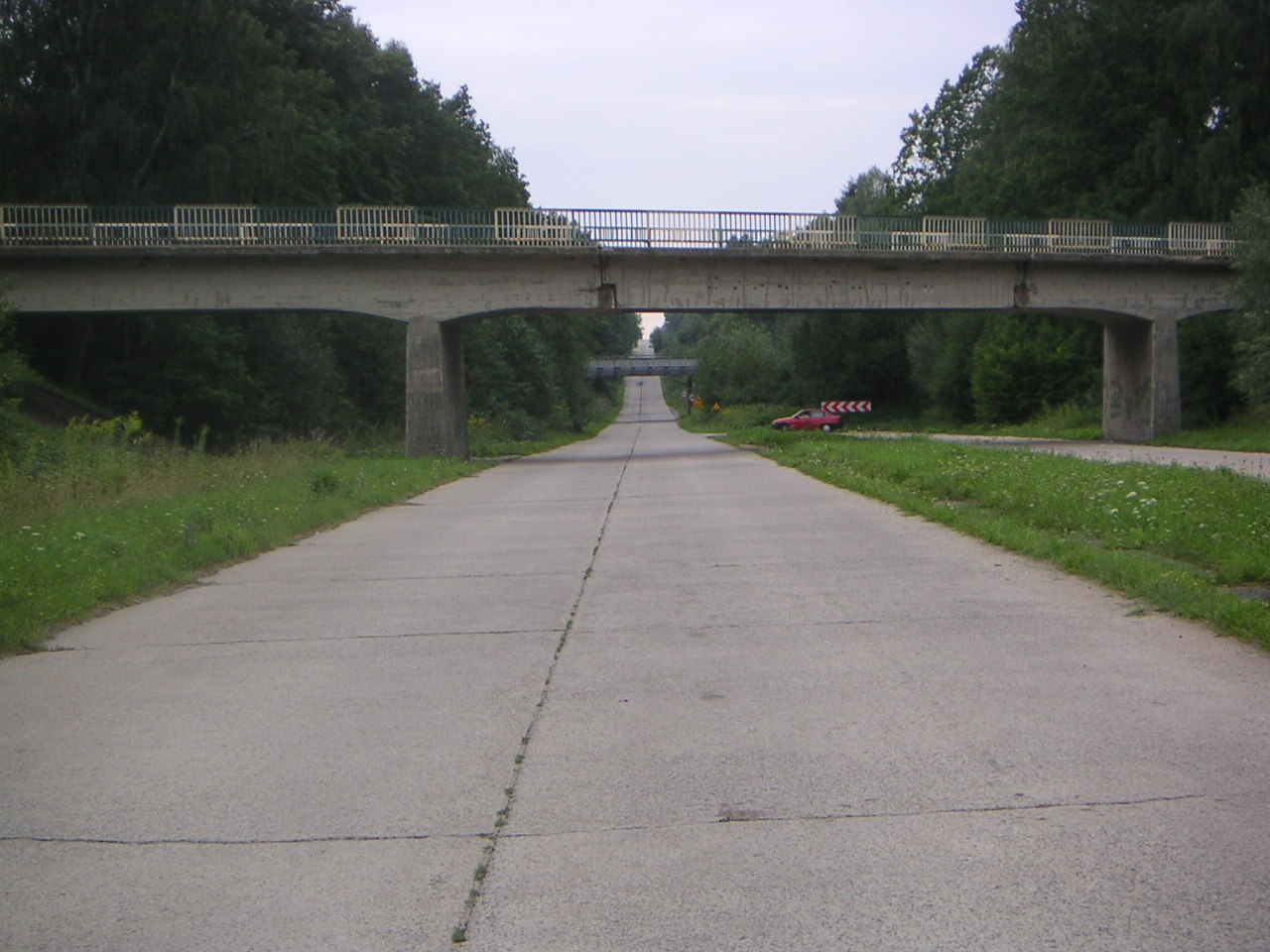
Stretch of the "Berlinka" Berlin - Königsberg autobahn near Elbląg in Poland (formerly Elbing, East Prussia) in 2006; this segment has since been upgraded as part of Expressway S22

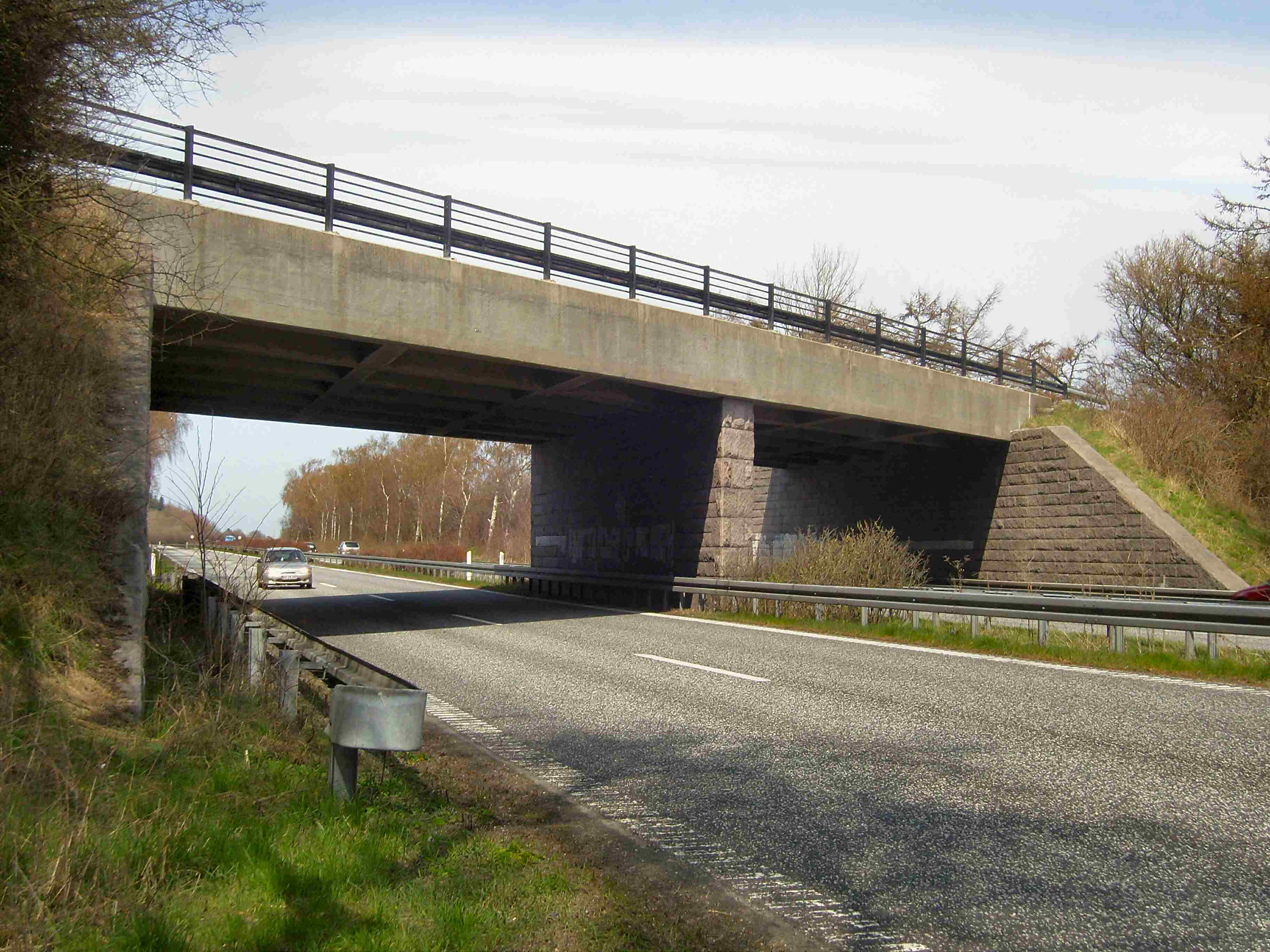
Reichsautobahn bridge near Maribo in Denmark, now part of Sydmotorvejen (European Routes E47 and E55)

== Technical specifications and financing ==
The specifications for the autobahns were based on those developed by HAFRABA. They were designed as four-lane limited-access highways, with a central median, road surfaces in each direction normally 24 m (79 ft) wide (widened on some major segments immediately before the war), surfaced in concrete. There were no shoulders. In addition to having no intersections, the route was to limit grades as much as possible, to no more than 8%, and curves were to fall within a range of 600 m (660 yd) and 1,800 m (2,000 yd) in radius. One segment just south of Dessau of roughly 10 km in length was designed for speed record attempts (the Dessauer Rennstrecke) and had six lanes in each direction.

The network as planned had three east–west highways (between the Ruhr and Berlin via Hanover, between the Southwest and Munich via Stuttgart, and between the Main-Neckar region and Breslau via Erfurt and Leipzig), two north–south (between the Hanseatic cities and Basel via Frankfurt and between Königsberg and Munich via Stettin—now Szczecin in Poland—Berlin, and Nuremberg), and diagonal connections between Berlin and Hamburg and Breslau. HAFRABA's main north–south route was truncated; it was only completed in 1962. However, in addition to the extension of plans into the former Austria, as territories were added to the Reich during the early phases of the war, Reichsautobahn planning was extended to include them. Autobahn engineers went into Poland before the invasion was complete, Hitler ordered the incorporation of a highway reaching from Aachen through Brussels to Calais, and autobahns between Trier and Paris via Luxembourg, between Oslo and Trondheim in Norway, and between Yaroslavl and Kiev in the USSR and Riga, Latvia, and Leningrad were all being planned in 1940–41. Ground was broken by Todt himself on 14 September 1941, for the autobahn between Lübeck and Copenhagen.

When construction was stopped, of the 3,870 km (2,400 mi) of completed highway segments, approximately 80% was surfaced in concrete, approximately 10% paved, and the remaining 10% surfaced with asphalt. This compared to approximately 565 km (351 mi) of concrete-surfaced roads in the Reich in 1933. Some stretches were only completed in one direction; in some low-traffic areas, particularly in Thuringia and Silesia, this was planned.

The Reichsautobahn was initially to be financed by a road use tax, but in 1936 this was rejected and instead fuel taxes were raised and car owners taxed. In addition, the Reichsbahn and the national bank provided loans. However, approximately 60% of the financing came from the Reichsanstalt für Arbeitsvermittlung und Arbeitslosenversicherung, the government employment department. At the end of the war, total costs were 6.5 billion Reichsmarks (equivalent to €26 billion in 2021), of which 4.6 billion RM was still owed, almost 74% to the employment department. Costs were inflated by the aesthetic requirements, by shortages of raw materials, by the need to repair work that had been performed poorly under time pressure, and by the initial failure to include in the cost estimates connector roads between the autobahns and existing roads. In post-war Germany, opinions of the Reichsautobahn included recognizing that it had been a white elephant.

== Objectives ==
=== Employment ===
Workers employed directly in Reichsautobahn construction per quarter, December 1933 through December 1936

Reduction of unemployment was presented as the main reason for the Reichsautobahn project, and propaganda both used the autobahn to represent the Arbeitsschlacht and Nazi reduction of unemployment in general and emphasized the project's role. This included misleading graphs and exaggerated statistics. For the first two years of construction, mechanization was avoided so far as possible in order to create more work (although lack of machinery was also a factor). Numerous celebrations all over the Reich kept the project in the public eye. It was therefore logical from the point of view of the regime that the majority of funding came from the employment department. Todt had foreseen the creation of at least 600,000 jobs. However, autobahn employment peaked in 1936 at 124,483 directly employed in construction and a similar number in the supply chain, so that the autobahn never directly or indirectly employed more than 250,000 workers. Rearmament was responsible for a far greater share of unemployment reduction, and the peak years of autobahn employment came long after the first two years of Nazi rule, when the need for jobs was most urgent.

=== Motorization and military applications ===
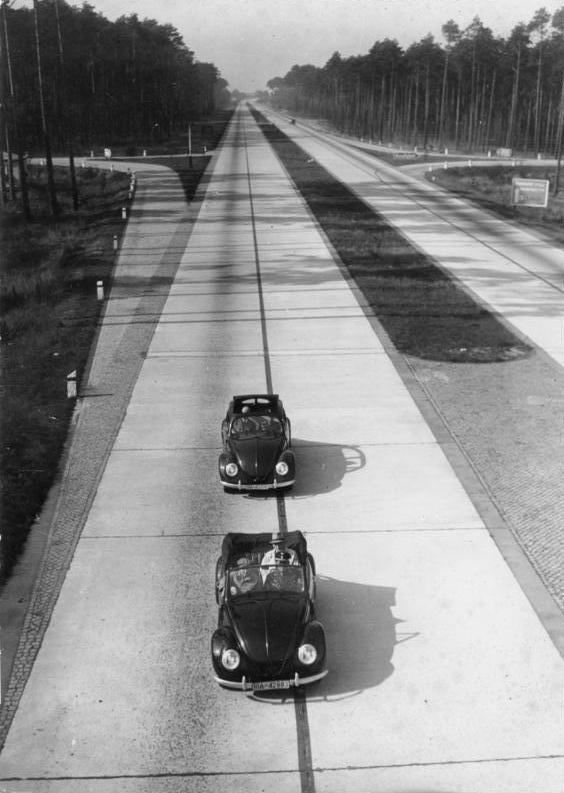
Autobahn view with two Volkswagens: propaganda photo celebrating 10 years of Nazi achievements, January 1943

Another important reason for building highways was to motorize Germany. This accorded with the Nazis' self-presentation as modernizers. On 11 February 1933, at the Berlin Motor Show, Hitler had already presented promotion of motoring as an important objective, and named an extensive road-building program as the third on his list of four means of realizing it. Weimar Germany was car-mad, and the number of private vehicles had increased from 130,346 in 1924 to 489,270 in 1932, but the percentage of car owners lagged behind that in other European countries, not to mention the U.S. This was still true in 1937; at best, most Germans could afford a motorbike, not a car, and the following year the highway commissioner of the State of Michigan observed, "Germany has the roads while we have the traffic." Car ownership was a "powerful public desire". Motoring and the use of the autobahn for outings were heavily promoted. German manufacturers produced touring buses for the non-car-owning public, and the Volkswagen (then called the KdF-Wagen, Strength Through Joy car, for the Nazi recreation organization) was developed and marketed in association with the autobahn to promote car ownership; Hitler first publicly called for its development at the opening of the first Reichsautobahn segment. The war effort put an end to efforts at mass motorization, as savings and production cability for the KdF-Wagen instead went into the Kübelwagen, the military version for all the branches (Wehrmacht Heer, Kriegsmarine and Luftwaffe) of the combined Wehrmacht armed forces. Mass production of the "Beetle" started only after 1945.

Motorization clearly had a military application, providing trucks and drivers that could be used by the military. In addition, Todt's report cited troop transportation as a reason to develop highways: he stated that using 100,000 requisitioned vehicles, it would be possible to transport 300,000 shock troops the width of the Reich in two nights. A second memorandum written six months later by Gottfried Feder also stressed military uses. The military disagreed. Georg Halter, professor of road construction and railroads at the Technical University of Munich and a Nazi Party member, wrote several pieces beginning in fall 1933 in which he contested Todt's report, with respect to strategic applications pointing out that road vehicles had less than a third of the weight capacity of railroad freight wagons, in addition to which the steel wheel-rims and treads of armored vehicles would severely damage the roadway. He also regarded the light-colored concrete that was to be used for the roadways as a guide for enemy aircraft (beginning in 1937, the surface was tinted black for this reason, which distressed Hitler) and the planned large viaducts as tempting targets, "like honey to wasps". Border segments that could have been useful at the start of the war had not been completed because of earlier fears that enemies would use them to invade, and weight testing was not performed until March 1939. The German military rarely used the autobahns for troop movements (one of the exceptions being transporting flak units); they were used much more extensively at war's end by the advancing Allies, who did indeed damage them in the process. In fact as the war continued, fuel shortages led the German military to make increasing use of horses rather than motorized transportation.

It was once common to consider military applications as having been the true main reason the Nazis constructed autobahns, but historians now generally agree that this was an exaggeration. Foreigners suggested a covert military purpose for the Reichsautobahns as early as 1934, but a 1946 British Intelligence report noted that sections that would have been militarily useful were not completed and that some completed sections were not apparently used during the war. The project did, however, develop logistical skills and technology that were used for military purposes, notably in the building of the Westwall under Todt's supervision, and it disguised the development of those resources.

=== Aesthetics ===
A purpose for the project that increasingly came to the fore was to unify Germany, by enabling Germans to explore it and appreciate its beauty; including the new territories that had been added to the Reich under the Nazis; Albert Speer stated that the autobahns were uniform in design to express the unity of the Reich. In 1933 Todt hired Alwin Seifert, a landscape architect, as his deputy on the Reichsautobahn project and gave him the title Reichslandschaftsanwalt (Reich supervisor of landscape protection). Seifert called for architects, rural planners, plant sociology experts and ecologists to contribute to the effort, and maps were made of the native vegetation with the intention of preserving it and providing a "genuine" experience of the landscape. A Landschaftsanwalt (counsel for the landscape) was appointed in each construction district to ensure minimum harm, and in 1935 Hitler temporarily stopped work on the Berlin - Munich autobahn near Bayreuth because of harm to the landscape.

Nonetheless, the first completed segments were based on the HAFRABA plans and thus consisted of straightaways 4 to 5 km (2.5 to 3.1 mi) long joined by curves that were arcs of circles, as in railroads; the minimum radius of the curves was defined in planning documents (2,000 m (2,200 yd), less in mountainous terrain, down to 400 m (440 yd)). A debate spearheaded by Seifert, who argued that straight stretches were "unnatural" and moreover would lead to accidents through highway hypnosis, led to increasing dominance of the view that the autobahns should provide, as Emil Maier-Dorn put it in 1938, "not the shortest but, rather, the most sublime connection between two points". By 1939 and possibly earlier, sinuous forms predominated. Although Todt had hired Seifert and his landscapers in order to ensure the "German character" of the autobahn, he initially favored the railroad engineers' views on layout; the decisive factor was cost, namely the reduction in the number of embankments and bridges needed.

The showpiece aesthetic stretch of the Reichsautobahn was the Irschenberg on the autobahn from Munich to the Austrian border, where instead of passing through the valley, the highway was routed in a curving path up the hill to the summit, from which there was a full view of the Alps to the south. A rest stop was located there. (The Irschenberg autobahn segment was one of those that limited the usefulness of the highways for freight transport, and with the increase in traffic after the war it became a notorious bottleneck and accident site. Many such segments have been straightened and in some cases the highway has been relocated.) In 1936 Otto Illauer's view of this stretch of highway won first prize in the photography contest Die schöne Straße in Bau und unter Verkehr (the beautiful road under construction and in use); the only criticism of the picture was that the contrast between the light-colored road and the landscape was too harsh, illustrating the strong desire for harmony between the highway and its surroundings. In fact this entire 125 km (78 mi) segment epitomizes planning to maximize aesthetic appreciation of the landscape. Todt, who was credited with choosing the route, described it as an orchestrated experience culminating in the surprise view of the Chiemsee, where "[a]nyone who has a proper feel for this landscape ... turns off the motor and silently glides down the three-kilometer-long slope to the southern shore of the lake, where a bathing beach, parking places, or the [inn] invite you to stay and rest"; and according to Seifert, of the 13 possibilities for the continuation from the Chiemsee down to the Salzburg plain, the engineers had selected the only one that "[made] the impossible possible" by "continu[ing the sequence of landscape beauty] ... on another level".

Both the hilltop rest stop at the Irschenberg and the rest stop at the Chiemsee were in accordance with general practice on the Reichsautobahn: the highway detoured from the direct route to provide access to cultural sights and views, and rest stops and filling stations were constructed at these points to facilitate leaving the car to appreciate them. For example, at the Annaberg in Silesia (now Góra Świętej Anny, Poland), while the highway was kept a respectful distance away, a parking lot was provided from which motorists could make the ten-minute walk to the mausoleum of the members of the Freikorps who had fallen there in 1921 at the Battle of Annaberg and to the Thingspiel arena below it. Similarly, bridges were to avoid the "inorganic architecture" of the 19th century associated with the Reichsbahn, and were not to obtrude into the motorist's view with high arches, so they were almost unnoticeable from the highway, and therefore viewing platforms were provided so that travelers could stop to see and admire them.

Mitigating damage to the environment was a concern, as part of creating an authentic experience of the landscape, which was to unroll like a movie from the motorist's perspective. The median strip was therefore relatively narrow; trees were retained close to the highway and sometimes, for example in the oak forest near Dessau, in the median. In fact the driver's experience of the forest, assigned symbolic importance in German Romanticism and particularly under the Nazis, was maximized by avoiding straightaways in forested areas so that the driver remained enclosed by the trees as long as possible. To some extent the autobahn landscapers were influenced in this emphasis on the natural environment by the American parkways; Todt had a 1934 USDA bulletin on Roadside Improvement reprinted for his planners' use, and Nazi designers visited Westchester County to study them, about the same time that the Westchester County Parks Commission (WCPC) was partly overseeing the construction of what is today the Taconic State Parkway's southern stretches. But the Reichsautobahn aimed for a more natural, less parklike view from the road, and although in both countries using natively occurring plants in highway landscaping was important, the Americans selectively emphasized those with an attractive appearance. Also, the autobahn was at the time presented, by Todt and others, as an improvement to the natural landscape; Todt refused to avoid the Siebengebirge, a protected conservation area, arguing not only that the area should be opened up for visits but that the road would make it more beautiful. This was not the policy in the U.S., where, most famously, the Blue Ridge Parkway was designed to be narrow and unobtrusive. Cost had the opposite effect with respect to plantings than it did with respect to curves: the Reichsautobahn landscapers had performed pioneering analyses of local ecosystems that led them to plant intensively in order to reconstruct what they determined would have been naturally present at the site, but at the end of 1936, as a result of cost overruns as well as his personal philosophy, Todt severely curtailed plantings, calling for an emphasis on open views.

From the 1950s through the 1970s there was a broad-based movement in West Germany to remove trees from beside the autobahns as a danger, greatly changing their appearance.

All advertising was banned on the Reichsautobahn. Instead of advertising signs, noticeboards to be used to alert drivers to telephone messages were placed on the median near exits. The Reichsautobahn and its innkeeping subsidiary retained all commercial rights in a strip extending 500 m (550 yd) in either direction from the highway; gasoline was bought in bulk and sold by the Reichsautobahn, so that there were no brand names on the filling stations, and station attendants trained at a special school at Michendorf on the Berlin ring road so that they would correctly embody the autobahn. Straßenmeistereien (road governance stations) at roughly 50 to 100 km (31 to 62 mi) intervals maintained the highway and assisted motorists in trouble. These were usually located near settlements, where they provided jobs for 15 to 20 people. The first filling stations were located in the triangle formed by the exit and access lanes, and were of simple, modern design, most of them built to a few standardized designs; the Bauhaus architect Ludwig Mies van der Rohe designed two. Beginning in 1936–37, they were relocated to the side of the road where there was more space, and developed from purely utilitarian service stations into rest stops with overnight accommodation intended to be attractive to the driver. Both the rest stops and the less visible Straßenmeistereien were designed to reflect local architecture, to guard against the danger of the autobahn acting as a homogenizing influence. So, for example, the Chiemsee rest stop took the form of an Alpine chalet. The result has been described as "a kind of völkisch Disney World". Seifert went so far as to write in 1941 that the rest stops should reflect their locations "not only in material and form, but also in their interiors, their dishware, their decorations ... right up to the check and the music". However, the Alpine style tended to predominate.

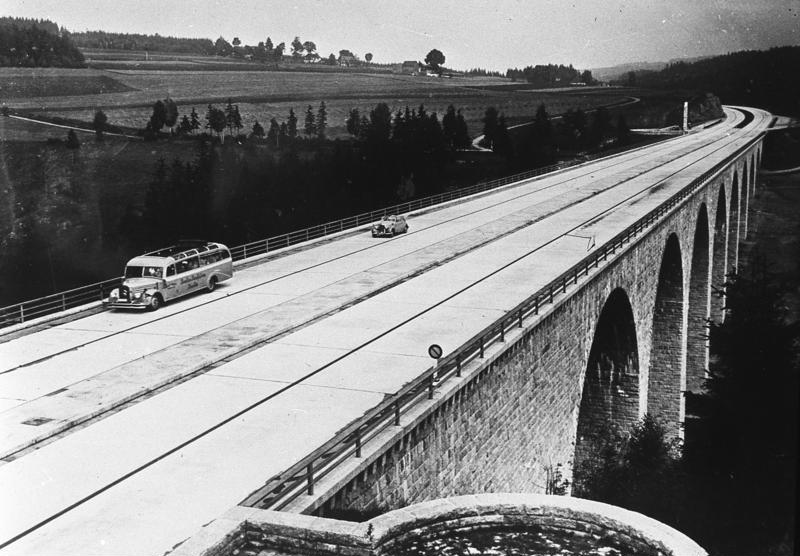
Bridge over the Saale between Hirschberg, Thuringia and Rudolphstein, Upper Franconia, with viewing platform visible in foreground

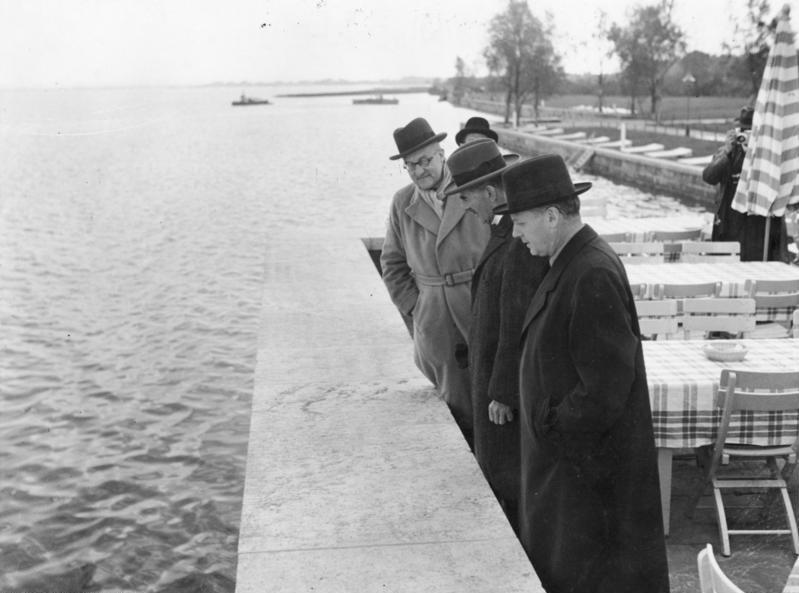
Neville Chamberlain (center, between Herbert von Dirksen and Joachim von Ribbentrop) at the Chiemsee rest stop on September 15, 1938, returning from his meeting with Hitler at the Obersalzberg that led to the Munich Agreement

Motorway exit signpost (traced). The hand-painted panels made of wood and plywood had the basic color of blue shade RAL 32 h. This corresponds to today's RAL 5002.

=== Monumental function ===
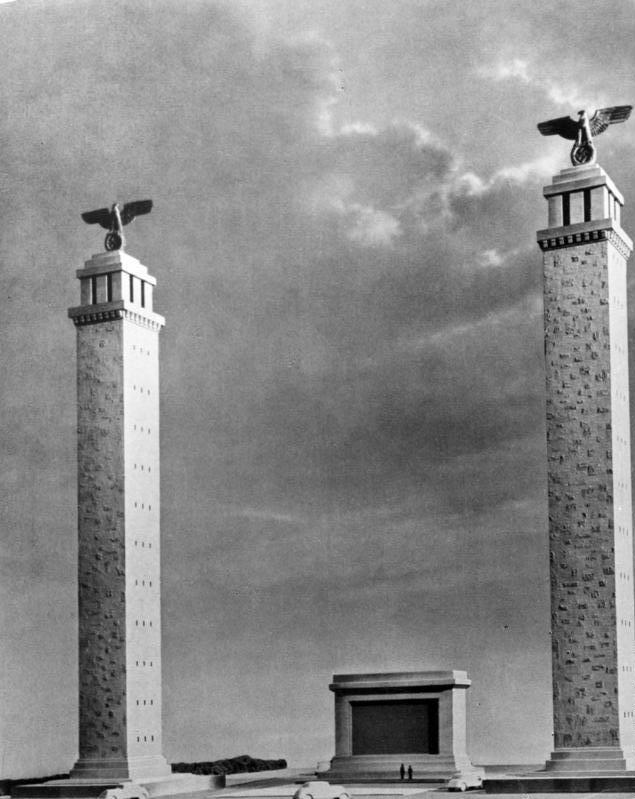
Model of autobahn gateway designed by Albert Speer for the Austrian frontier near Salzburg (1936)

==== Autobahn propaganda ====
Probably most importantly, the autobahns were created as a monument to the Third Reich, both internally and internationally; in the words of historian Thomas Zeller, "to symbolize power and the conquest of space". Todt insisted that they always be referred to as the Reichsautobahns, never simply "autobahns", and sought to eliminate use of the rival term Kraftfahrbahn (motor route).

They were frequently classed as a wonder of the modern world and especially compared to the Egyptian pyramids. For example, Emil Maier-Dorn wrote: "The Reichsautobahn must become, like the Great Wall of China, like the Acropolis of the Athenians, [and] like the pyramids of Egypt, a tower[ing presence] on the landscape of history, [it] must stand like a duke in the parade of human achievements."

One aspect of this was the sheer size of the project, which was constantly presented to the public not only by ceremonies starting work on and opening segments, but by radio broadcasts (including at least two dramas as well as informational broadcasts and coverage of ceremonies), posters, postcards, stamp issues, calendars, board games, etc., and a major exhibition, Die Straße (The Road), which opened in Munich in 1934 and in which the autobahns were presented in artworks as the culmination of the history of human roadbuilding. This exhibition was subsequently shown in Berlin and Breslau, and other exhibitions occurred later in, for example, Prague (1940) and Budapest (1942).

The Reichsautobahn was also prominently represented in the 1937 exhibition celebrating the first four years of the regime's achievements, Gebt mir vier Jahre Zeit (Give Me Four Years, a slogan of Hitler's). In addition, Todt commissioned official artists, particularly Ernst Vollbehr, and photographers, particularly Erna Lendvai-Dircksen, to depict the construction of the autobahns in heroic terms.

Full-length movies called Fahrzeuge und Straßen im Wandel der Zeiten (Vehicles and Roads Throughout Time; scripted in 1934) and Die große Straße (The Great Road; to have been directed by Robert A. Stemmle) were never made; however, work on the autobahns is the setting of Stemmle's 1939 Mann für Mann (Man for Man), Harald Paulsen's Stimme aus dem Äther from earlier in the same year includes chase scenes on the autobahn, and some 50 short films were made about the project, including both technical films such as Vom Wald zur Straßendecke (From the Forest to the Road Surface, 1937) and shorts for popular consumption such as Bahn Frei! (Open Road) and UFA's Vierhundert bauen eine Brücke (Four Hundred Build a Bridge, 1937). These last were Kulturfilme (cultural films), which were shown at Party and club meetings and together with the Wochenschau (newsreel) formed part of theater programs. The autobahns also gave rise to several novels and a considerable amount of poetry.

==== Bridges, the autobahn's monuments ====
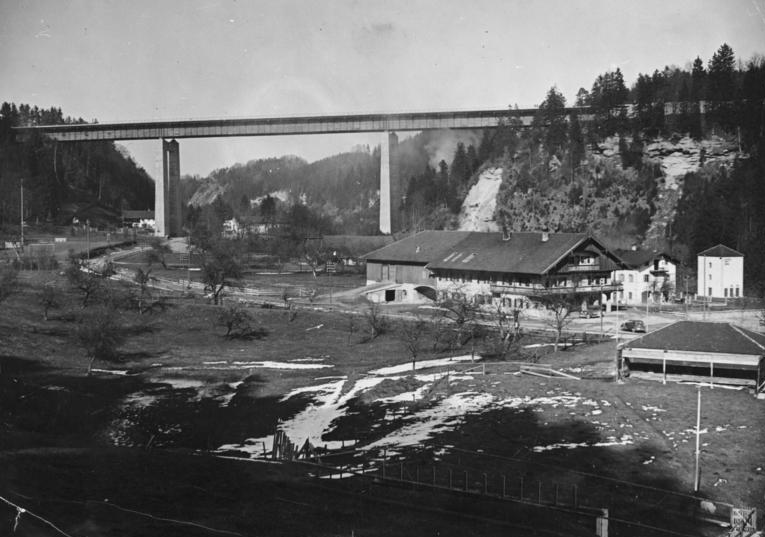
Mangfall Bridge in 1936, the year it opened

As Ernst Bloch wrote in 1937, the autobahns, despite their magnitude, were "rather flat". Photomontages attempted to impress upon the public the sheer volume of earth moved and materials used to build them, but the primary means of demonstrating the monumentality of the achievement were bridges and sculpture.

Because it had no intersections, the autobahn required a huge number of bridges and underpasses. These were initially purely utilitarian in design, but after inspecting the first completed stretch, Todt sought to give them a more unified and aesthetic appearance. Paul Bonatz, who was hired in 1934 to oversee bridge design on the Reichsautobahn, wrote a few months before that they should be as unnoticeable as possible, minimal in mass and in obstruction of view. Like the rest stops, they were also designed to reflect local building styles and materials. One exception that proved the rule was the bare steel bridges spanning the Dessauer Rennstrecke high-speed section, which expressed its high-tech purpose and also alluded to the Junkers aircraft company that was headquartered in Dessau.

The relatively few large bridges were major design statements; Todt wrote in 1937 that they "should not be [designed] for 1940, nor yet for 2000, but ... should extend their dominating presence, like the cathedrals of our past, into future millennia." The first of these was the Mangfall Bridge at Weyarn, a girder bridge designed by German Bestelmeyer that spanned the valley on two double pylons of reinforced concrete. Built in 1934–36, this served as the model for several subsequent autobahn bridges, and a model of one of the huge pylons dominated the Reichsautobahn exhibit at the Gebt mir vier Jahre Zeit exhibition.

Subsequently, the preferred style for the large bridges evolved away from this modern form toward viaducts derived from Roman bridges, which had a more imposing mass, allowed the reflection of regional building styles in their use of stone and brick, and embodied the Nazi claim to be the heirs to the great builders of ancient times. These included the Holledau Bridge by Georg Gsaenger (1937–38) and the bridges over the Saale at Hirschberg, Thuringia, and Jena; in 1938 Friedrich Tamms designed a huge imitation Roman viaduct for the Werra valley at Hedemünden. Another factor in this change in style was the shortage of steel caused by the policy of autarky and by rearmament and war; there was also a near failure of a continuously welded bridge, which had to be quietly reinforced and led to mistrust of steel construction. Many later bridges had a reinforced concrete core clad in stonework or brick.

However, with the bridges the shift was never as complete as it was in other aspects of Reichsautobahn architecture: in 1940–41, along the Rhine, a stone bridge was under construction at Frankenthal and at the same time at Rodenkirchen in Cologne, an ultra-modern suspension bridge by Bonatz. In addition to the self-image of modernity, another reason for this was the enormous cost of stone construction in man-hours and in material; so much masonry construction was carried out in the Third Reich that shortages occurred. Hence many of the viaducts were in simplified, modernized form, for example the series at the Drackensteiner Hang by Paul Bonatz and the bridge over the Lahn valley at Limburg, by Bonatz and Gottwalt Schaper.

==== Sculptures ====
In addition, the Reichsautobahn was to have had a large amount of monumental sculpture. The viewing platforms from which travelers could admire the bridges often had obelisks or columns topped with eagles and swastikas. In addition to the large signs on the bridges immediately before the exit to a city—often including the heraldic animal or complete coat of arms—imposing sculptures were planned for many such exits, usually involving eagles towering above the road, as in Bestelmeyer's sketch for the entrance to Heidelberg and Speer's 1936 design for a dramatic gateway at the border near Salzburg.

Bridges sometimes constituted dramatic gateways in themselves, such as the "Gateway of Thuringia" at Eisenberg, by Hermann Rukwied, and sometimes included sculpture, such as the 1937 bas relief 7.5 m (25 ft) high by Kurt Lehmann depicting a "worker of the fist" and a "worker of the brow" on the Hedemünden bridge. Josef Thorak executed and exhibited in 1938–39 the model for a gigantic monument to Reichsautobahn workers, 17 m (56 ft) high, consisting of three naked workers straining to move a boulder up a slope in a manner recalling Sisyphus; this was to have been placed in the median on the site of the sod-breaking for the extension of the highway into Austria.

== Unfinished routes ==
Route 24 Hamburg - Hanover. This route was based on the planning of the HaFraBa association. However, the route between Hamburg and Hanover was not continued after the war as planned between Schwarmstedt and Buchholz, eastwards past Negenborn in a south-south-westerly direction to today's Bundesautobahn A2 near Garbsen, but instead was routed eastwards past Hanover as Bundesautobahn 7 .

Route 46 Fulda - Würzburg. After the Second World War, a different route was chosen. There are almost a dozen unfinished structures on the old route, most of them in the forest. In Rupboden, a district road crosses under the overgrown route, which is still clearly visible today. Near Gräfendorf, an unfinished pillar now serves as a climbing rock for alpinists. Although protected as a monument, apart from signs against damage to property, even today there is no memorial plaque commemorating the Reichsautobahn route, which ended as a ruin and was completely suppressed for many years.

Route 145. During the German occupation of Denmark, earthworks for a Reichsautobahn "Route 145" were started from the ferry port of Rødbyhavn to Majbølle on the Guldborgsund in September 1941. Some crossing bridges are still in use today. In the 1950s, this motorway was completed and has been part of the European Route 47 (Europastraße 47, Vogelfluglinie) since 1963.

== Influence ==
Foreign visitors reported very favorably on the autobahns, particularly the foreign press in Germany for the 1936 Olympics; in October 1937 it was noted that an English visitor had remarked on the "real democracy" at an autobahn work site, and in September 1936 the former British Prime Minister David Lloyd George visited Hitler partly to discuss the autobahns, and returned home calling him a "great man". But they were also regarded as inhumane. Frederick Law Olmsted Jr. described their version of the parkway design as "a horrid clash of nature and technics." In his critical book on Nazi Germany, The House That Hitler Built, historian Stephen Henry Roberts described them as "needlessly grandiose but most impressive. Efficiently made and more efficiently managed, they somehow reduce the individual to insignificance." Walter Dirks may also have intended veiled criticism when he wrote in the Frankfurter Zeitung in 1938 of autobahn driving as overwhelmingly passive: "It is a mark of how passive we are, of how much the sweep of road affects our senses, that the relationship between driver and road seems to be reversed. The road takes the active role, moving toward us quickly and smoothly, ... sucking the car inexorably into itself."

After the war, with the exception of the parkway aesthetic, the Reichsautobahn became the model for highways in other countries, and the practical experience gained—in logistics, mechanized construction, and bridge-building—was also used by others.

Dwight D. Eisenhower realized the benefits of the Reichsautobahn during his time as an officer in the US Army, and as president, used those ideas to bring about the Interstate Highway System in the U.S. through the Federal Aid Highway Act of 1956.

== See also ==
- Borovsko Bridge near Prague, meant to be part of a Reichsautobahn to Prague

== Further information ==
=== Print ===
- Ernst Vollbehr. Arbeitsschlacht: fünf Jahre Malfahrten auf den Bauplätzen der "Strassen Adolf Hitlers". Berlin: Zeitgeschichte, 1938. OCLC 3931593 (in German)
- Max K. Schwarz. "Tankstellen, Straßenmeistereien und Raststätten—Betriebsorganismen an der Reichsautobahn". Die Straße 6 (1939) 660– . (in German)
- Kurt Kaftan. Der Kampf um die Autobahnen. Geschichte und Entwicklung des Autobahngedankens in Deutschland von 1907–1935 unter Berücksichtigung ähnlicher Pläne und Bestrebungen im übrigen Europa. Berlin: Wigankow, 1955. OCLC 19828379 (in German)
- Karl Lärmer. Autobahnbau in Deutschland 1933 bis 1945: zu den Hintergründen. Forschungen zur Wirtschaftsgeschichte 6. Berlin: Akademie, 1975. OCLC 2492185 (in German)
- Hansjoachim Henning. "Kraftfahrzeugindustrie und Autobahnbau in der Wirtschaftspolitik des Nationalsozialismus 1933–1936". Vierteljahrschrift für Sozial- und Wirtschaftsgeschichte 65 (1978) 217–42 (in German)
- Richard J. Overy. "Cars, Roads, and Economic Recovery in Germany, 1932–1938". In: War and Economy in the Third Reich. Oxford: Clarendon / New York: Oxford University, 1994. ISBN 9780198202905. pp. 68–89
- Erhard Schütz. "'Verankert fest im Kern des Bluts': Die Reichsautobahn—mediale Visionen einer organischen Moderne im 'Dritten Reich'". In: Faszination des Organischen: Konjunkturen einer Kategorie der Moderne. Ed. Hartmut Eggert, Erhard Schütz, and Peter Sprengel. Munich: Iudicium, 1995. ISBN 9783891292280. pp. 231–66. Slightly modified as "Faszination der blaßgrauen Bänder. Zur 'organischen' Technik der Reichsautobahn". In: Der Technikdiskurs der Hitler-Stalin-Ära. Ed. Wolfgang Emmerich and Carl Wege. Stuttgart: Metzler, 1995. ISBN 9783476013071. pp. 123–45 (in German)
- Arend Vosselman. Reichsautobahn: Schönheit, Natur, Technik. Kiel: Arndt, 2001. ISBN 9783887410445 (in German)
- Benjamin Steininger. Raum-Maschine Reichsautobahn: zur Dynamik eines bekannt/unbekannten Bauwerks. Kaleidogramme 2. Berlin: Kulturverlag Kadmos, 2005. ISBN 9783865990020 (in German)

=== Film ===
- Hartmut Bitomsky. Reichsautobahn. Germany, 1985. 92 mins. OCLC 312133763. (in German) Subtitled in English, Highways to the Third Reich. Big Sky Film. OCLC 48078430
- Hermann G. Abmayr. Mythos Autobahn. Tatsachen und Legenden. Germany, Süddeutscher Rundfunk 1998. 43 mins. OCLC 312979930. (in German)
