= German Bestelmeyer =

German architect (1874–1942)

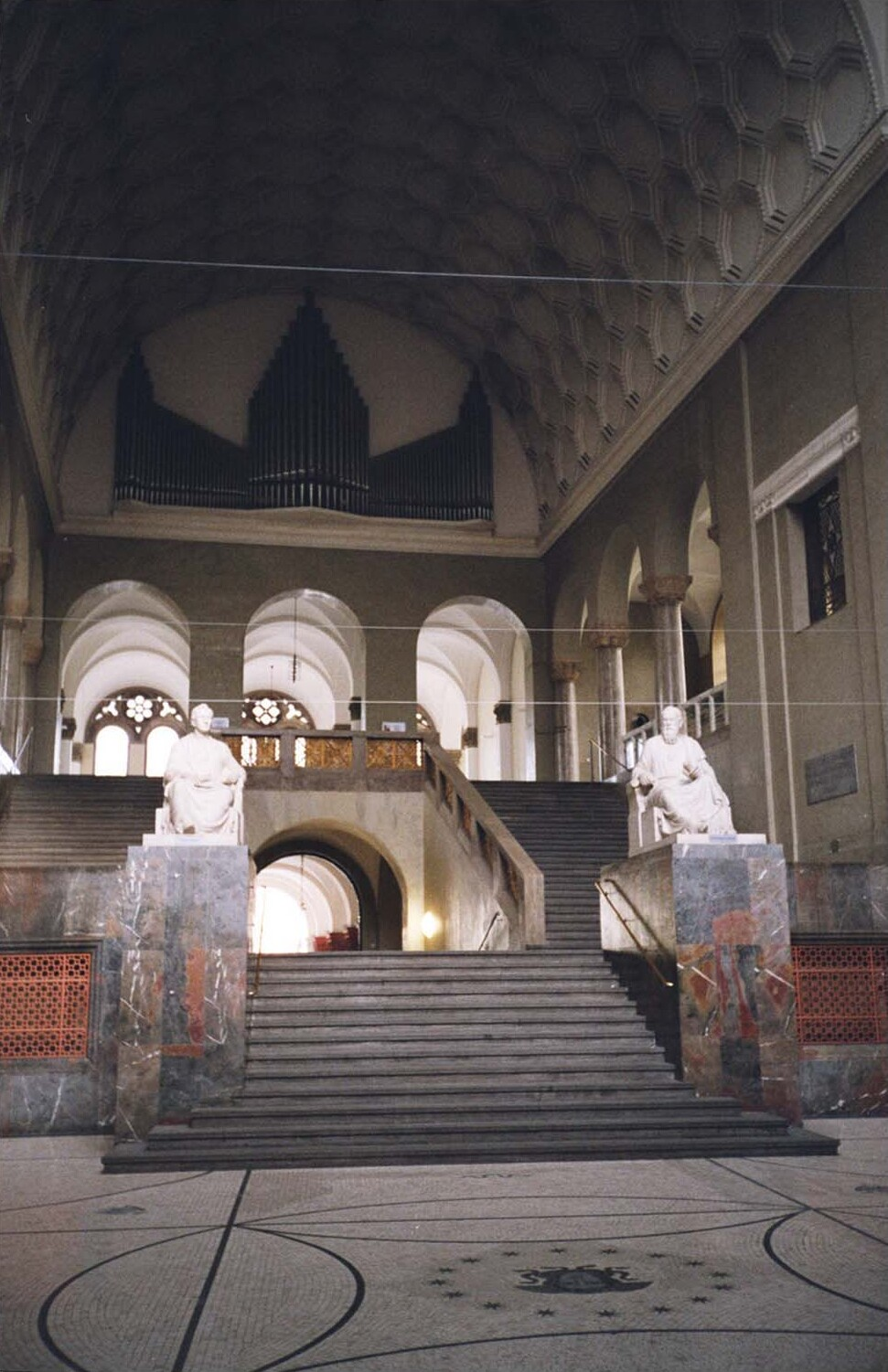
Light court and main stairs, LMU Munich (built 1906–09)

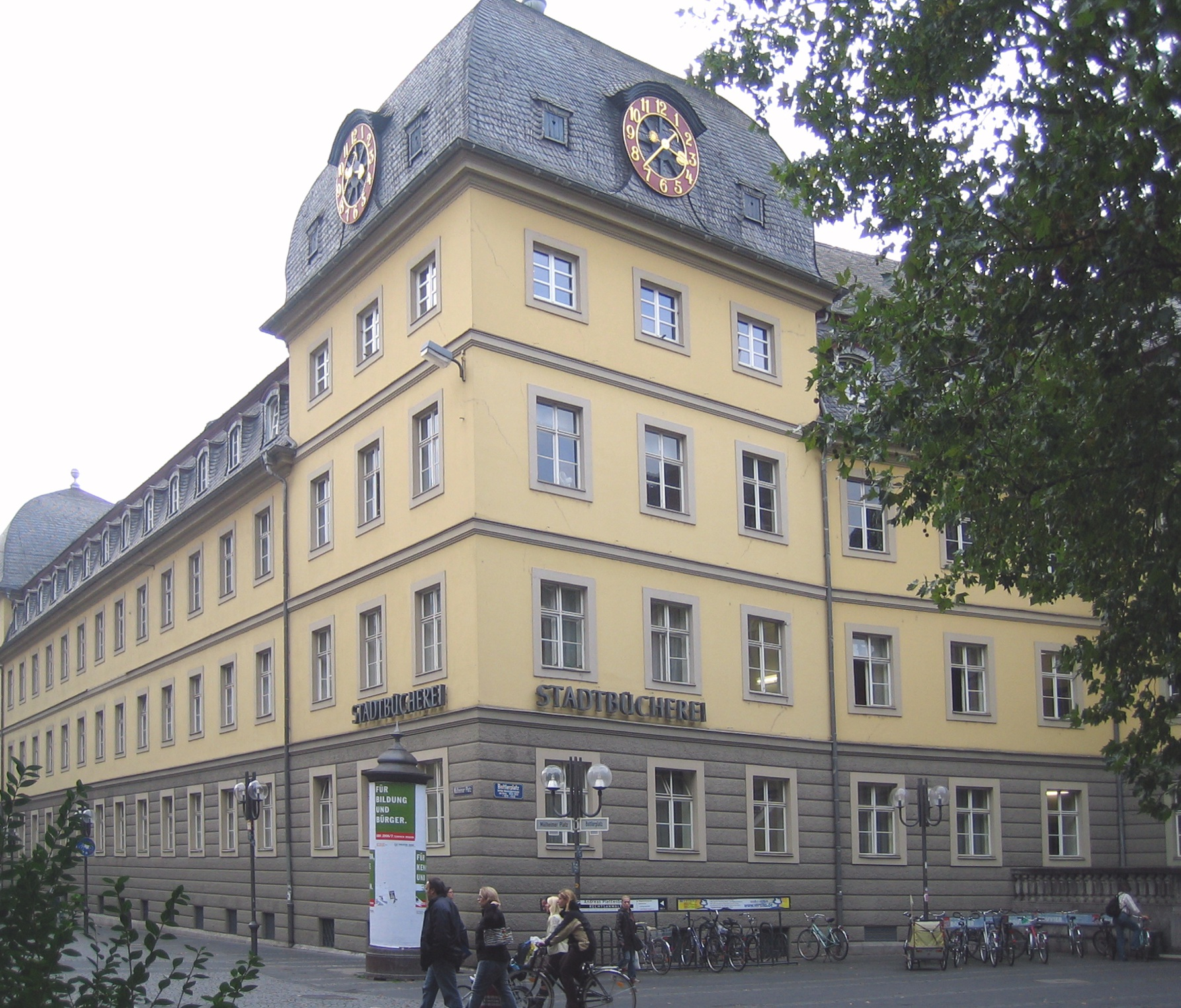
Altes Stadthaus in Bonn (built 1922)

German Bestelmeyer (8 June 1874 – 30 June 1942) was a German architect, university lecturer, and proponent of Nazi architecture. Most of his work was in South Germany.

== Education ==
Bestelmeyer was born in Nuremberg, the son of a military doctor. He studied architecture from 1893 to 1897 at the Technical University of Munich under Friedrich von Thiersch and at the Academy of Fine Arts Vienna under Friedrich von Schmidt.

== Early career ==
Bestelmeyer worked as a building inspector and planner in Nuremberg, Regensburg, and at the Ludwig-Maximilians-Universität München, where he designed an extension to the main building that was built between 1906 and 1910.

== Professorships ==
In 1910, he was appointed to a professorship at Technische Universität Dresden. The following year he transferred to the Dresden Academy of Fine Arts, and in 1915 to the Berlin University of the Arts. In 1919, he also became a professor at Technische Universität Berlin. In 1922, he returned to Munich as a professor at the Technical University of Munich, and from 1934 until his death in 1942 he was President of the Academy of Fine Arts, Munich.

== Style and influence ==
Bestelmeyer was an outspoken advocate of traditionalist völkisch architecture. He was a member of the Munich School to which Paul Troost also belonged. In 1928, with Paul Schultze-Naumburg, Paul Schmitthenner and others, he founded "The Block", a group of architects in opposition to the modernist group Der Ring.

Bestelmeyer was singled out for praise in 1931 by Schultze-Naumburg and in 1934, shortly after Adolf Hitler's rise to power, wrote an article in which he endorsed Alexander von Senger's criticism of Le Corbusier, described 1920s architecture as having become "soulless", and rejected flat roofs as unsuited to the climate in Germany. He was a member of both the Deutscher Werkbund and the antisemitic Militant League for German Culture. He became a Reich Cultural Senator in 1935.

== Nazi architecture ==
Bestelmeyer brought von Senger to the Bavarian Academy and designed buildings such as the Luftwaffe office building on the Prinzregentenstraße in Munich, which were much praised at the time. However, he also designed a number of mostly Protestant churches, some of which met with official approval, and Hitler chose his design for the Mangfall Bridge, a girder bridge on two massive concrete pylons carrying one of the new Reichsautobahns, which was influential in its simple modernity and size.

== Funeral ==
Bestelmeyer died in 1942 at the resort of Bad Wiessee. On Hitler's orders, his body was brought back to Munich and after lying in state in the Academy of Fine Arts, transferred for the state funeral to the light-court of the Ludwig-Maximilians-Universität München which he had designed, with 300 members of the Hitler Youth in attendance.

== Selected works ==
- Extension to Main Building of the Ludwig-Maximilians-Universität München (1906–09)
- Adolphus Busch Hall at Harvard University, then the Germanic Museum (1910)
- Schlosshotel im Grunewald in Berlin-Grunewald (1911–14), built as a villa for Walter von Pannwitz
- Renovation and extension of Germanisches Nationalmuseum in Nuremberg (1914–19)
- Administration building, Life Insurance Bank "Arminia" in Munich (1914–16)
- Altes Stadthaus in Bonn (1922)
- Reichsschuldenverwaltung Building in Berlin (1921–23)
- Extension Building of Technical University of Munich (1923–26)
- Kroch High-rise on Augustusplatz in Leipzig (1927/28)
- Protestant Christuskirche (Church of Christ) in Neuburg an der Donau (1927–30)
- Protestant Auferstehungskirche (Church of the Resurrection) in Munich-Westend (1930–31)
- Research Building and Congress Center of the Deutsches Museum in Munich (1928–35)
- Mangfall Bridge near Weyarn (1934–36)
- Luftwaffe Gau Command on Prinzregentenstraße in Munich (1935–36; now Bavarian Ministry of Economics)
- Protestant Stephanuskirche (St. Stephen's Church) in Munich Neuhausen-Nymphenburg (1936–38)
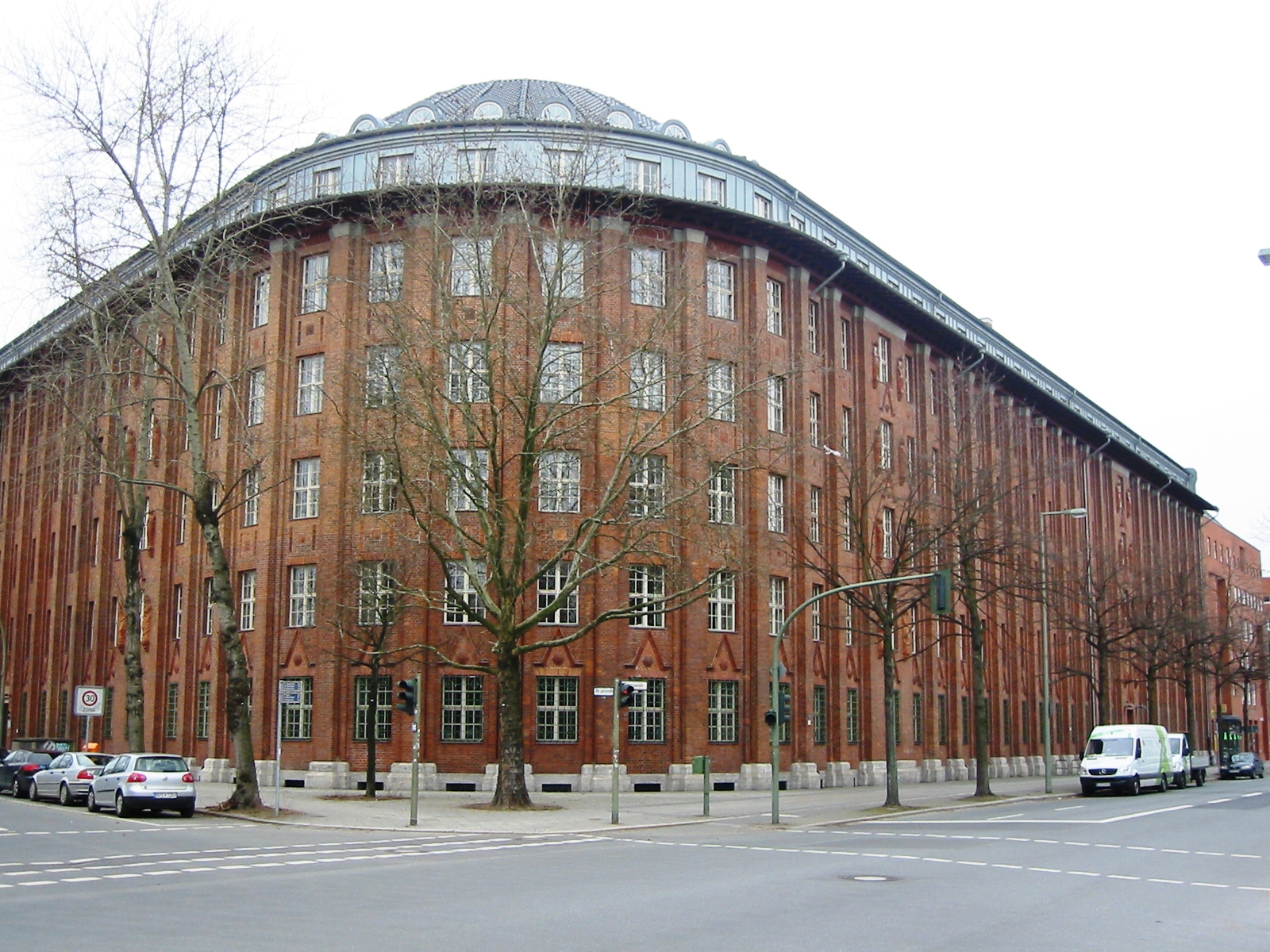
Reichsschuldenverwaltung building, Berlin (1921–23)

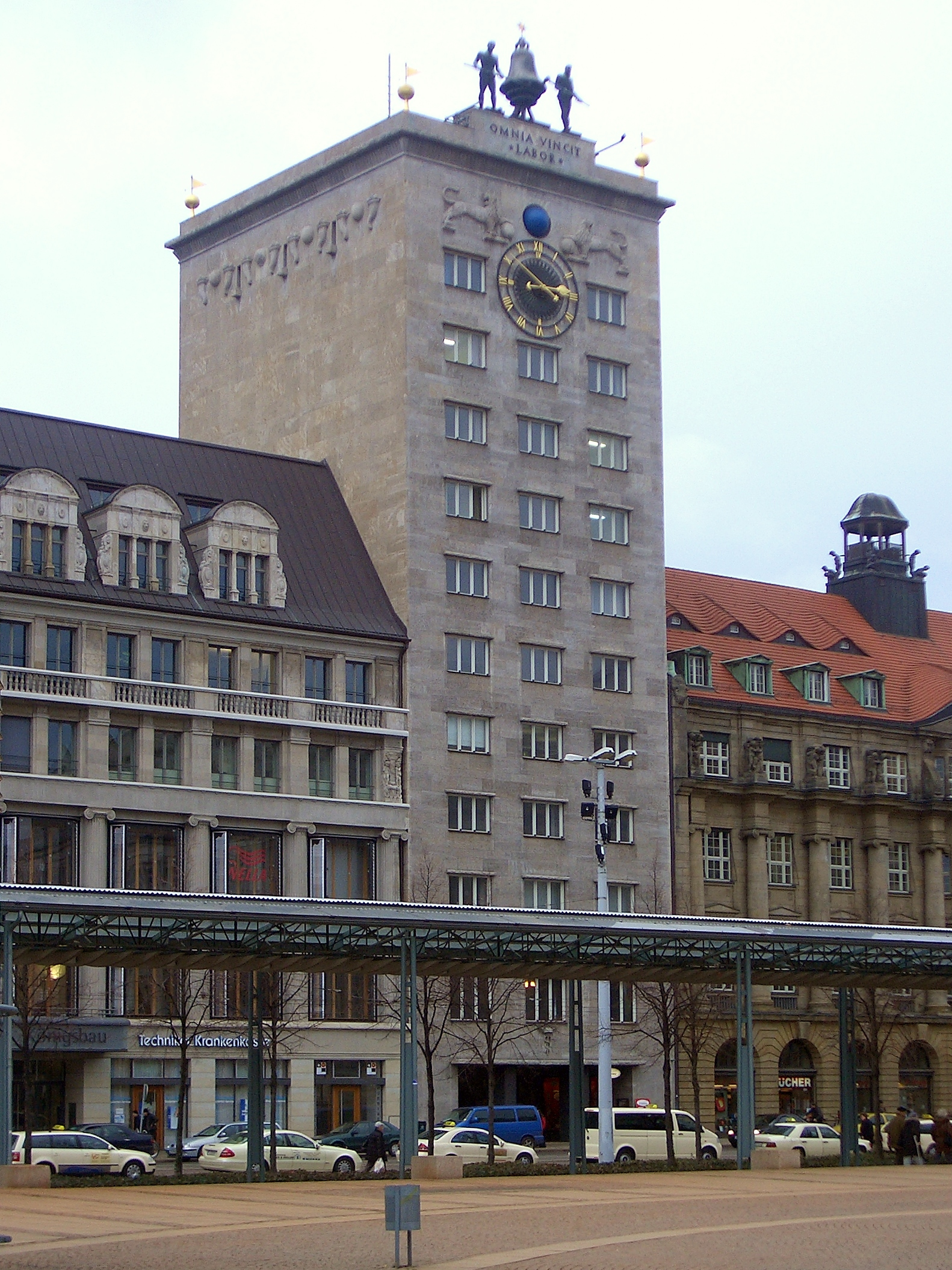
Kroch Building, Leipzig (1927/28)

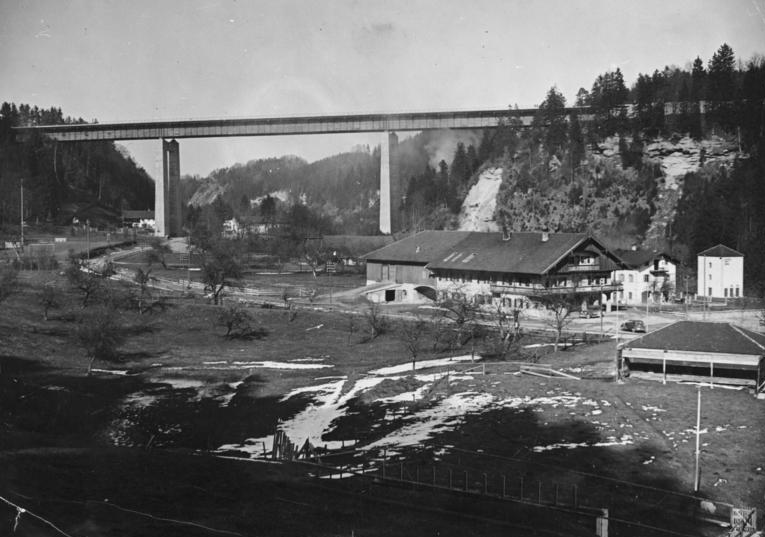
Mangfall Bridge (1934–36), pictured in 1936

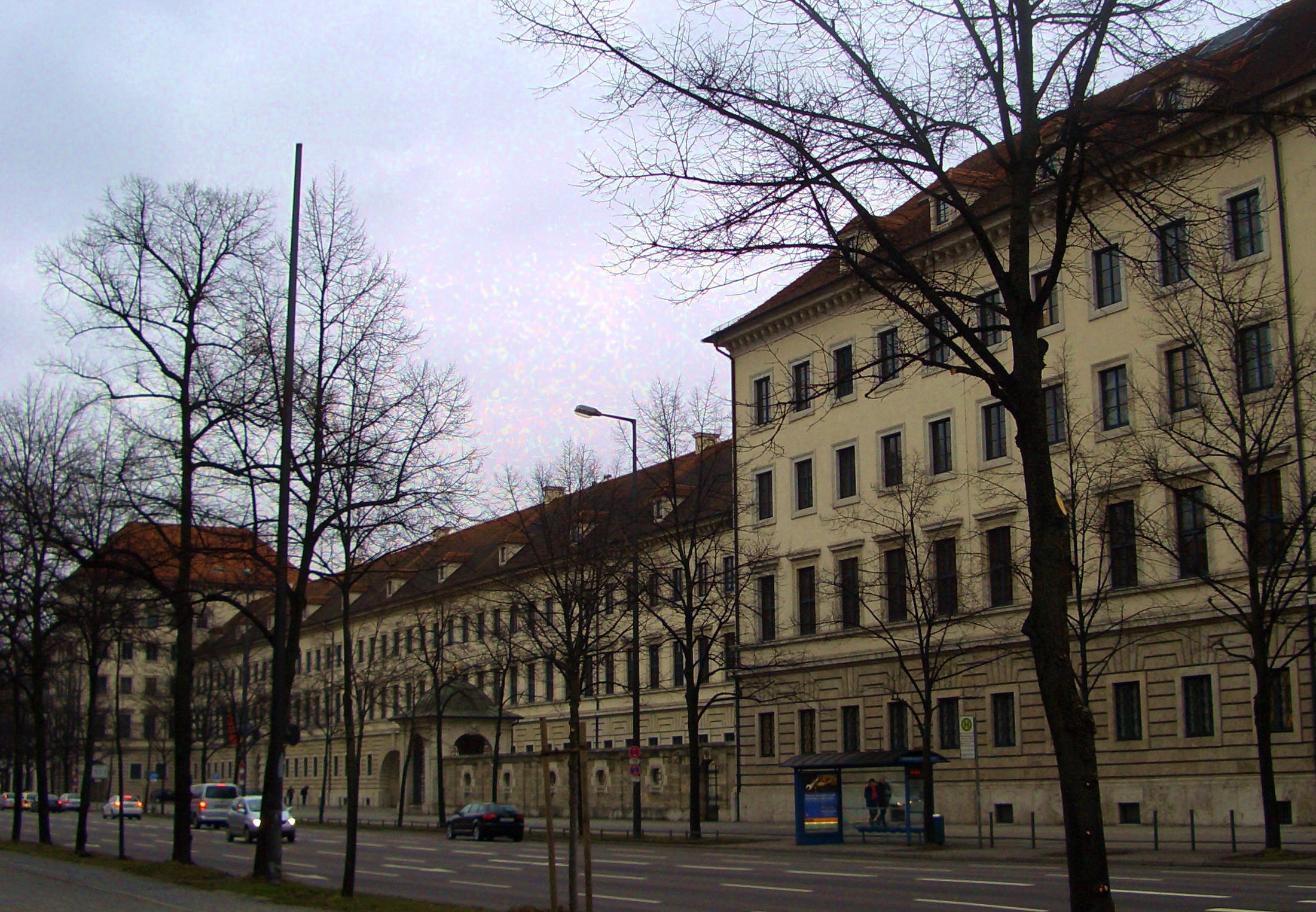
Luftwaffe Gau Command, Munich (1935–36)

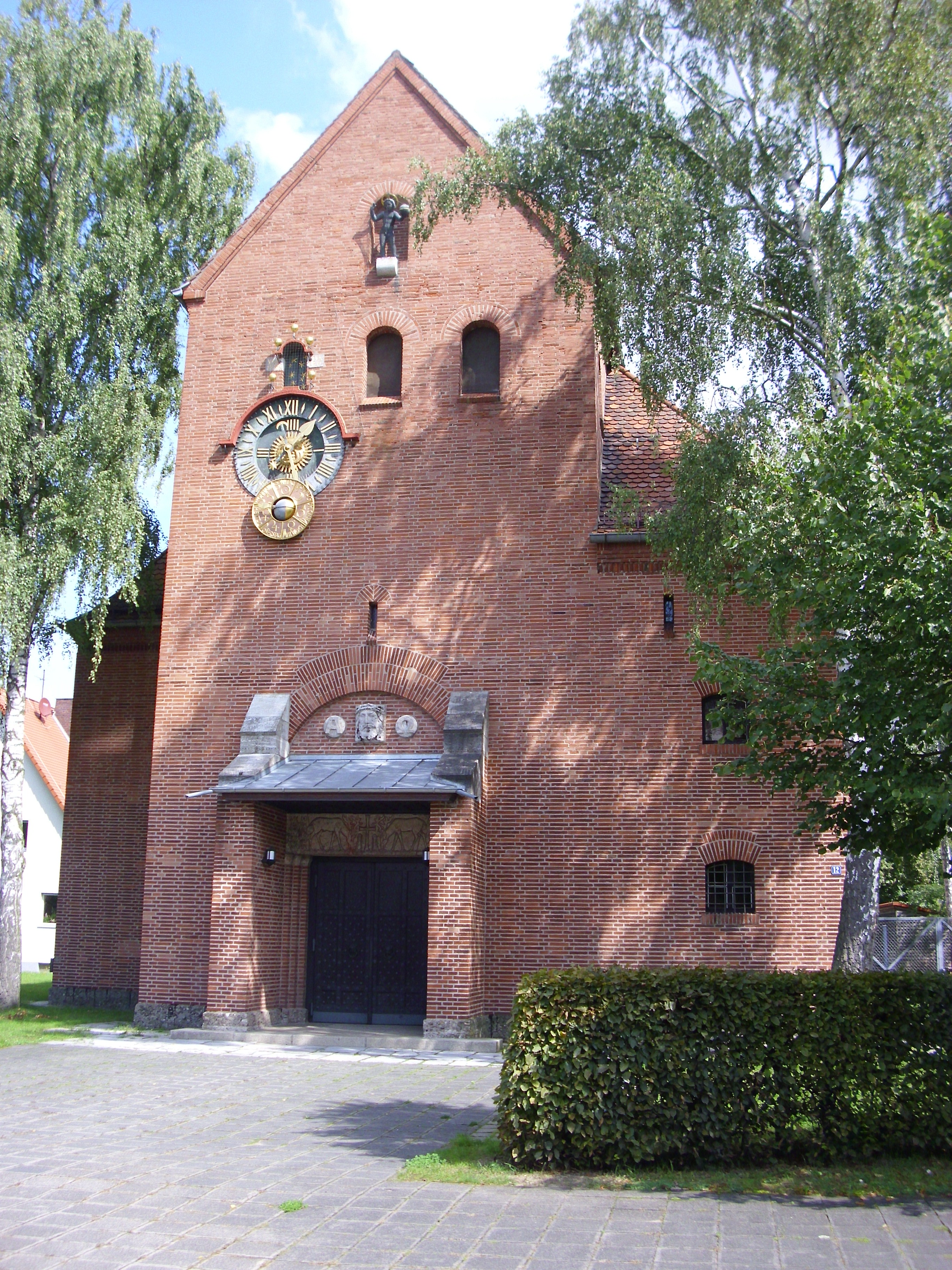
Melancthon Church, Nuremberg
(1938–40)

== See also ==
- List of tallest buildings in Leipzig
