= Wommen Viaduct =

Road bridge in Germany

Coordinates: 51°01′00″N 10°07′04″E

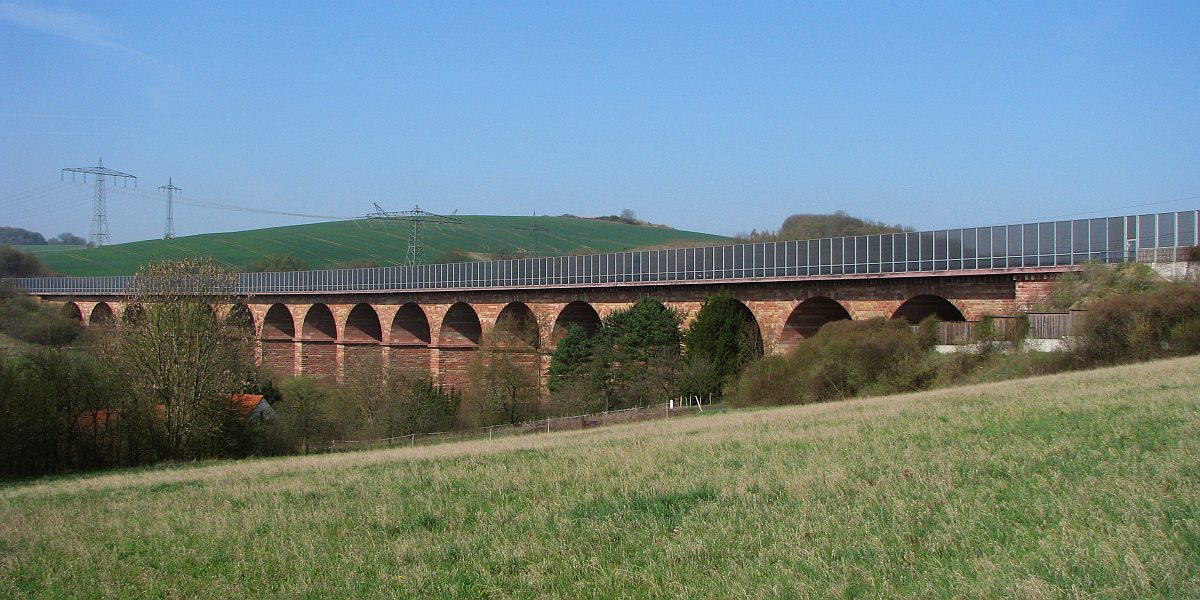
Wommen Viaduct in 2009

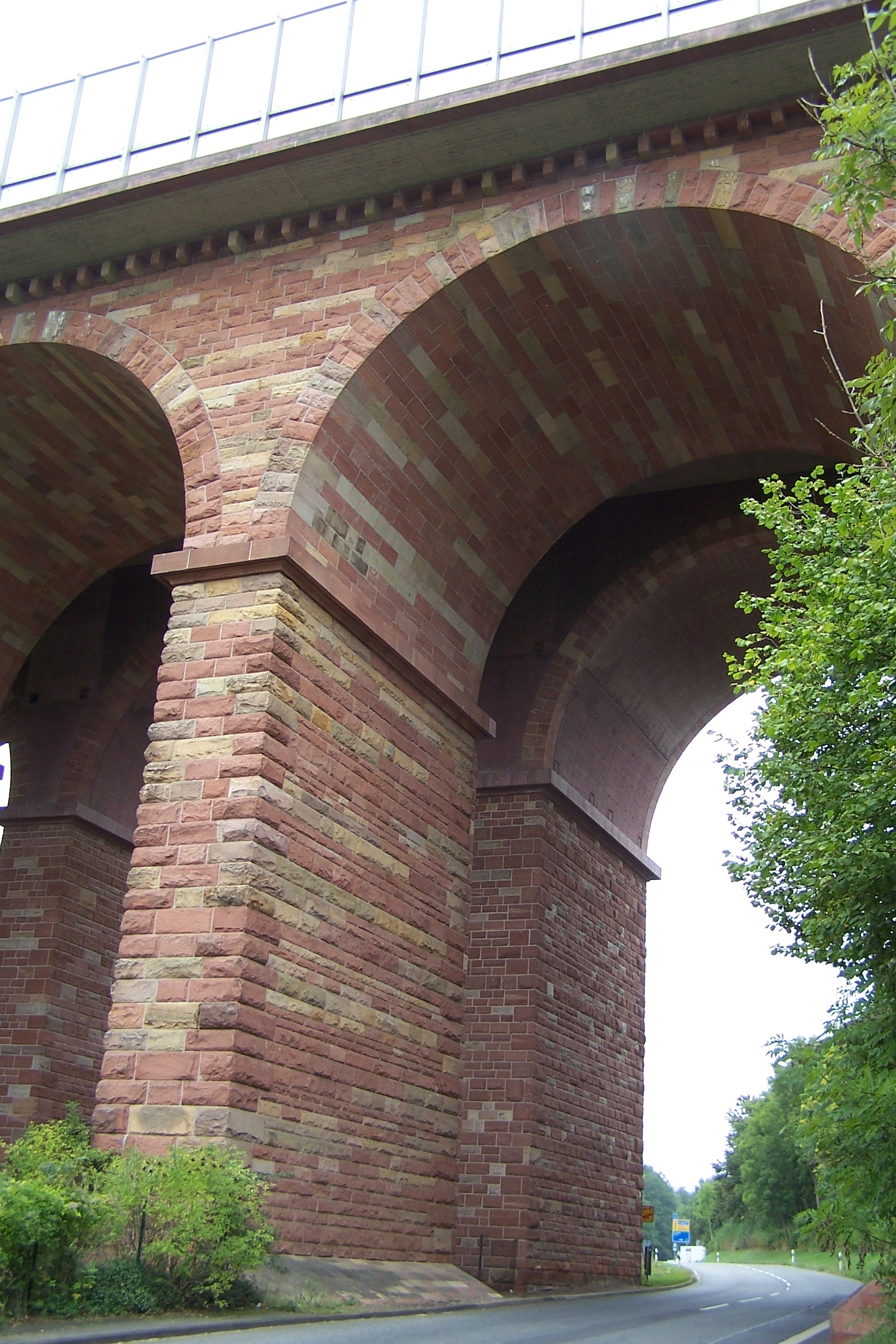
View of the arches, foreground old and background new arches

The Wommen Viaduct is an arch bridge built between 1938 and 1940 near Wommen, Germany, as part of the Reichsautobahn system. It is a 26.5 metres (87 ft) tall and 303.8 metres (997 ft) long motorway bridge on the Bundesautobahn 4. Because of World War II, it was left half-finished, and because of the German division the one completed side was closed until 1990. After German reunification, it was completed in 1993 with a new bridge for the second lane.
