= Altes Stadthaus, Bonn =

German administration building in Bonn

Altes Stadthaus
- Altes Stadthaus
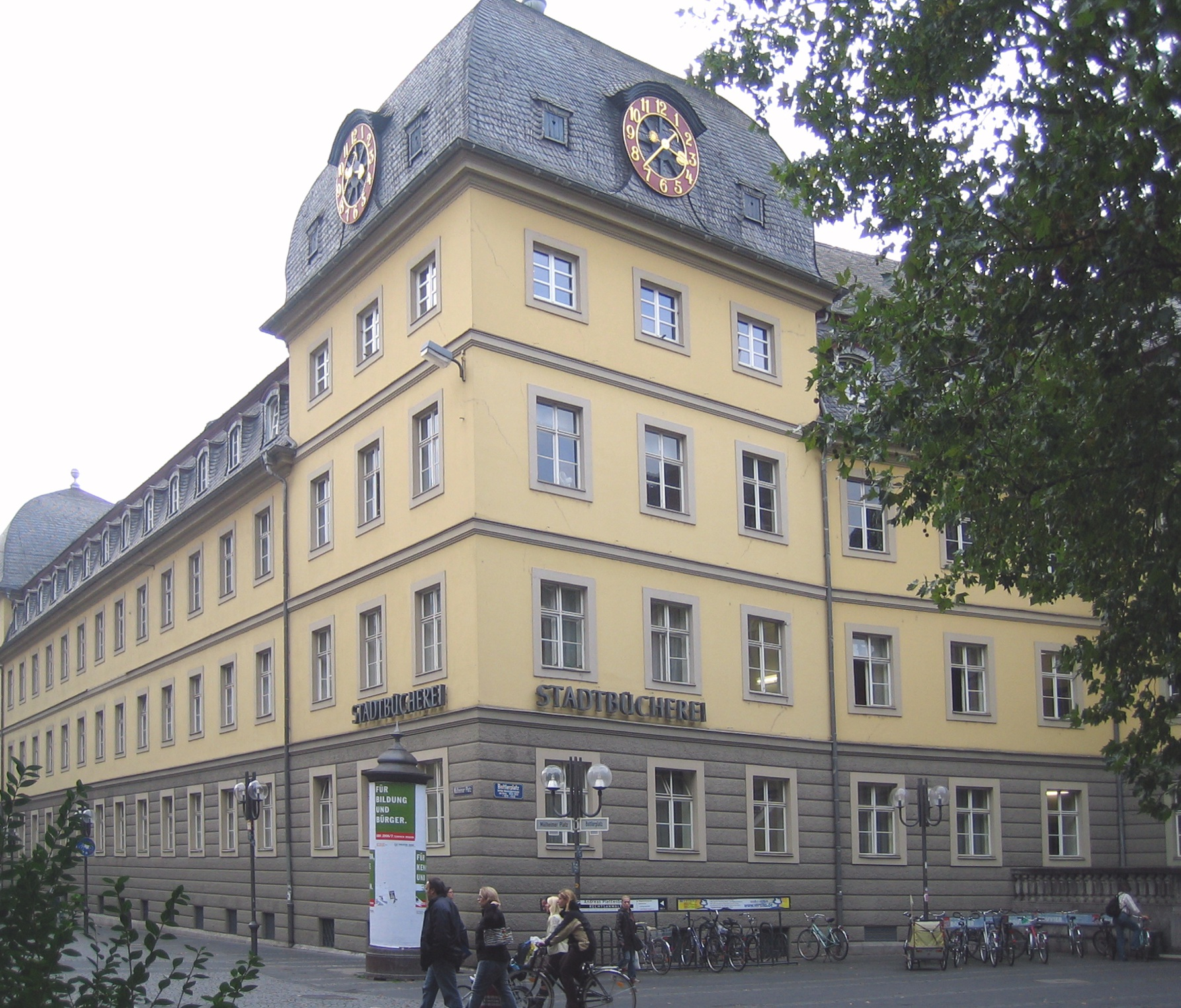
- Altes Stadthaus
- Interactive map of the Altes Stadthaus area

General information
- Type: Municipal administration
- Location: Bonn, Germany
- Coordinates: 50°44′03.47″N 7°5′50.61″E
- Construction started: 1920
- Completed: 1924–25
- Client: French occupation forces

Design and construction
- Architect: German Bestelmeyer

References
- Andreas Denk and Ingebork Flagge, 1997; Andrew Gumbel, 1991

The Altes Stadthaus ("Old City Hall") is a former administration building in Bonn, Germany, built for the French occupation forces after World War I. It was designed by the Munich architect German Bestelmeyer in 1922. Construction was completed in 1924–25. The building most recently served as a public library and administration building. The Altes Stadthaus was re-opened as a "House of Learning" (German: "Haus der Bildung"), housing a branch of the Bonn city library, a community college, Literaturhaus Bonn, and a café.

== Location and architecture ==
German Bestelmeyer designed the building to make an impressive entry point to the city on the north side. It was erected on a bastion that remained from the former city walls, opposite the University of Bonn, which occupies the former residential palace of the prince-elector of Cologne on the site of the south bastion. A curved section adjoins Windeckstraße on the south side and defines the remaining bastion as a garden space. Along with the "Old Toll-House", this bastion is one of the few parts of the old fortifications accessible to the public. In the 1980s, a new access route was created from the Florentiusgraben, and the courtyard was landscaped and trees planted. In the late 1990s part of this small park was turned into a playground.

The Altes Stadthaus is arranged around two rectangular internal courtyards. The main section, which faces Mülheimer Platz, has a mansard roof and is framed by four-storey turrets. The main entrance is at the southwest corner of Bottlerplatz, and the building bridges Windeckstraße, with two low arched openings. Bestelmayer's building was intended to be the nucleus of future development in the centre of Bonn. However, the only other construction there was the tax office on the corner of Mülheimer Platz and Münsterstraße, built in 1937, and some further building on Bottlerplatz. After the Neues Stadthaus—the new city administration building—was built, the main floor of the section of Altes Stadthaus facing Mülheimer Platz was rebuilt to house the library. In the course of this restructuring, the two courtyards were roofed over and several interior walls replaced with columns. The east wing of the building was demolished to make way for a C&A department store.

== History ==
After World War II, the Bundesministerium für gesamtdeutsche Fragen was housed in the Altes Stadthaus between 1949 and 1957, primarily in the now demolished section of the building.

In the summer of 2006, the mayor and the speaker of the Social Democratic Party of Germany group in the city council announced plans to sell the Altes Stadthaus, relocating the library, the community college, and the city museum to a new building in Quantiusstraße, near the station. The Stadthaus was to be used as retail space.

=== House of Learning ===
The announcement to sell the building sparked a fierce public debate. The Green Party, at the time in a coalition with the SPD, strongly disagreed with the plan. The Christian Democratic Union party held a meeting in October 2006. The director of the Bonn Women's Museum, Marianne Pitzen, accused the initiators of the plan of selling off public property and underestimating the value of cultural heritage.

At the end of October 2006, a citizens' group was formed to promote the creation of a "House of Learning" (German: "Haus der Bildung") at Bottlerplatz. The group demanded that the existing building and library should be kept and renovated.

At its session of 23 November 2006, the planning committee of the city council charged its staff with examining how the Altes Stadthaus could be used for large-scale retail without damaging it as an architectural landmark. The report, which was presented at the end of December, recommended reuse of the already modified internal space housing the library, and creation of additional usable space up to a total of approximately 1600 m². This could be done by lowering the floor to street level and modifying stairway areas without changing the external appearance of the building, which is characteristic of government buildings of the 1920s, particularly in its blocky ground floor. Changes to the upper floors, which remained largely in their original condition, were not recommended.

On 21 January 2007, the SPD and CDU city councillors announced that they had agreed to house the "Haus der Bildung" in the Altes Stadthaus. The building will be extended to accommodate it. On 31 January 2007, the city council voted to accept this plan, with Greens, Citizens' Coalition, CDU and SPD members voting for it. The cost of the necessary remodelling and renovations is expected to exceed €19 million.

An architectural contest concluded in October 2008; the entry of the Alexander Koblitz architecture firm of Berlin was chosen. The adjacent office building, the Siemenshaus, was demolished and on its site an extension to the Stadthaus is being erected that will incorporate a new main entrance. The work was planned to be completed in 2013. The library re-opened in September 2015, followed by a new youth library in early 2016.
