= Weyarn =

- Municipality
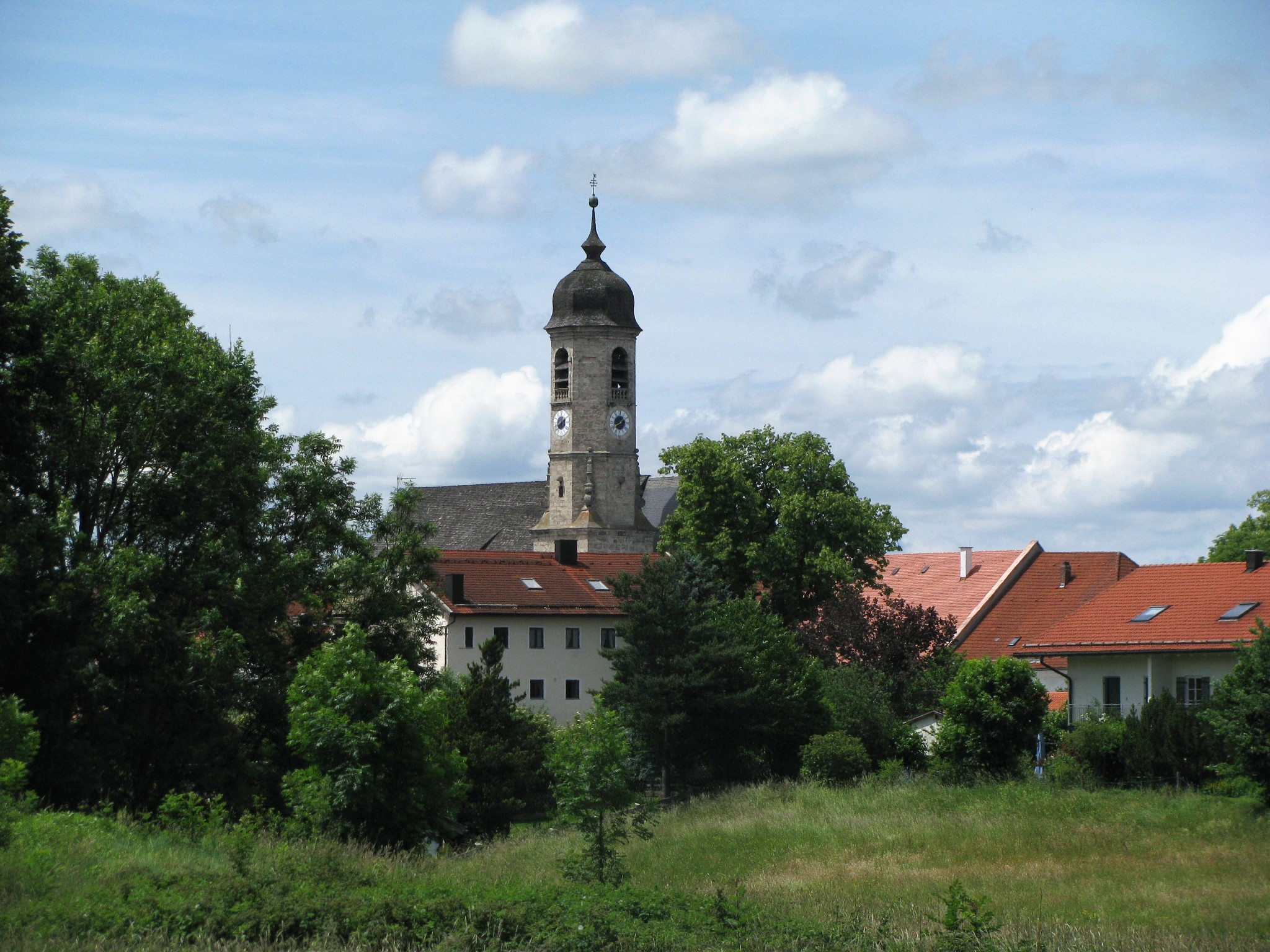
- Saints Peter and Paul Church

- Coat of arms

- Location of Weyarn within Miesbach district
- Interactive map of Weyarn
- Location within Germany Location within Bavaria
- Coordinates: 47°52′N 11°48′E
- Country: Germany
- State: Bavaria
- Admin. region: Oberbayern
- District: Miesbach
- Subdivisions: 28 Ortsteile

Government
  - Mayor (2020–26): Leonhard Wöhr (CSU)

Area
  - Total: 46.7 km^{2} (18.0 sq mi)
- Elevation: 671 m (2,201 ft)

Population (2025-12-31)
  - Total: 3,736
  - Density: 80.0/km^{2} (207/sq mi)
- Time zone: UTC+01:00 (CET)
  - Summer (DST): UTC+02:00 (CEST)
- Postal codes: 83629
- Dialling codes: 08020
- Vehicle registration: MB
- Website: www.weyarn.de

Weyarn (German pronunciation: [ˈvaɪaʁn]) is a municipality in the district of Miesbach in Bavaria in Germany.

It dates back to a monastery that was founded by Siboto II, count of Falkenstein in 1133. It is located 38 km southeast of Munich and can be easily reached on highway A8 running from Munich to Salzburg.

They have worked towards retaining their original identity through a project of Village Renewal since the 1990s. Currently, they have been adjudged to be very successful in this regard, and are now known for their established approach to rural development which has become an example in rural development studies in Germany and Europe. Their approach to rural development has become a subject of analyses in an academic research Journal publications, in and outside Germany. Many farming villages in the surrounding area are part of the municipality.
