= Khatia =

Khatia (Georgian: ხატია; literally "icon") is a feminine Georgian name. It may refer to:

- Khatia Buniatishvili (born 1987), French-Georgian concert pianist
- Khatia Dekanoidze (born 1977), Georgian politician and government minister
- Khatia Moistsrapishvili, Georgian media and political figure
- Khatia Tchkonia, or Chkonia, (born 1989), Georgian female footballer
