= Ananuri Bridge =

Ananuri Bridge ანანურის ხიდი
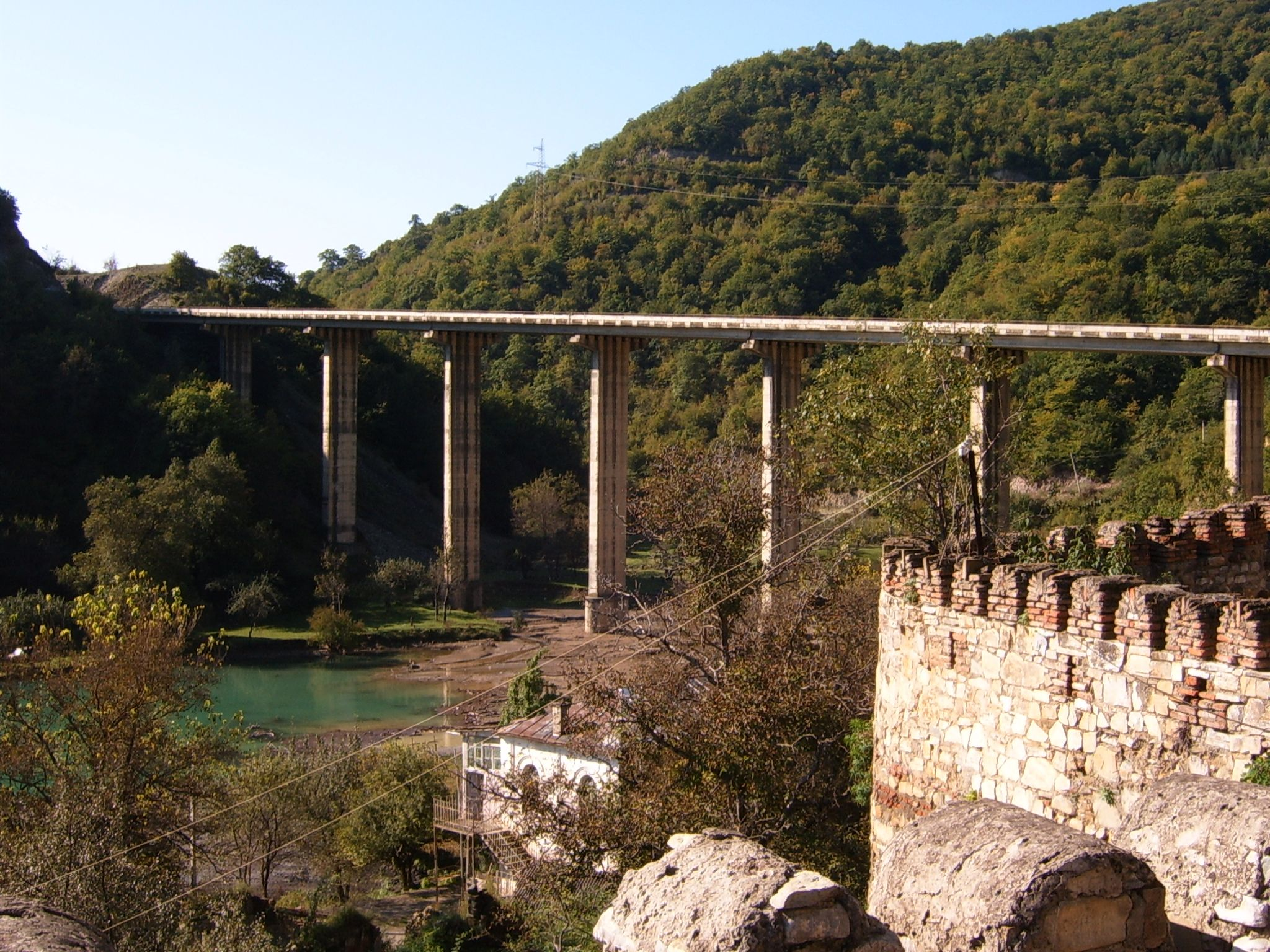
- View of Ananuri Bridge from Ananuri Castle Complex
- Coordinates: 42.1625°N 44.7020°E
- Crosses: Aragvi River
- Locale: Georgia

Characteristics
- Design: truss bridge

History
- Opened: unknown

Ananuri Bridge (Georgian: ანანურის ხიდი, ananuris khidi) is a bridge over the Aragvi River in 45 miles west of Tbilisi, capital of Georgia. The bridge links the Georgian Military Road which goes through the scenic historical Ananuri Castle Complex consisting of two castles joined by a crenellated curtain wall. It is visible from the Ananuri Castle.

== See also ==
- Bridge of Peace
- Baratashvili Bridge
- Architecture of Georgia
