= Baratashvili Bridge =

Baratshvili Bridge ბარათაშვილის ხიდი
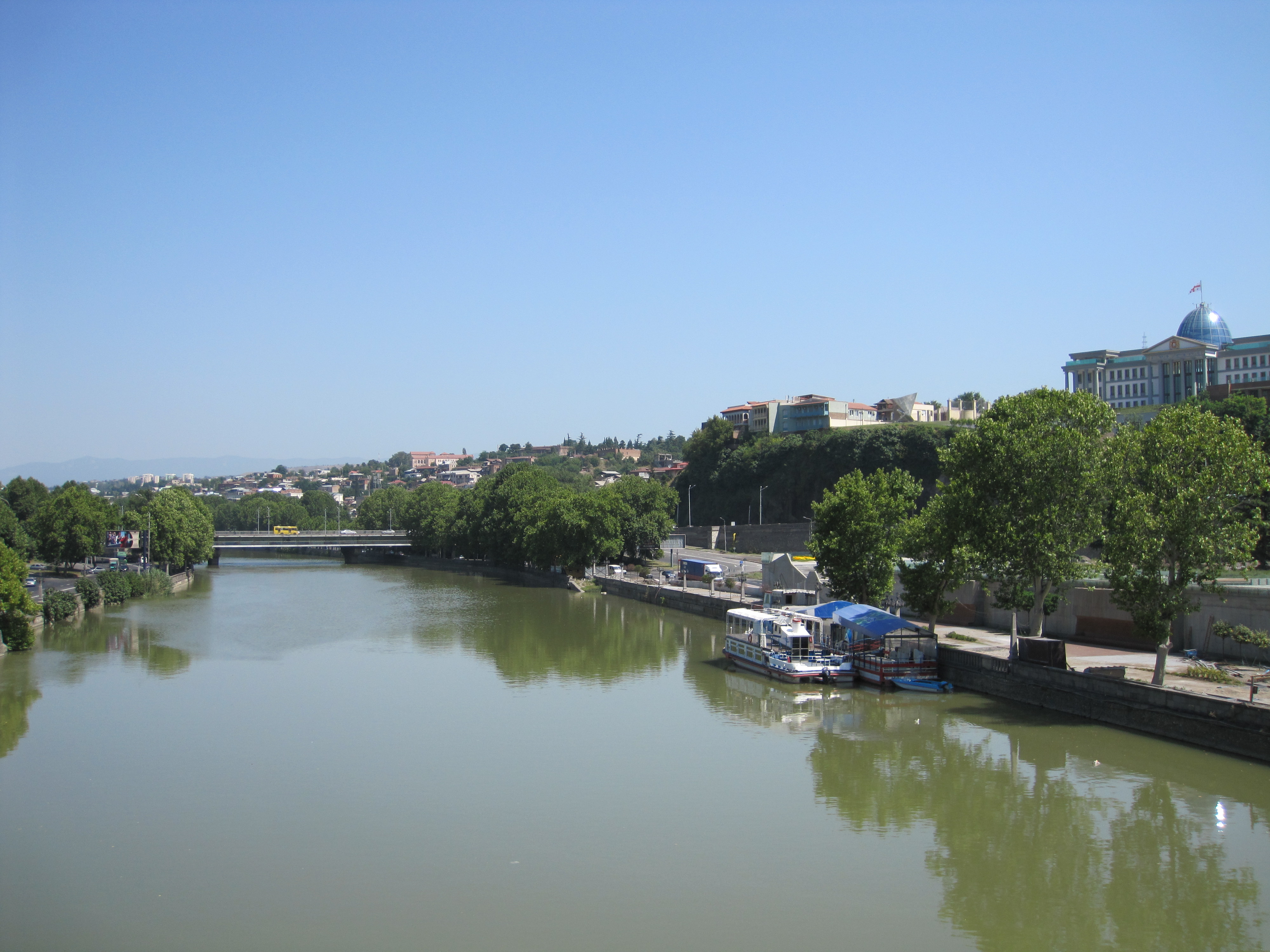
- View of Baratashvili Bridge over Kura River with President's Office on the right
- Coordinates: 41°42′N 44°49′E
- Crosses: Kura River (Mtkvari)
- Locale: Tbilisi, Georgia
- Maintained by: Tbilisi City Administration

Characteristics
- Design: cantilever bridge
- Total length: 150 metres (490 ft)

History
- Opened: 1966

Location
- Interactive map of Baratshvili Bridge ბარათაშვილის ხიდი

Baratashvili Bridge (Georgian: ბარათაშვილის ხიდი, baratashvilis khidi) is a traffic and pedestrian bridge over the Kura River in Tbilisi, capital of Georgia. It was built in 1966 in place of the previously dismantled Mukhrani Bridge honoring Princess Mukhrani.

== Design ==
The bridge, located in Mtasminda district of the city, is often referred to as Bridge of Love, in reference to its current name given in honor of Georgian romanticism poet Nikoloz Baratashvili. The railings of the bridge have been decorated with bronze figures of couples in love. The bridge stretches over Mtkvari River in parallel to the picturesque Bridge of Peace and extends to Tbilisi Airport through a recently renovated highway. The bridge and the highway were renovated by Khidmsheni construction company.

== See also ==
- Bridge of Peace
- Ananuri Bridge
- Ceremonial Palace of Georgia
- Architecture of Georgia
