= Presidency of Salomé Zourabichvili =

Presidency of the current President of Georgia

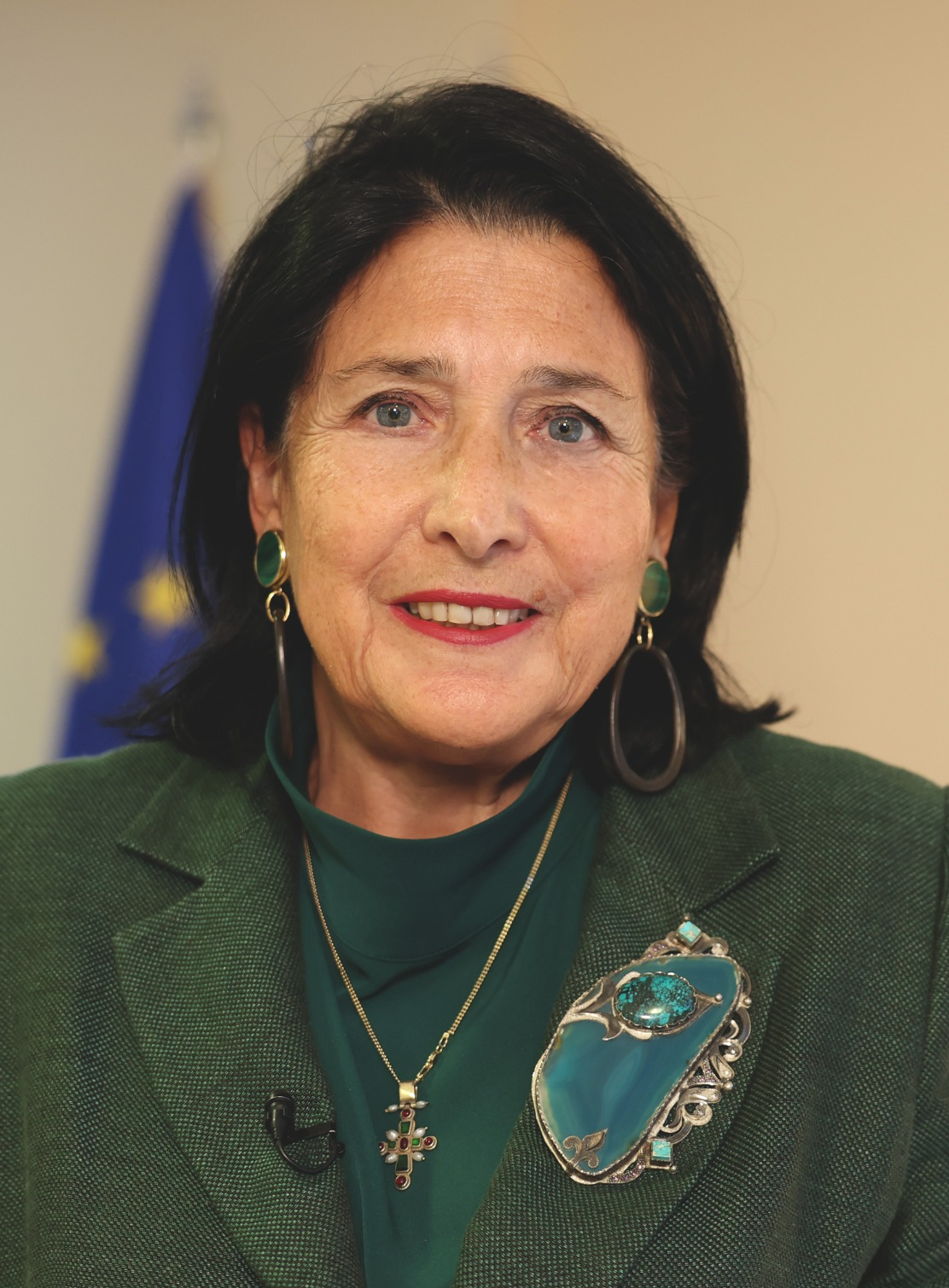
- Presidency of Salome Zourabichvili; 16 December 2018 – Disputed (Note: The presidency has been disputed between Zourabichvili and Mikheil Kavelashvili since 29 December 2024, with all Georgian institutions asserting her term has ended, while Zourabichvili, her supporters and significant parts of the international community asserting that she continues to be the legitimate president.)
- President: Salome Zourabichvili
- Party: Independent
- Seat: Orbeliani Palace
- Standard of the President

Salome Zourabichvili's tenure as the fifth president of Georgia began with her inauguration on 16 December 2018 and has been disputed with Mikheil Kavelashvili since 29 December 2024 as part of a country's political crisis. It was the first presidency since the adoption of a new Constitution transforming Georgia into a parliamentary system in 2018. Zourabichvili's term was the longest term of any presidency in Georgia's history, as the transition into a new Constitution meant that her mandate lasted until 2024.

Salome Zourabichvili is a former French diplomat of Georgian origins who served France's diplomatic corps until her selection as Georgia's Foreign Affairs Minister in 2004. Often a critic of bureaucratic restraints, the concentration of powers, and corruption under the leadership of Mikheil Saakashvili, she became an opposition leader in 2006, until joining the Georgian Dream political coalition as an independent member of Parliament in 2016. In 2018, she was elected in a contentious election with 60% of the vote, making her the second non-partisan President of Georgia (the first being her predecessor, Giorgi Margvelashvili.)

With limited powers compared to her predecessors, Zourabichvili's presidency began with a move to create an investigation into the mysterious death of former President Zviad Gamsakhurdia, a push that was welcomed by both the Georgian Dream ruling party and members of the opposition.

== Background ==
=== Zourabichvili's Background ===
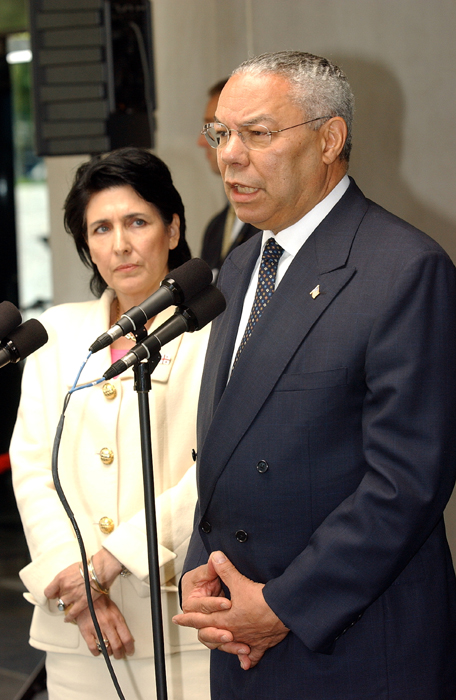
Zourabichvili listening to U.S. Secretary of State Colin Powell while Foreign Affairs Minister.

Born and raised in France from a Georgian family that emigrated to Western Europe following the Soviet takeover of the Democratic Republic of Georgia in 1921, Salomé Zourabichvili kept deep links with the local Georgian community, her father serving as chairman of the Georgian diaspora in Paris, a position later occupied by her brother, Otar. Attending some of the most prestigious political schools in the West, Zourabichvili graduated from the Paris Institute of Political Studies and studied under US geopolitical strategist Zbigniew Brzezinski at Columbia University in 1972.

Zourabichvili took on a foreign policy career in 1974, serving several French embassies across the world, until she was appointed during the Jacques Chirac presidency as head of the Division of International and Strategic Issues of National Defense. In 2003, Paris sent her as ambassador to Georgia during the last days of the Eduard Shevardnadze presidency, where she witnessed the Rose Revolution of November 2003 that overthrew the controversial administration of Shevardnadze and brought to power a new, Western-backed government led by Mikheil Saakashvili.

In March 2004, while still serving as French ambassador in Tbilisi, the Georgian Parliament granted her Georgian citizenship, allowing President Saakashvili to appoint her as Minister of Foreign Affairs, becoming the first woman to occupy that post. As Minister, she soon took on a large reform project, attempting to transition a ministry plagued with corruption and mismanagement under the chaotic years of the Shevardnadze presidency. Her attempts were often met with criticism, including by incumbent ambassadors. Zourabichvili still managed to expand Georgia's cooperation with several post-Soviet nations, leading the creation of a "New Group of Friends of Georgia" which included the Baltic States, Ukraine, Poland, Bulgaria, Romania, and the Czech Republic, while launching an ambitious plan to join NATO and the European community. Most notably, she oversaw the successful negotiations that led to the departure of Russian military bases from Akhalkalaki and Batumi.

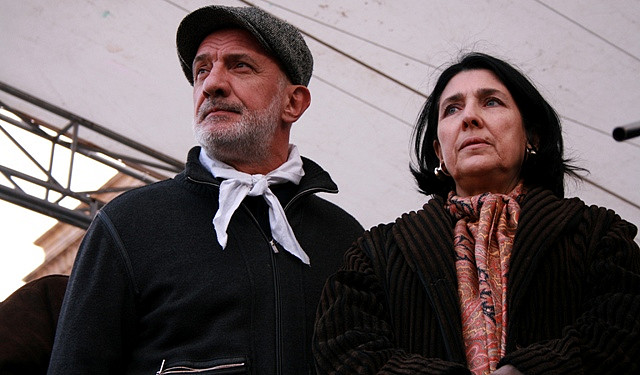
Zourabichvili during an anti-Saakashvili protest in 2009.

Following clashes with Parliament, Salomé Zourabichvili was sacked by Prime Minister Zurab Noghaideli in October 2005, which led her to form the first real opposition party to the Saakashvili administration, The Way of Georgia. While being one of the first mainstream critics of the government, she was soon joined by a string of former government officials and business leaders that criticized President Saakashvili for what they saw as the rise of a police state, assaults on free speech, and corruption in all levels of government. While being informally selected as a potential Prime Minister under a theoretical opposition-led government, she left politics after leading a series of massive protests in Tbilisi in 2009 and taking a high-ranking position working for the United Nations.

In 2012, Zourabichvili endorsed the newly formed Georgian Dream, a coalition of opposition political parties led by businessman Bidzina Ivanishvili, who became Prime Minister following the 2012 legislative elections. In 2016, she was elected to Parliament as an independent, representing the Mtatsminda neighborhood of Tbilisi.

=== New Constitution ===
The 1995 Constitution of Georgia has been in effect ever since its ratification under the Shevardnadze presidency. However, it received some major amendments in its short history, including shortly after the 2003 Rose Revolution, during which President Saakashvili led efforts to increase presidential powers to allow the head of state to dismiss Parliament, while creating the post of Prime Minister.

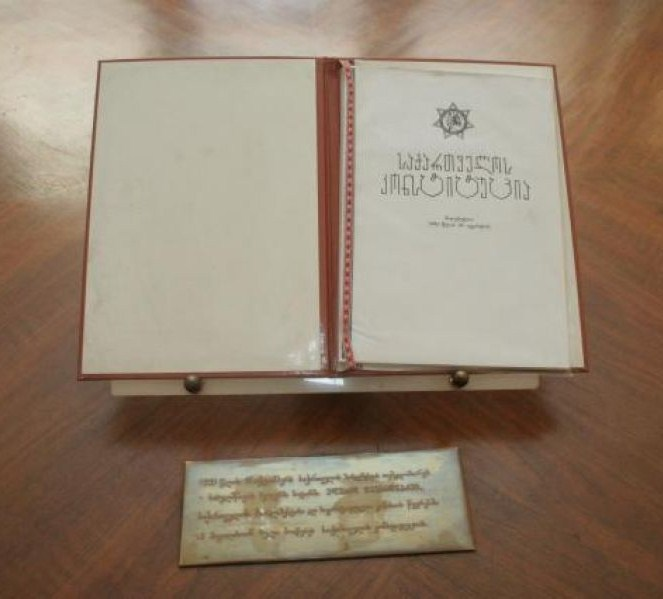
Georgia's Constitution was adopted in 1995 and amended in 2004, 2013, and 2018.

However, the ruling government adopted several major amendments in 2010 that not only undid some of the 2004 changes, but also severely decreased the powers of the Presidency, in an attempt by President Saakashvili to reform the infrastructure of government after his departure. The amendments, which went into effect in 2013, made the Prime Minister the most powerful position in Georgia's domestic infrastructure, granting him the power to appoint and fire ministers, while being himself elected by Parliament, instead of being selected by the President. The reforms kept the President's foreign policy prerogatives, including the appointment of ambassadors, but gave Parliament the power to ratify any international negotiations, while keeping the President as the commander-in-chief of the armed forces, a significant power in the wake of the Georgian-Russian conflict. Among other changes, the President kept the power to appoint the head of the Ajaran Autonomous Republic, but lost the power to appoint and dismiss regional governors.

The new Constitution was one of the most significant changes in Georgian political history and was transitioned into force under the leaderships of Prime Ministers Bidzina Ivanishvili and Irakli Garibashvili and President Giorgi Margvelashvili, who succeeded Saakashvili in 2013.

More amendments were set to be inaugurated with the 2018 presidential election, further weakening the presidency's powers. Notably, the President lost the right to participate in cabinet discussions and the President was removed from the National Security Council, which manages the military developments of Georgia's armed forces and oversees the country's national security and defence policy. These final amendments also abolished popular elections for President, guaranteeing the winner of the 2018 election to be the last publicly elected head of state; instead, starting in 2024, the President will be selected by an Electoral College of 300 members, including members of Parliament and representatives of local governments.

== 2018 Presidential Election ==
Due to the constitutional amendments of 2010, the 2018 presidential election was set to be the last such election in Georgian history. 46 candidates filed to run for the position, but only 25 were admitted by the Central Election Commission. In August 2013, in a largely expected announcement, President Giorgi Margvelashvili, first elected in 2013, refused to run for reelection, following a presidency filled with clashes with Parliament. Instead, Salomé Zourabichvili announced her candidacy as an independent candidate on 6 August and secured the support of the ruling political coalition, Georgian Dream, which decided to not field a candidate from its own ranks on 9 September.

Meanwhile, former Parliament Speaker Davit Bakradze, former Foreign Affairs Minister Grigol Vashadze, and 22 other candidates were nominated by multiple political parties or ran as independent candidates. The campaign season included many topics, including welfare programs, the legal future of cannabis, immigration, the Russian-Georgian conflict and the separatist issues in Abkhazia and South Ossetia. Soon, the campaigns mainly coalesced around those of Bakradze and Vashadze, who shared the support of former President Saakashvili's partisans, and that of Zourabichvili, who touted her foreign policy experience and her position to protect the Abkhaz language in the face of increased Russian integration of Abkhazia.

Following a large discrepancy between public polls, 1.6 million voters participated in the first round of the election, which saw Salomé Zourabichvili pull ahead, followed by United National Movement's Grigol Vashadze. During the second phase of the campaign, Zourabichvili raised an overwhelming amount of money, including 80% of total donations, while positioning herself as a candidate representing the rural regions of Georgia, in contrast with Vashadze, who won the popular vote in large cities during the first round of voting. Ultimately, Salomé Zourabichvili won the final vote, obtaining almost 60% of the total vote in an election with 57% voter turnout.

== Transition and Inauguration ==
President-elect Salome Zourabichvili met sitting President Giorgi Margvelashvili on 3 December, inaugurating the first cordial transition of power between two Georgian presidents. (In 1992, Zviad Gamsakhurdia was ousted by a violent coup, while Eduard Shevardnadze was deposed in 2003 during the Rose Revolution, and Mikheil Saakashvili refused to attend the inauguration of his successor in 2013.) However, a revised budget proposal presented by the Finance Ministry shortly prior to the runoff revealed severe financial cuts to the President's budget, significantly changing the nature of the presidency. The proposal reduced the budget by 39% of its total funding, cutting the allocated staff from 140 to just 60 members, and abolishing the President's Reserve Fund, a special budget allocating funds to projects chosen by the Presidency.

Opposition leaders, meanwhile, called foul on the electoral results, despite their certification by the Central Election Commission. Grigol Vashadze called on 12 December for massive protests across the country and threatened to sue the new administration over electoral results. While Telavi, the provincial capital of Kakheti, was selected as the inaugural city by the Zourabichvili team, leaders of the United National Movement announced they would hold large protests in front of the inaugural site, protests that would eventually be moved or prevented by local law enforcement. On 16 December, rallies were held in Batumi, Zugdidi, Kutaisi, and Tbilisi, leading to injuries for two police officers and the arrest of UNM leader Davit Kirkitadze.

During the transition period, Zourabichvili met with several government and foreign leaders, including EU Ambassador Carl Hartzell and NATO Representative James Appathurai, reassuring her future administration's goal to pursue a pro-Western policy. Meanwhile, in an attempt to diffuse nationwide protests, she offered to invite Grigol Vashadze on 6 December if the latter agreed to concede the victory.

A day before the oath-taking ceremony, on 15 December, President-elect Salomé Zourabichvili laid a wreath at the memorial of fallen Georgian soldiers at Heroes’ Square in Tbilisi. She also visited the Mtatsminda Pantheon, a cemetery of public figures in Tbilisi. Salomé Zourabichvili was inaugurated as President of Georgia on 16 December at Batonis Tsikhe, the royal palace of Erekle II in Telavi, in front of a crowd of 2,000 Georgian and international guests, including incumbent government leaders, Catholicos-Patriarch Ilia II, former French President Nicolas Sarkozy, and Armenian President Armen Sarkissian.

=== International Reactions ===
Foreign leaders soon congratulated Zourabichvili during her time as President-elect, including US President Donald Trump, who touted Georgia's and the United States' close relationship as strategic partners. Among other foreign comments on Salomé Zourabichvili's election were:

Country	Public comments
Armenia	President Armen Sarkissian, who attended the presidential inauguration, "hopes the friendly relations between the two countries would be further enhanced". Prime Minister Nikol Pashinyan posted on Twitter, "Congratulations to Salome Zurabishvili. Your election as the first female president of Georgia is, indeed, a historic event and I sincerely wish that your term of office will be marked by continuous uplift and prosperity in the history of Georgia."
Austria	Federal President Alexander Van der Bellen penned a letter stating, "It is with great pleasure that I extend my sincere congratulations on your inauguration as the new President of Georgia. [...] I avail myself of this opportunity to wish you the best of success in the accomplishment of your important duties."
Azerbaijan	President Ilham Aliyev extended "my heartfelt congratulations to you on your election as president of Georgia. Azerbaijan and Georgia are bound together by traditional relations of friendship and good neighborliness." An Azerbaijani delegation was invited to attend Zurabishvili's inauguration, led by parliamentary speaker Ogtay Asadov.
Belarus	President Alexander Lukashenka expressed his confidence that the two countries would continue "intensive contacts" on political, economic and humanitarian issues, and strengthen bilateral dialogue.
Estonia	President Kersti Kaljulaid said on Twitter, "Congratulations to Salome Zurabishvili on her election as President of Georgia. Looking forward to further strengthening the already excellent relations between Estonia and Georgia based on shared values and common interests.
France	President Emmanuel Macron became one of the first foreign leaders to congratulate Zurabishvili, writing in a letter, "I want to warmly congratulate you on behalf of France and on my personal behalf for your election as the head of the Georgian state in a process that demonstrates the attachment of the Georgian people to democratic values." In 2017, Zurabishvili was one of dozens of French diplomats who had endorsed Macron's candidacy for the French presidency. Later, the French Ministry of Foreign Affairs issued a statement saying, "France stands ready to work with Ms. Zourabichvili in order to further strengthen the long-standing and excellent relations between our two countries. The new president can count on our determination to continue to take action in support of Georgia's sovereignty and territorial integrity within its internationally recognized borders. Former French President Nicolas Sarkozy attended the inauguration on behalf of Emmanuel Macron.
Morocco	King Mohammed VI sent Zurabishvili a message, welcoming "the strong ties of friendship between the two countries and assured the new President of his determination to working together for the consolidation of the Moroccan-Georgian cooperation relations, for the greater good of the two friendly peoples."
Lithuania	President Dalia Grybauskaite congratulated Zurabishvili, saying "best luck serving your country and its people!"
Russia	Foreign Ministry spokeswoman Maria Zakharova stated that Moscow will be "maintaining its position in respect of Georgia. It was not Russia who initiated cutting the diplomatic ties with this country. We maintain that it was a colossal mistake made by those who were in power at that time in Georgia."
Spain	Foreign Affairs Minister Josep Borrell tweeted, "Spain congratulated President-elect of Georgia Salome Zurabishvili, the first female Head of State in the Southern Caucasus."
Turkey	The Foreign Ministry issued a statement saying, "We hope the results of the elections will be beneficial for the people of Georgia. We believe that the results of the elections will further contribute to the strategic partnership between Turkey and Georgia."
Ukraine	President Petro Poroshenko wrote on Twitter, "I wish you every success in ensuring Georgia's democratic European development and consolidation of society. I'm convinced of the further deepening of strategic partnership between our two nations."
United Kingdom	Queen Elizabeth II signed a letter congratulating Mrs. Zurabishvili. Alan Duncan, State Minister for Europe and the Americas, congratulated President-Elect Zurabishvili, affirming that "The UK and Georgia are strategic partners. I welcome the President-elect's determination to bring society together and to uphold the democratic standards which the people of Georgia demand and deserve."
United States	The U.S. Embassy in Tbilisi congratulated Zurabishvili, stating that the US and Georgia are and will remain strong partners, adding "We fully support Georgian democracy, prosperity, territorial integrity within its internationally recognized borders, and Western integration, and we are determined to work with our friends here toward this country's success." Robert Palladino, deputy State Department spokesperson, briefed his press corps, saying "the United States looks forward to working with President-elect Salome Zurabishvili and continuing our closer partnership with Georgia on range of important bilateral and regional issues, including our robust security cooperation and Georgia's contributions to NATO's Resolute Support Mission in Afghanistan." On 12 November, US Secretary of State Mike Pompeo held a phone conversation with Zurabishvili, where the two discussed US-Georgian cooperation on common global security priorities, the United States' unwavering support for Georgia's sovereignty, independence, and territorial integrity, and the importance of electoral and judicial reforms for Georgia's democratic development and Western integration. On 14 December, President Donald Trump wrote Zurabishvili a congratulatory letter, writing "The United States fully supports Georgia's territorial integrity, prosperity, and democratic development, as well as Georgia's further integration with the West."

International organizations also reacted publicly to Salomé Zourabichvili's election, in the following manner:

International Organization	Public Comments
NATO	Special Representative for the Caucasus and Central Asia James Appathurai posted on Facebook, "Congratulations to Salome Zurabishvili on her election as the next President of Georgia. Congratulations also to the people of Georgia for an election that has been assessed as free and competitive. It was clearly a hard fought campaign and more should be done to ensure a level playing field for all candidates in the future. I look forward to meeting the Georgian leadership soon, and carrying on our work together." President-elect Zurabishvili, meanwhile, announced on 30 November that NATO membership was one of her main priorities.
UN	United Nations General Assembly President María Fernanda Espinosa tweeted, "My heartfelt congratulations to Salome Zurabishvili on being elected Georgia's first female president. Always encouraging to see growing roles of Women in Power."
OSCE	The OSCE had sent an electoral observation team that reported, following the election, that the presidential runoff was "competitive and candidates were able to campaign freely," while noting "concern instances of misuse of administrative resources, undue pressure on voters and intimidation."
EU	European Council President Donald Tusk and European Commission President Jean-Claude Juncker co-signed a letter stating that "these last direct presidential elections were an important moment for Georgia, marking the conclusion of the shift to a full parliamentary system. These were hard-fought elections and your leadership in overcoming political polarization will be of paramount importance," they addressed Zurabishvili. "The EU remains committed to continuing our excellent bilateral cooperation with Georgia. We look forward to working together to continue the consolidation of Georgia's democratic institutions and to advance the political association and economic integration between EU and Georgia."

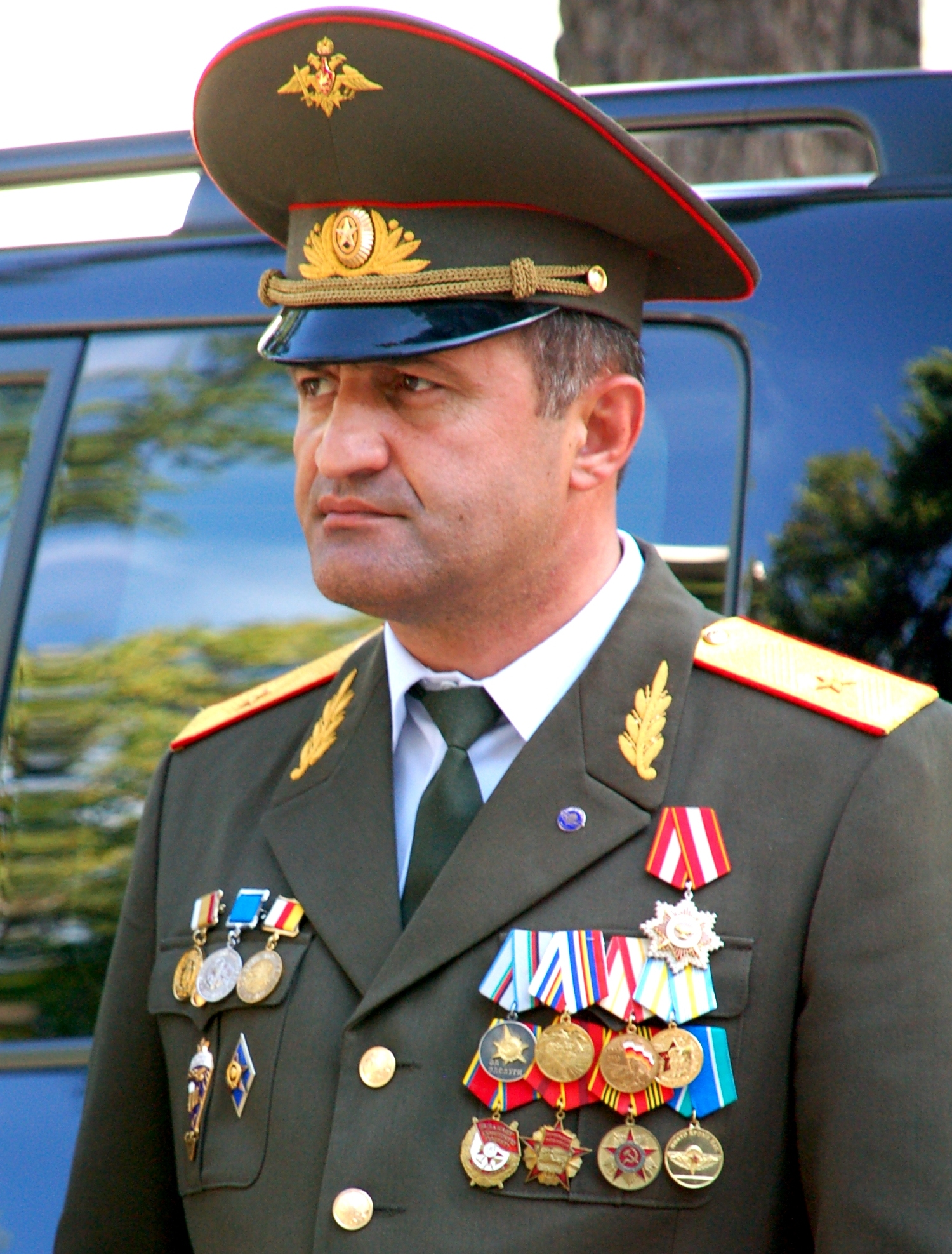
Anatoly Bibilov, the president of South Ossetia, a disputed region internationally recognised as part of Georgia, refused to comment on Zourabichvili's election.

Meanwhile, the foreign affairs bureaus of the separatist administrations in Abkhazia and South Ossetia also reacted to Salomé Zourabichvili's election. Daur Kove, Abkhazia's foreign affairs minister, expressed hope that election of Georgia's new President could serve as a positive foundation for building dialogue between Tbilisi and Sokhumi. South Ossetia's Dmitry Medoyev, who serves as the secessionist republic's foreign affairs minister, refused to comment on the election, claiming that Georgia's domestic affairs had nothing to do with the Tskhinvali government.

== Appointments ==
President Zourabichvili inherited a weakened presidency, not only by the newly established Constitution, but also by budgetary cuts made by Parliament in 2018, limiting the presidential staff to only 60 members. On 24 December 2018, she announced her first slate of advisers and staffers, including:

- Lasha Zhvania, former Economy Minister, as Chief of Staff (resigned to become Ambassador to Israel on 1 May 2019)
  - Ketevan Mekharashvili as Deputy Chief of Staff and Adviser on Ethnic Minority and Gender Equality Issues
  - Natia Sulava as Deputy Chief of Staff and Adviser on Diaspora and Citizenship Issues
- Dimitri Gabunia as Parliamentary Secretary
- Simon Petridisi as Adviser on Disability Issues
- Constantine Natsvlishvili as Adviser on Culture, Education, and Science Affairs
- Khatia Moistsrapishvili as Press Secretary (dismissed on 10 September 2019)
- Irina Shengelaia as Adviser on Public Relations and Strategic Planning
- Ketevan Tatoshvili as Adviser on Business, Tourism, and Economic Issues

Per the Constitution, President Zourabichvili is also guaranteed the right to make nominations to the Central Election Commission. On 21 December 2018, she nominated Tamar Zhvania, Mariam Shelegia, and Vladimer Bozhadze as candidates to head the Commission. The CEC's Board of Directors eventually selected Tamar Zhvania, who had been serving as Chair since 2013, for a second term, making her the first elections chief in Georgia to serve for two terms.

The President has the power to sign off on ambassadorial appointments made by the government. As President, Salome Zourabichvili has appointed the following Ambassadors:

Name	Countries	Residence	Appointment Date
Mamuka Murjikneli	Turkmenistan; Afghanistan	Ashgabat	1 February 2019
Levan Ghvachliani	Lithuania	Vilnius	1 February 2019
Zurab Abdushelashvili	Uzbekistan; Tajikistan	Tashkent	22 March 2019
Tea Katukia	France; Monaco; UNESCO	Paris	31 July 2019
Lasha Zhvania	Israel	Tel-Aviv	1 August 2019
Teimuraz Sharashenidze	Ukraine; GUAM	Kyiv	11 September 2019
Konstantine Zhghenti	Kuwait; United Arab Emirates	Kuwait City	11 September 2019
Ketevan Bagration of Mukhrani	Holy See; Sovereign Military Order of Malta	Rome	11 September 2019

== Presidency ==
=== New Palace and Public Appearances ===
Since 2009, the President of Georgia has resided at the Presidential Palace in the Avlabari neighborhood of Tbilisi, built during the presidency of Mikheil Saakashvili. However, this residence has been controversial, with critiques pointing out its lack of historical significance, its foreign design, and its overly large size. During the 2013 presidential election, the Georgian Dream party pledged to end the presidency's residence in the Avlabari building, but President Giorgi Margvelashvili refused to move out of the residence once in office.

President Zourabichvili pledged during the 2018 campaign to move the administration out of the Avlabari palace and refused to set foot in the building during the first weeks of her term. Instead, the administration has been moved to a 19th-century structure, the Orbeliani Palace on Atoneli Street.

President Zourabichvili has made several public appearances leading up to the 2019 New Year's Eve. Notably, she awarded medals to paraathletes in a ceremony planned by the Ministry of Culture and attended a concert to honor the Georgian victims of Soviet oppression. For the 2019 New Year's Eve, she held a televised conference call at the Ministry of Defense with Georgian troops stationed in Afghanistan, Central African Republic, and Mali.

The president held her first press conference on 11 January, where she detailed her positions on current events and outlined her main foreign policy priorities, including international cooperation on environmental protection and following the steps to join the European community. Among her main legislative goals, President Zourabichvili emphasized her support for regulatory actions against defamation, in the same spirit as France's 2018 law to curb the rise of fake news during electoral times.

=== Regional Politics ===
==== Regional Visits ====
Salome Zourabichvili made a point early on in her presidency to visit regional centers of Georgia, choosing to host her inauguration in Telavi and her inaugural party in Tsinandali, two cities of Kakheti. For her first annual Christmas tree lighting, she paid a visit to Samegrelo-Zemo Svaneti, a region that suffered severely during the 1990s civil war, with her administration organizing a concert with Georgian singers (including Natia Todua) to benefit local children. President Zourabichvili also visited the conflict zone village of Rukhi, where a hospital funded by the Georgian Ministry of Defense is being built to welcome Abkhaz medical refugees, and the Enguri Bridge, the only crossing point open between Georgia proper and the secessionist republic of Abkhazia.

On 14 January, she returned to Kakheti to participate with the local governor and Metropolitan Davit of Alaverdi at the National Day of Theater in the city of Telavi.

Region	Municipalities	Date	Purpose
Kakheti	Telavi	16 December 2018	Inauguration
Samegrelo-Zemo Svaneti	Zugdidi	4–5 January 2019	Orthodox Christmas celebration, visit of the Enguri Bridge checkpoint in the Georgian-Abkhaz conflict zone.
Kakheti	Telavi	14 January 2019	National Day of Theater
Imereti	Tsqaltubo; Kutaisi	9–10 February 2019	Visit to the abandoned spa resorts of Tsqaltubo and reveal of economic plan for Imereti.
Kvemo Kartli	Marneuli; Bolnisi; Gardabani	21–22 March 2019	Celebration of Nowruz with ethnic Azerbaijani communities.
Ajara	Batumi	6 April 2019	Opening ceremony of the 2019 European Weightlifting Championships.
Samtskhe-Javakheti	Akhaltsikhe	April 13–14, 2019	Regional visit.
Kakheti	Sagarejo	April 21, 2019	Visit of the David Gareja Monastery Complex, calling on Azerbaijan and Georgia to delimitate their state border.
Kakheti	Akhaltsikhe	April 23, 2019	Visit of the Alexander Chavchavadze House-Museum in Tsinandali.
Kvemo Kartli	Gardabani	April 30, 2019	Celebrating the 28th anniversary of the Georgian Armed Forces at the Vaziani Military Base.
Samtskhe-Javakheti	Ninotsminda	June 1, 2019	Opening the Road of Saint Nino, an annual pilgrimage retracing the steps of Saint Nino as she christianized Georgia in the 4th century, from Lake Paravani.
Racha-Lechkhumi and Kvemo Svaneti	Ambrolauri	June 7, 2019	Coordinated visit with the United Nations Office in Georgia, to promote the UN's 17 Sustainable Development Goals.
Kakheti	Dedoplistsqaro	June 9, 2019	Inauguration of the Saint Nino Church in the Bodbe Monastery complex.
Samtskhe-Javakheti	Adigeni; Borjomi	June 15–16, 2019	Regional visit to raise awareness about lack of professional workers in the region and to raise the region's status as a wellness tourism destination.

==== Economic Proposals for Imereti ====
In February 2019, President Zourabichvili visited the western Georgian region of Imereti, including the municipality of Tskaltubo and the regional capital of Kutaisi. During her visit, she visited abandoned Soviet-era spas built under the Stalin regime that lost popularity during the civil conflicts of the 1990s, criticizing the lack of development resulting from a poorly managed privatization process. During her visit, she proposed a plan to boost the central Imereti economy by bringing a new life to the spa culture of Tskaltubo, a plan that she repeated during her later visit to France, where Zourabichvili proposed a private-public partnership with French companies.

During a speech at the Kutaisi State University, Zourabichvili underlined that funding for a renovation project of Tskaltubo could partially come from savings from the closure of the Parliament building in Kutaisi, as the legislature had moved to Tbilisi in 2018. She proposed the creation of a convention center to be housed in the former parliamentary building, an idea that would be endorsed later by Mariam Jashi, chairwoman of the Education, Science, and Culture Committee of the Georgian Parliament.

=== Domestic Policy ===
==== New Investigation into Gamsakhurdia's Death ====
Two days prior to Zourabichvili's inauguration, Constantine and Tsotne Gamsakhurdia, the sons of Georgia's first President Zviad Gamsakhurdia, announced concerns that the investigation into their father's controversial death in 1993, which is set to expire at the end of 2018 due to statute of limitations, would end without any clear results. They then announced the beginning of a hunger strike, demanding an expansion of the statute of limitations. Zviad Gamsakhurdia died in the midst of a civil war in a Mingrelian village on 31 December 1993, and Tbilisi, at the time controlled by Eduard Shevardnadze -who had participated in his ouster,- ruled his death a suicide.

On 21 December, President Zourabichvili formally endorsed the request to expand the statute of limitations, calling Gamsakhurdia's death a "murder", a move supported by opposition and ruling party members of Parliament. Less than a week later, Parliament approved a bill to expand the statute of limitations for serious crimes from 25 to 30 years after the crime, following Constantine Gamsakhurdia's hospitalization.

On 26 December, following the set-up of a new investigative group under the leadership of General Prosecutor Shalva Tadumadze, Tsotne Gamsakhurdia ended his hunger strike, thus promising a new investigation into his father's death.

==== Use of Pardons ====
Georgia's Constitution grants the President of Georgia the power to grant pardons. On 31 December 2018, President Zourabichvili used her pardon power to free three women from prison, including a pregnant woman, a mother of three, and a mother of a young child.

It was revealed in January 2019 that three members, representing NGOs, of the 10-member Pardon Commission, tasked with making recommendations to the President, resigned from the Commission, prompting calls by Deputy Sophio Kiladze, head of Parliament's Human Rights Committee, to adopt more western standards with the pardoning processes, arguing that the previous administration's system of pardoning was "flawed".

During her annual Address to Parliament, President Zourabichvili announced a plan to reform the pardon system in Georgia and place the pardoning infrastructure under the Ministry of Justice.

On 23 June 2023, She pardoned Opposition Activist and CEO of the Mtavari Arkhi TV Channel Nika Gvaramia.

=== Foreign Affairs ===
==== Euro-Atlantic Integration ====
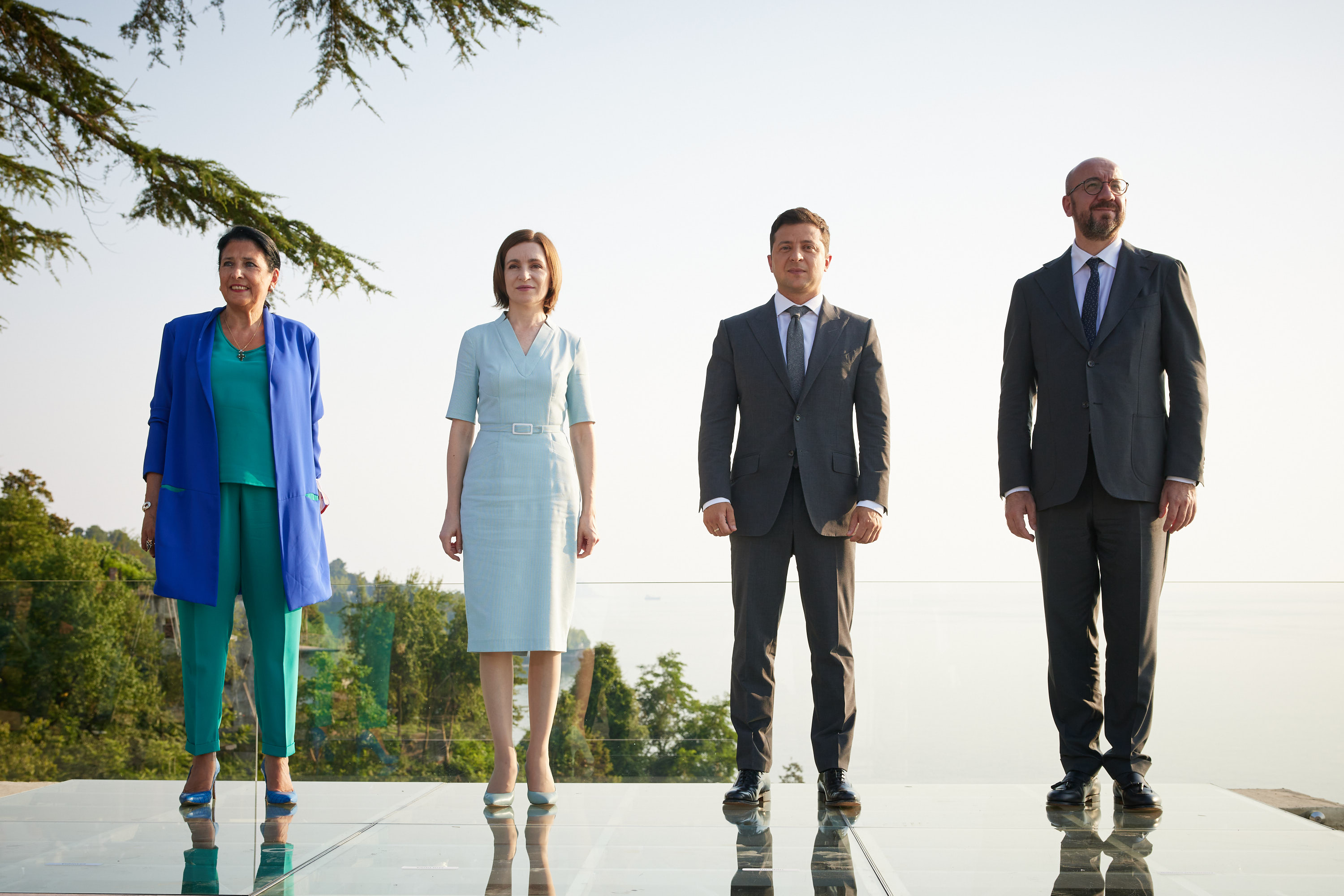
President of Georgia Salome Zourabichvili, President of Moldova Maia Sandu, President of Ukraine Volodymyr Zelenskyy and President of the European Council Charles Michel during the 2021 Batumi International Conference.

Since the beginning of her presidency, President Zourabichvili made the most significant priority of her administration's foreign policy Euro-Atlantic integration and, notably, accessing membership to the European Union and NATO. To that end, she chose her first visit abroad to Brussels, often considered as the capital of Europe, to meet with Donald Tusk, Jean-Claude Juncker, Antonio Tajani, Federica Mogherini, Johannes Hahn, Dimitris Avramopoulos, Michel Barnier, and Jens Stoltenberg, in January 2019. While in Brussels, she announced her plan to access a de facto membership to the European Union, attempting to forge alliances with the EU in fields like culture, transportation, education, security, and others until Tbilisi can gain the formal status of a member.

As President, she signed with President Emmanuel Macron of France the Dimitri Amilakhvari Structured Dialogue Declaration, creating an annual formal setting for inter-parliamentary, security, cultural, educational, and political cooperation between Paris and Tbilisi. She also oversaw the signature by the Ministries of Defense of Georgia and Lithuania of an agreement on cybersecurity cooperation. In May 2019, Georgia will host the Batumi Conference to celebrate the decennial of the EU's Eastern Partnership, an event to which Zourabichvili has invited Macron, German Federal President Frank-Walter Steinmeier, German Chancellor Angela Merkel, Lithuanian President Dalia Grybauskaite, and several other leaders of the European Union.

On 25 March 2019, NATO Secretary-General Jens Stoltenberg, during an official visit to Tbilisi, was hosted by President Zourabichvili and pledged the eventual accession of Georgia into the Alliance.

==== International Security ====
Salome Zourabichvili's second visit abroad was made to Afghanistan during the memorial day of King David IV, known as "The Builder". Almost 900 Georgians currently take part in NATO's Resolute Support Mission to assist Afghan troops in the 18-year War in Afghanistan. She visited both Kabul and the Bagram Airfield where Georgian soldiers are stationed, meeting with NATO and US military leadership and President Ashraf Ghani.

President Zourabichvili has made it one of her top foreign policy priorities to join the Northern Atlantic Alliance and has, toward this end, overseen the signature of a cybersecurity cooperation agreement with Lithuania's Ministry of Defense and a broad declaration with France guaranteeing, among other things, military and security cooperation between Paris and Tbilisi. In March 2019, her administration was in talks with the European External Action Service -the EU's foreign policy arm- on the potential for more cooperation in cybsersecurity and hybrid challenges with Brussels.

On 25 March 2019, NATO Secretary-General Jens Stoltenberg visited Tbilisi and met with President Zourabichvili, where the two reiterated that Georgia would eventually join NATO.

==== South Caucasus Dynamics ====
Among her foreign policy prerogatives, Salome Zourabichvili has shaped a relatively new approach toward regional cooperation among the South Caucasus countries: Georgia, Armenia, and Azerbaijan. She visited Baku on 27 February 2019 for an official visit with President Ilham Aliyev, where she reiterated Georgia's support for Azerbaijan's territorial integrity and called the Nagorno-Karabakh separatist republic an "occupied territory", comparing it to Georgia's Abkhazia and South Ossetia regions.

This stance received substantial criticism from Armenia, which has financially, logistically, and militarily supported the Nagorno-Karabakh separatists, criticism that would be repeated by Ashot Mirzoyan, chairman of Armenia's National Assembly, during Zourabichvili's Armenia visit in March 2019. On the other hand, President Zourabichvili has been openly critical of Yerevan's informal positions on Georgia's secessionist republics: she criticized the close ties between Abkhazian, South Ossetian, and Karabakhian separatists (notably the signature of a cooperation agreement between Tskhinvali, Sokhumi, and Stepanakert) during meetings with President Armen Sarkissian and Prime Minister Nikol Pashinyan, and denounced the Armenian Apostolic Church's decision to move the Armenian churches in separatist Abkhazia from its Eparchy in Georgia to its Moscow-based Eparchy in Russia during a meeting with Catholicos Karekin II.

Many analysts have noted Zourabichvili's new dynamics in dealing with her South Caucasus neighbors, with several Armenian foreign policy experts noting a significant Baku-leaning view, a view that has been denied by Tbilisi, which underlines its positive relations and common projects with Armenia in economic, touristic, cultural, and other fields.

==== Black Sea Security ====
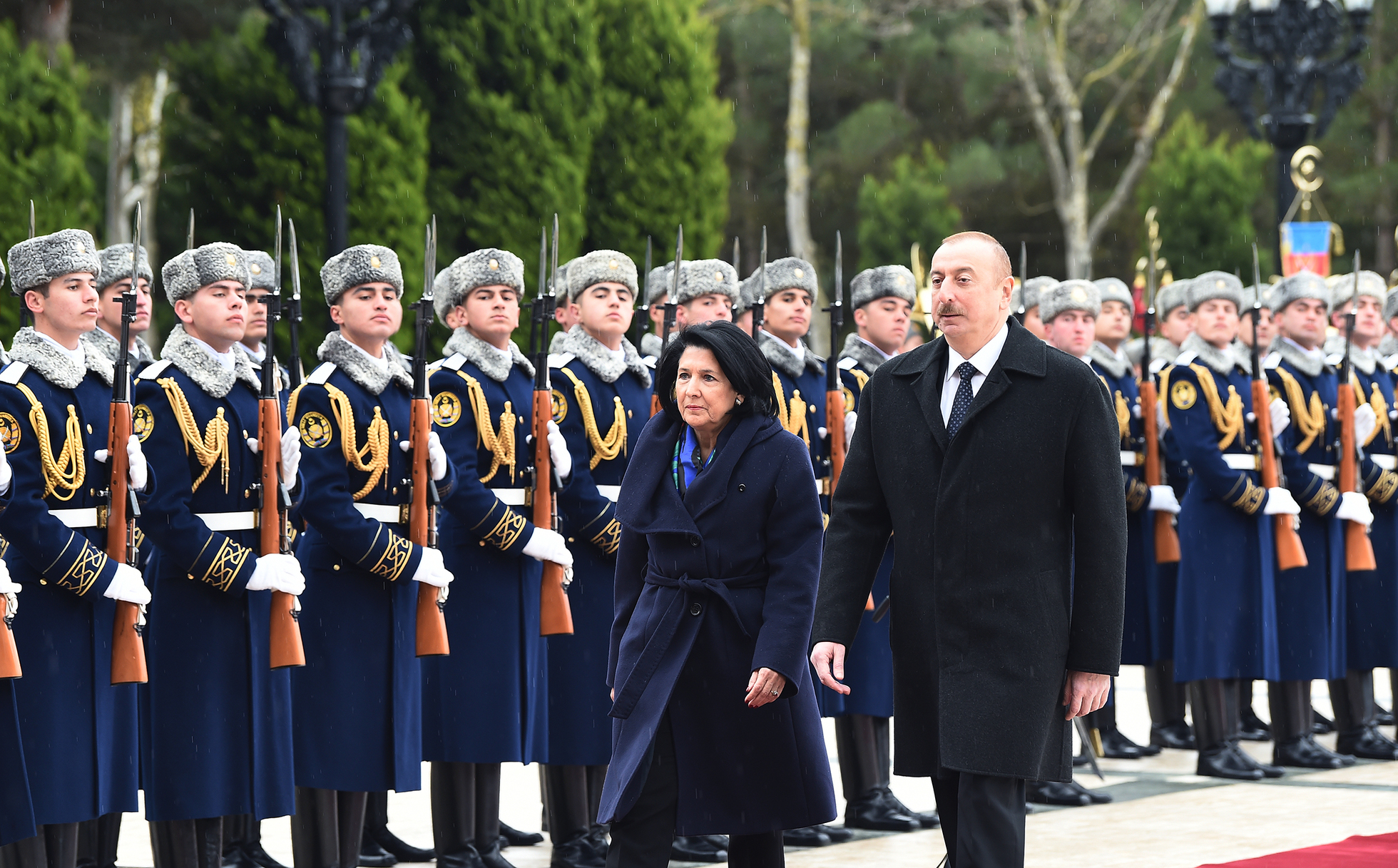
Zourabichvili in Azerbaijan, 20 February 2019.

One of President Zourabichvili's stated regional policy priorities has been the boosting of security and cooperation in the Black Sea, particularly in the wake of the Azov Sea crisis between Ukraine and Russia. She notably proposed the creation of a "center of excellence", potentially sponsored by NATO, to coordinate security and relations between Alliance members on the Black Sea and Georgia. On 25 March 2019, Georgia joined the European Union's Long-Range Identification and Tracking (LRIT) system, becoming the first non-EU member to join the tracking system and allowing Georgia to track ships sailing under the Georgian flag and identifying any other vessel sailing within 1,000 nautical miles of Georgia's borders.

=== Approval ratings ===
Throughout the first half of her term, Zourabichvili maintained low approval ratings for her handling of the job as President. In a poll conducted by the International Republican Institute (IRI) in November 2019, 70% had an unfavorable opinion of Zourabichvili, with only 23% holding a favorable opinion. In February 2021, her favorability rating was 31% according to IRI, with 62% perceiving her unfavorably.

After the outbreak of the 2022 Russian invasion of Ukraine, Zourabichvili′s standing in polling increased significantly, with a poll by the National Democratic Institute (NDI) showing that 63% of the population approved of her response to the war. According to IRI, her favorability rating rose to 52% by April 2022, but fell to 38% by November 2022, while still being above her popularity ratings before the Russian invasion of Ukraine started. Following her support of the 2023 Georgian protests, her approval ratings soared once again. According to a poll conducted by Edison Research in July 2024, Zourabichvili was Georgia′s most popular politician.

Polling firm	Fieldwork date	Sample size	Favorability ratings			
Polling firm	Fieldwork date	Sample size	check	X mark	Question	Net
Edison Research	11–24 Jul 2024	1,000	63	37	–	26
Institute of Polling & Marketing/IRI	4–23 Mar 2023	1,500	48	47	5	1
CRRC	Jan 23	N/A	N/A	N/A	N/A	−21
Institute of Polling & Marketing/IRI	13 Sep–12 Oct 2022	1,500	38	54	7	−16
Institute of Polling & Marketing/IRI	4–24 Mar 2022	1,486	52	45	3	7
Edison Research	12–25 Sep 2021	1,500	37	63	–	−24
Edison Research	7–19 Jun 2021	1,500	30	70	–	−40
Institute of Polling & Marketing/IRI	15–30 Jun 2021	1,500	31	65	3	−34
Institute of Polling & Marketing/IRI	2–26 Feb 2021	1,500	31	62	7	−31
Institute of Polling & Marketing/IRI	4 Jun–2 Jul 2020	1,500	32	62	6	−30
Institute of Polling & Marketing/IRI	11 Sep–14 Oct 2019	1,500	23	70	7	−47
Institute of Polling & Marketing/IRI	20 May–11 Jun 2019	1,500	36	57	7	−19
