= Ceremonial Palace of Georgia =

Former residence of the President of Georgia and state building

- სახელმწიფო ცერემონიების სასახლე
- Presidential Palace
- Interactive map of the Ceremonial Palace of Georgia area

General information
- Status: Active
- Location: 1 M. Abdushelishvili Street, Tbilisi, Georgia 0103
- Coordinates: 41°41′45″N 44°48′41″E
- Current tenants: Ministry of Foreign Affairs of Georgia

The Ceremonial Palace of Georgia (Georgian: სახელმწიფო ცერემონიების სასახლე), formerly known as the Avlabari Presidential Residence, is a governmental building in Tbilisi that used to house the administration of President of Georgia. Located in a refurbished building of the former Imperial gendarmerie, it is located on the left bank of the Kura River, in the Avlabari district of Tbilisi, Georgia.. Since 2026, the palace houses Ministry of Foreign Affairs of Georgia

== History ==
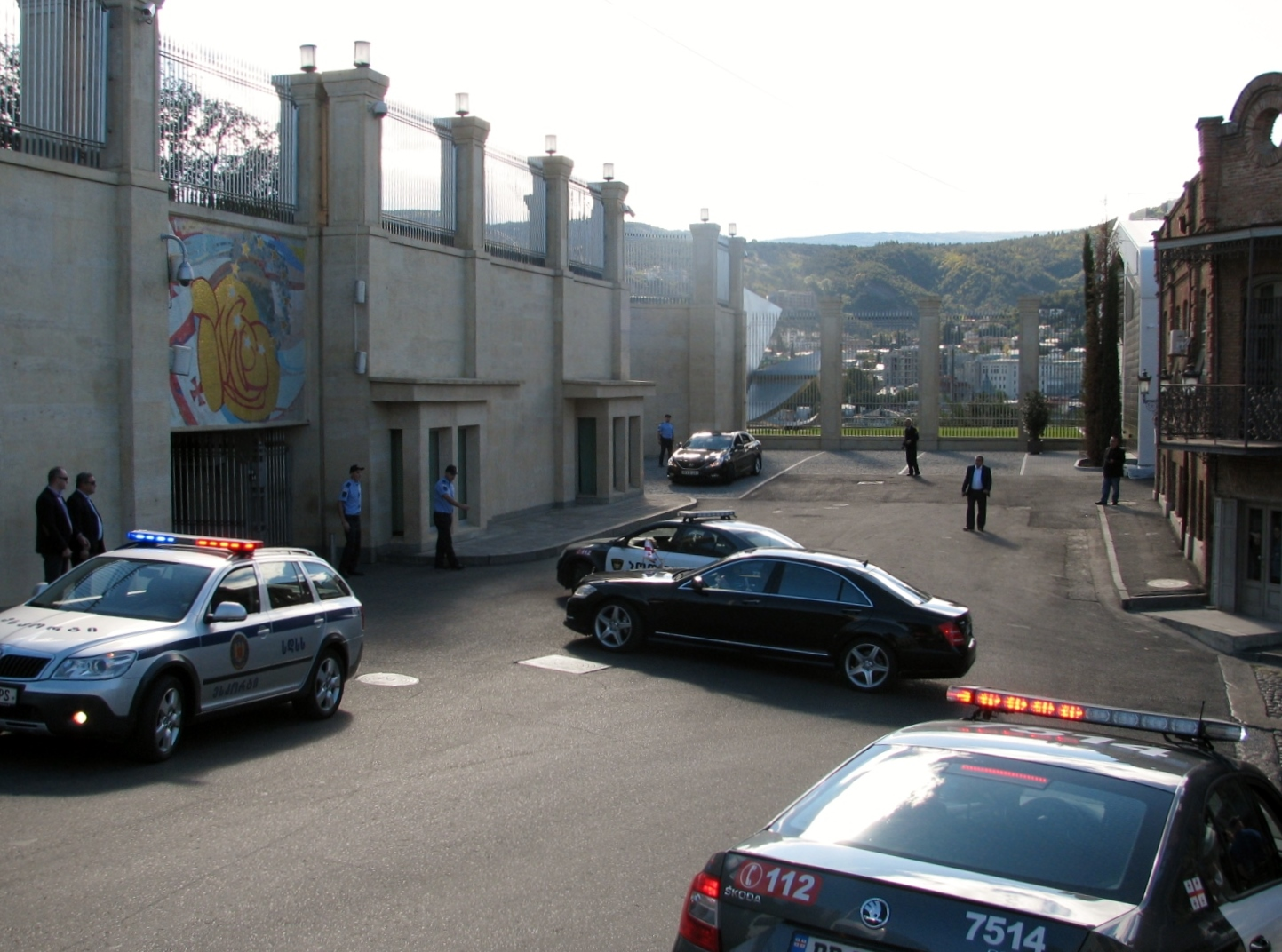
President of Georgia arriving at the Presidential Palace

The construction of the administration building commenced in 2004 on the basis of a 19th-century neoclassical edifice, which formerly housed the Imperial Gendarmerie; the work was completed in 2009. The palace was built at the initiative of President Mikheil Saakashvili. The residence officially opened on July 12, 2009, with a special ceremony being held in which up to 1,600 guests were invited, including the Catholicos-Patriarch Ilia II of Georgia, ambassadors, parliamentarians, members of the government and cultural figures. Prior to its construction, the Georgian President resided at a Soviet-era complex in nearby Krtsanisi.

=== 2019 changes ===
In 2019, the Avlabari residence was renamed and it became the Ceremonial Palace of Georgia. Members of the ruling Georgian Dream party discussed the potential function of the palace to house the Georgian National Museum. At the start of the Presidency of Salome Zourabichvili, the residence of the president was moved to the Orbeliani Palace. On 9 April 2019, the Head of the Presidential Administration Lasha Zhvania declared that "The palace will be renamed as the palace for state ceremonies."

== Design ==
The final version was designed by an Italian architect Michele De Lucchi who had also designed the headquarters of the Ministry of Internal Affairs, The Bridge of Peace in Tbilisi and Medea hotel in Batumi. Façade of the Presidential Office appears in mosaic authored by Georgian designer Natalia Amirejibi de Pita with an aphorism from the medieval Georgian poem The Knight in the Panther's Skin: "Good hath overcome ill; the essence of is lasting". The largest element of the palace are two shimmering "water mirrors"-28 long and 1,6 m high (89.6 m^{2}) mosaics in front of the complex main building called "Our background and our identity", encapsulating the entirety of Georgia's complicated and colourful history accomplished by Natalia Amirejibi de Pita.

There is a museum on the first floor of the palace, where items gifted to the President of Georgia by the leaders of different countries are exhibited. Ekvtime Takaishvili Hall is located on the second floor, which is intended for official and other important meetings. The dome of the building, constructed out of three-dimensional bent glass in Germany, was designed by a Georgian architect Vakhtang Zesashvili and Italian Architect Franc Zagari. In front of the administration building, facing the main entrance stands a rotating monument in three colors, designed by Ambassador of Georgia to Germany and granddaughter of last Emperor of Austria Charles I of Austria, Gabriela von Habsburg, representing three branches of government - legislative, executive and judicial.

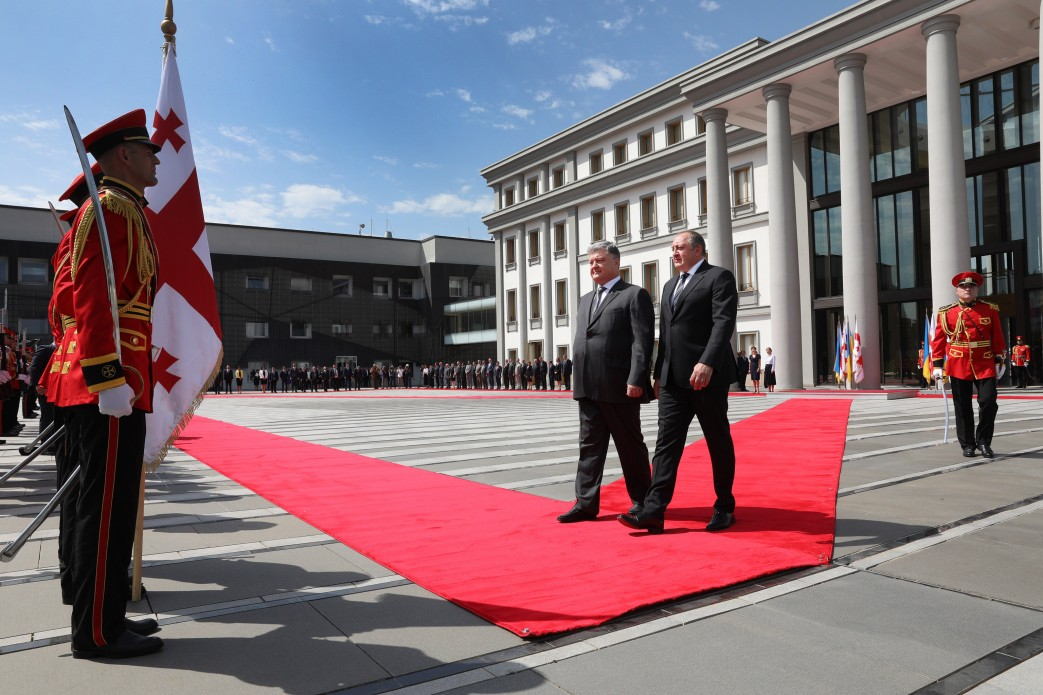
State arrival ceremonies (such as this one for the President of Ukraine) are typically held outside the Presidential Administration of Georgia.

== Controversies ==
Although the palace has been attributed to several architects, the official website of the President of Georgia identifies Italian architect Michele De Lucchi as its designer rather than Georgian architect Giga Batiashvili. De Lucchi's personal website does not list the palace among his projects, although it includes his designs for the Ministry of Internal Affairs of Georgia, the Bridge of Peace in Tbilisi, and the Medea Hotel in Batumi.

In 2004, the Architectural and Construction Inspection of the Ministry of Economic Development of Georgia filed a lawsuit against the Presidential Administration over the construction of the palace without the required authorization.

== See also ==
- Government of Georgia (country)
- Cabinet of Georgia
