= Nikoloz Baratashvili =

Georgian poet (1817–1845)

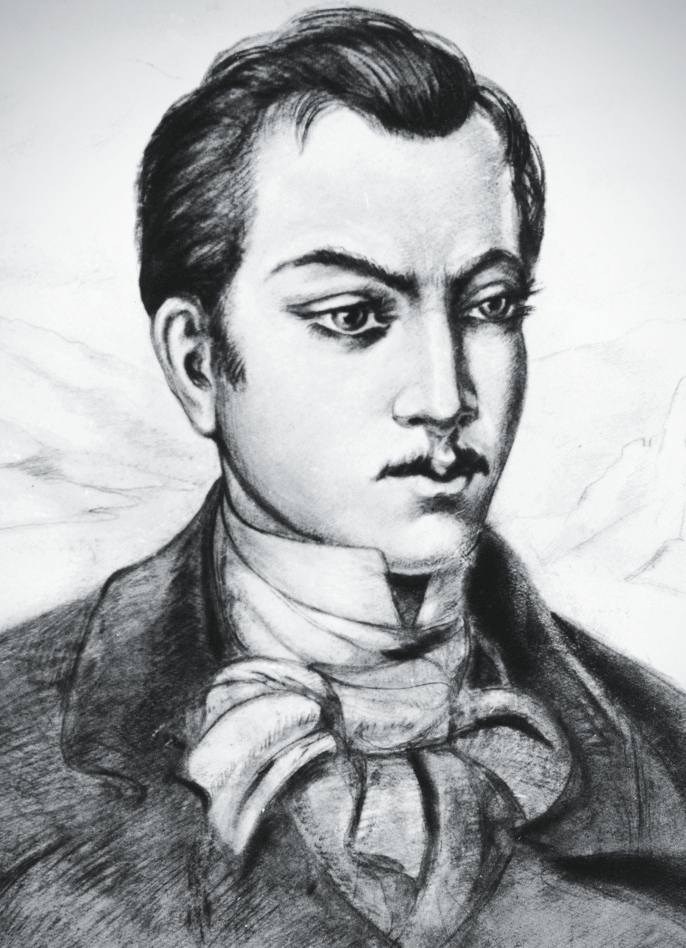
- Nikoloz Baratashvili, painted by Lado Gudiashvili
- Born: 4 December 1817; Tiflis, Georgia Governorate, Russian Empire
- Died: 21 October 1845 (aged 27); Ganja, Russian Empire
- Resting place: Mtatsminda Pantheon, Tbilisi
- Occupations: Writer, poet
- Writing career
- Movement: Romanticism

Prince Nikoloz Baratashvili (Georgian: ნიკოლოზ ბარათაშვილი; 4 December 1817 – 21 October 1845) was a Georgian poet. He was one of the first Georgians to marry modern nationalism with European Romanticism and to introduce "Europeanism" into Georgian literature. Due to his early death, Baratashvili left a relatively small literary heritage of fewer than forty short lyrics, one extended poem, and a few private letters, but he is nevertheless considered the high point of Georgian Romanticism. He was referred to as the "Georgian Byron".

== Biography ==
Nikoloz Baratashvili, affectionately known as Tato, was born in Tiflis (Tbilisi), Georgia's capital, which was then the principal city of Russian Transcaucasia. His father, Prince Meliton Baratashvili (1795–1860), was an impoverished nobleman working for the Russian administration. His mother, Ephemia Orbeliani (1801–1849), was a sister of the Georgian poet and general Prince Grigol Orbeliani and a scion of the penultimate Georgian king Erekle II.

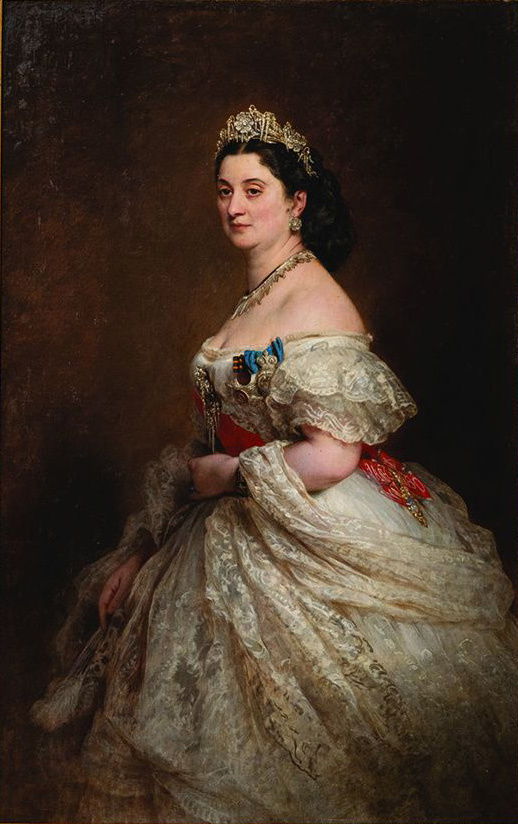
Portrait of Ekaterine Chavchavadze, the subject of Baratashvili's unrequited love, by Franz Xaver Winterhalter

In 1835, Baratashvili graduated from a Tiflis gymnasium for nobility, where he was tutored by Solomon Dodashvili, a Georgian patriot and liberal philosopher. The tragic quality of Baratashvili's poetry was determined by his traumatic personal life as well as the contemporary political situation in his homeland. The failure of the 1832 anti-Russian conspiracy of Georgian nobles, with which Baratashvili sympathized as a schoolboy, forced many conspirators to see the independent past as irremediably lost and to reconcile themselves with the Russian autocracy, transforming their laments for the lost past and the fall of the native dynasty into Romantic poetry. Shortage of money prevented Baratashvili from continuing his studies in Russian universities, while an early physical injury left him disabled and did not allow him to enter military service as he wished. Eventually, Baratashvili had to enter the Russian bureaucratic service and serve as an ordinary clerk in the Azerbaijani town of Ganja. The love of his life, Princess Ekaterine Chavchavadze, rejected him and married David Dadiani, Prince of Mingrelia.

Baratashvili died of malaria in Ganja at the age of 27. His influence was long delayed, but as the next generation of Georgian literati rediscovered his lyrics, he was posthumously published, between 1861 and 1876, and idolized. His reinterment from Ganja to Tbilisi in 1893 turned into a national celebration. Since 1938, his remains have lain in the Mtatsminda Pantheon in Tbilisi. A bridge and an avenue in Tbilisi are named after the poet, and his monument stands in the central district of the Georgian capital.

== Works ==
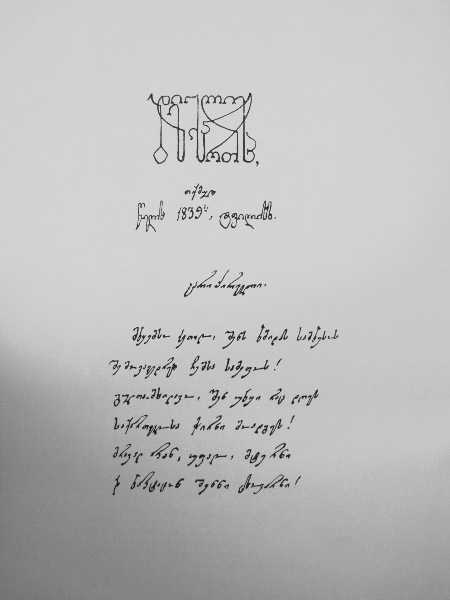
Manuscript of Baratashvili's poem Fate of Georgia, 1839

A key insight into the worldview of Baratashvili can be found in his historical poem Fate of Georgia (ბედი ქართლისა, bedi k'art'lisa; 1839), an inspiring and articulate lament for Georgia's latest misfortunates. This poem, written by Baratashvili at the age of 22, is based on a real historical event: the destruction of Tbilisi in 1795 by the Persian ruler Mohammad Khan Qajar, which forced the disappointed Georgian king Erekle II to entrust his country's security to the Russian Empire. However, national problems considered in this work are viewed with a modern approach; the poem considers not only Georgia's past, but also its future in the aftermath of the failed revolt of 1832. In this poem, Baratashvili depicts the debate of Erekle II with his chancellor, Solomon Lionidze, who opposes the union with Russia and thinks that this will result in the loss of Georgia's national identity. Lionidze's wife asks her husband, in a lament that became familiar to all literate Georgians: "What pleasure does the tender nightingale receive from honor if it is in a cage?" The sympathies of the poet and reader both fall on Solomon's side, but the objectively rational decision of the king prevails.

During his short creative life (1833–45) Baratashvili developed difficult concepts of art and ideas. In the words of the British scholar Donald Rayfield, Baratashvili "evolved a language all his own, obscure but sonorous, laconically modern, sometimes splendidly medieval, with pseudo-archaisms." In his earlier poem Dusk on Mtatsminda (შემოღამება მთაწმინდაზე, shemoghameba mt'ats'mindaze; 1833–36) the reader can feel a romantic aspiration to be freed of earthly burdens and joined with secret natural forces. Baratashvili's love poetry reached its acme with his unhappy obsessive love for Princess Chavchavadze and is impregnated with an idea of the orphaned soul as in The Orphaned Soul (სული ობოლი, suli oboli; 1839). Losing hope in human happiness, Baratashvili is captivated by superhuman historical figures such as Erekle II and Napoleon, whom he deems to be beyond joy and unhappiness. Among his most significant works are the poems The Evil Spirit (სული ბოროტი, suli boroti; 1843), Thought on the Riverside of Mtkvari (ფიქრი მტკვრის პირას, p'ik'ri mtkvris piras; 1837), and Pegasus (მერანი, merani; 1842). This latter poem fascinated later Georgian poets as a mystic, apocalyptic vision of the future. In it the omnipotent mind, inspired by faith, calls for the poem's lyrical hero to knowingly sacrifice himself in the name of his brethren. The tragic optimism of Pegasus is a striking manifestation of the romantic spirit: active, life-asserting, and full of revolutionary aspirations. Pegasus is a prominent work of Georgian Romanticism both from an ethical-philosophical view, and from an artistic-aesthetic point of view.

=== Poetry ===
- "Do not say something, sweetheart, your lover thy heart, certainly"
- "Turned out to be illuminated in the east, like the sun alive"
- "Blew the rudy wind, led me like a Flower"
- "Thought on the Riverside of Mtkvari"
- "I bless the day of my birth, I am happy, cup"
- "The grace of your Creator, beautiful, woman shavtvalebiano"
- "Merani"
- "I am happy with you presence"
- "My lover, I remember your eyes"
- "The grace of your Creator, beautiful, blackeyed woman"
- "Will Dry My Tears"
- "Colour of the sky, blue colour"
- "I have found a real church, standing in the wilderness"
- "The fate of Kartli" ("Bedi kartlisa")
- "Nightingale on the rose"
- "Duke barataevis azarpeshazed”
- "Nathan, the singer on the piano”
- "To Napoleon”
- "War of the nobleman-peasant-to-face”
- "Tomb of King Irakli”
- "Earring”
- "Orphan spirit”
- "Hyacinth and a bit”
- "Thoughts on the edge”
- "Twilight mtatsmidazed”
- "To my friends”
- "My Pray”
- "To my stars”
- "Babies”
- "Chinari”
- "Chonguri”
- "Mysterious voice”

== Ancestry ==
Ancestors of Nikoloz Baratashvili

16. Shermazan Baratashvili
8. Luarsab Baratashvili
4. Nikoloz Baratashvili
2. Meliton Baratashvili
1. Nikoloz Baratashvili
6. Zurab Orbeliani
3. Ephemia Orbeliani
28. Tamaz Andronikashvili
14. Zakaria Andronikashvili
7. Khoreshan Andronikashvili
30. Heraclius II of Georgia
15. Princess Elene of Georgia
31. Darejan Dadiani

== Editions in English ==
- Anthology of Georgian Poetry (PDF). Translated by Venera Urushadze. Introduction by Mikheil Kvesselava. Tbilisi: State Publishing House Soviet Georgia. 1958. OCLC 158568 – via National Library of Georgia.

== Links ==
- Six poems by Nikoloz Baratashvili, translated into English by Venera Urushadze (audio)
