= Bridge of Peace =

Bridge in Tbilisi, Georgia

Bridge of Peace მშვიდობის ხიდი
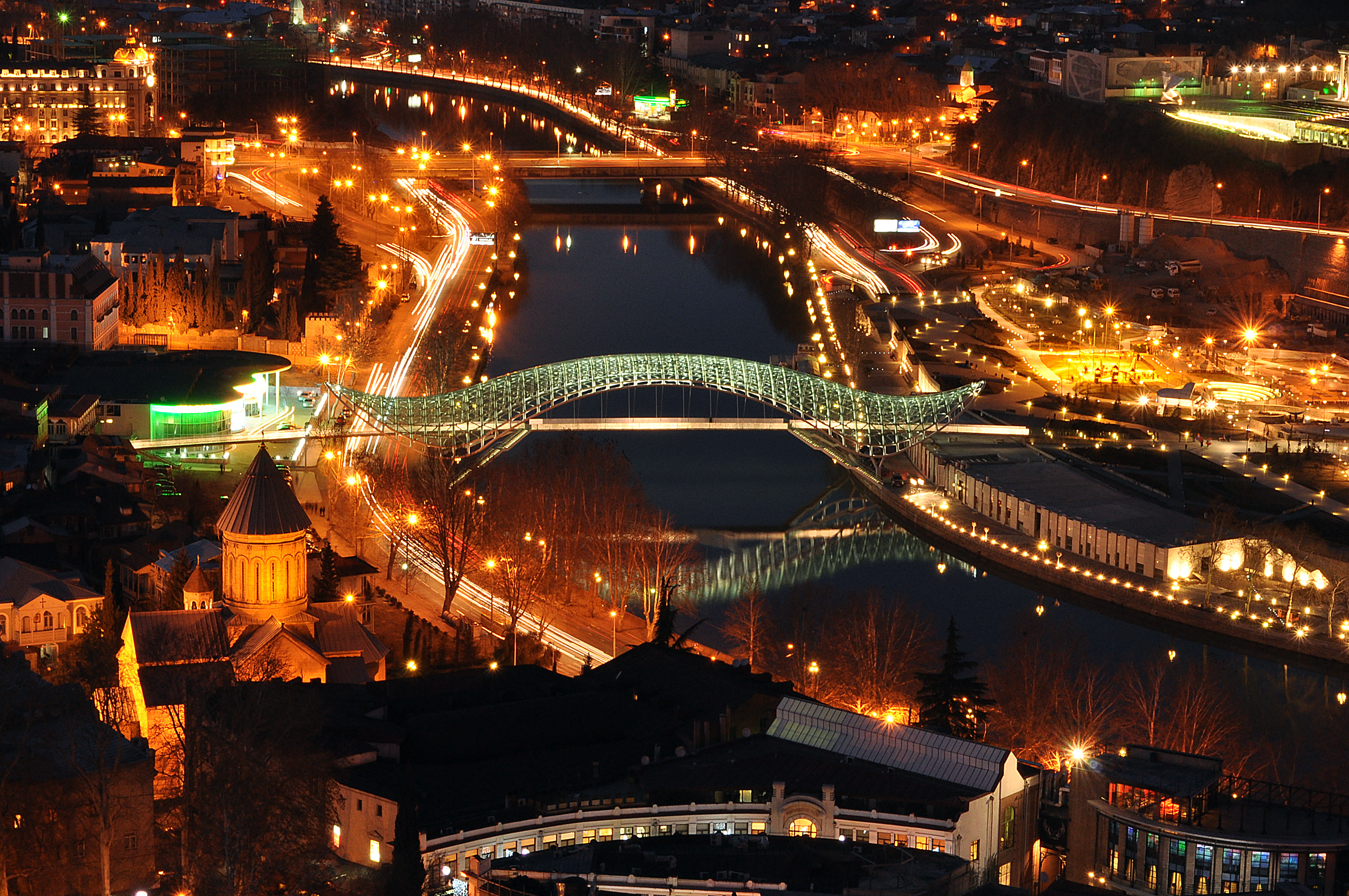
- The bow-shaped bridge connects Old Tbilisi with the new district
- Coordinates: 41.6929°N 44.8082°E
- Crosses: Kura River (Mtkvari)
- Locale: Tbilisi, Georgia
- Maintained by: Tbilisi City Administration

Characteristics
- Design: through truss, cantilever and arch bridge
- Total length: 150 metres (490 ft)

History
- Architect: Michele De Lucchi
- Opened: May 6, 2010

Location
- Interactive map of Bridge of Peace მშვიდობის ხიდი

The Bridge of Peace (Georgian: მშვიდობის ხიდი, mshvidobis khidi) is a bow-shaped pedestrian bridge, a steel and glass construction illuminated with numerous LEDs, over the Kura River, linking the Rike Park with Old town in central Tbilisi. Since its opening in 2010 the structure has become an important pedestrian crossing in the city, as well as a significant tourist attraction and one of the most well-recognized landmarks of the capital.

== History ==
The bridge, which stretches 150 metres (490 ft) over the Kura River, was ordered by the City Hall of Tbilisi to create a contemporary design feature connecting Old Tbilisi with the new district. The official opening took place on May 6, 2010. The bridge stretches over the Kura River, providing a view of the Metekhi Church, statue of the city's founder Vakhtang Gorgasali, and the Narikala Fortress on one side, and Baratashvili Bridge and Ceremonial Palace of Georgia on the other.

== Design ==
View of bridge from ground level

The bridge was designed by the Italian architect Michele De Lucchi, who had also designed the buildings of the Ceremonial Palace of Georgia and the Ministry of Internal Affairs in Tbilisi; the lighting design was created by the French lighting designer Philippe Martinaud. The structure of the bridge was built in Italy and transported to Tbilisi in 200 trucks, while the lighting was installed on site during the assembly of the structures.

The bridge, a design of which reminds one of a marine animal, has a curvy steel and glass canopy top which shimmers with an interactive light display at night, generated by thousands of white LEDs. The roof is fitted with 1,208 custom LED fixtures. The handrail glass panels, which run along the whole length of the walkway, are equipped with embedded linear low-power LED arrays.

The lighting, which is live from 90 minutes before sunset until 90 minutes after sunrise, features four different lighting programs that run on the canopy every hour. At times, the bridge lights up in waves from one side of the river to the other. At other times, the pattern begins with a band of light at either end, continuing from either direction until the light meets in the middle, and fades to black before starting over. The third program starts by lighting the outer fixtures on the roofline, then briefly illuminates the entire canopy before going entirely dark. The fourth program makes the roof twinkle like stars as different groups of fixtures light and dim across the entire bridge length.

Within the bridge walkway, the low-power linear LED arrays embedded in the glass railings are triggered by 240 motion sensors as the pedestrians pass, giving an impression that the bridge lights come on for each person setting foot on the bridge. Additionally, a message in Morse code that renders the periodic table of elements goes across two parapets every hour. The lights designer Martinaud considers this communication celebration of "life and peace between people".

== Criticism ==
Bridge of Peace at dusk

The construction of a new steel and glass bridge in the historical district of Tbilisi was controversial. Several opposition politicians, architects, and urban planners unleashed criticism, complaining that the bridge unduly dominated the historical old town and obscured the area's old architectural landmarks.

The bridge has been nicknamed the "Always Ultra" bridge for its perceived resemblance to a ladies' maxi-pad.

== See also ==
- Architecture of Georgia
