= Khatia Moistsrapishvili =

Georgian media and political figure

- ხატია მოისწრაფიშვილი
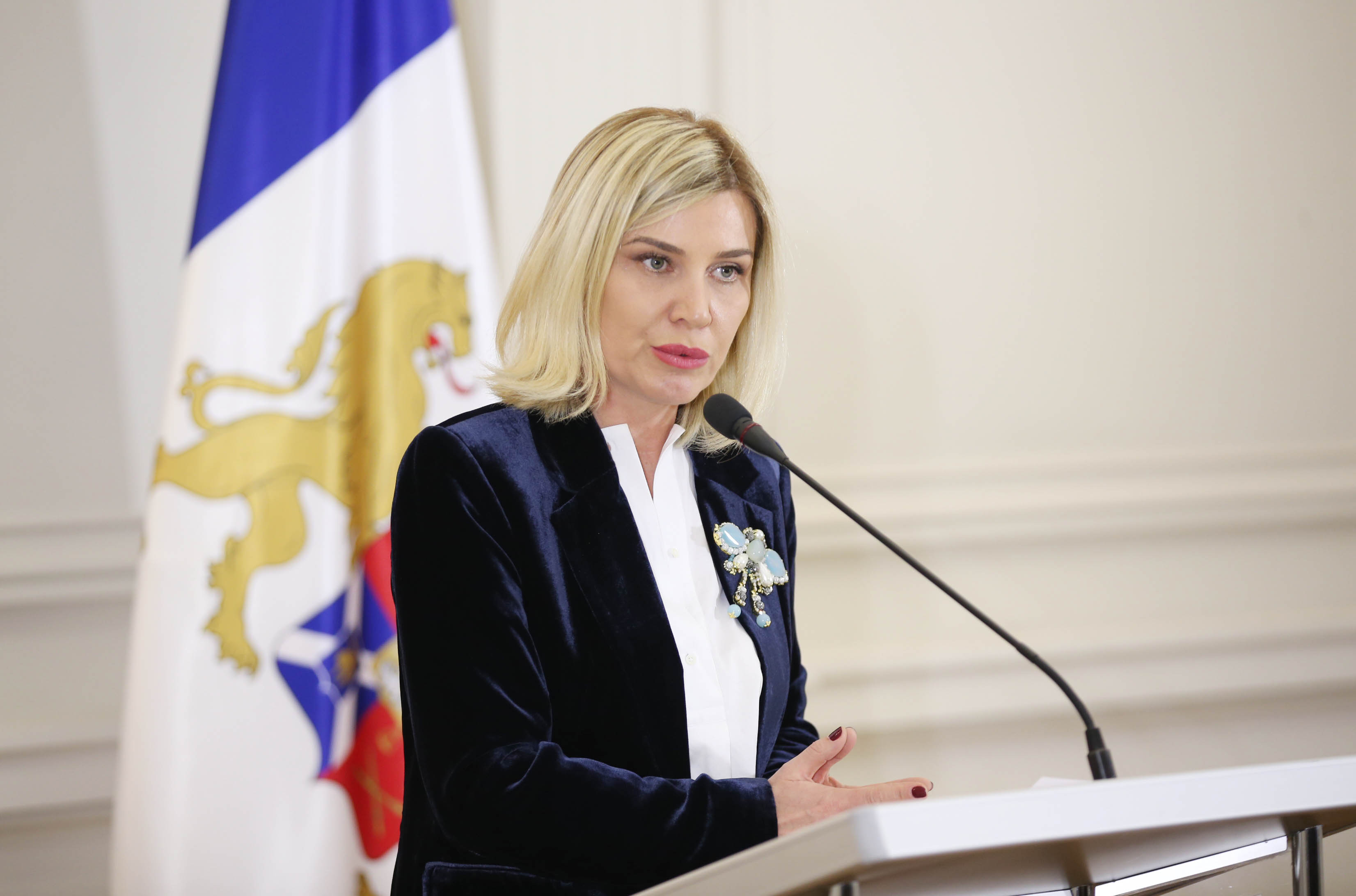
- Khatia Moistsrapishvili holding press briefing

Press Speaker for the President of Georgia
- In office 31 December 2018 – 9 September 2019
- President: Salome Zourabichvili
- Preceded by: Eka Mishveladze

Personal details
- Born: 14 January 1971 (age 55) Poti, Georgian Soviet Socialist Republic, Soviet Union
- Education: Tbilisi State University

Khatia Moistsrapishvili (Georgian: ხატია მოისწრაფიშვილი, khatia moists'raphishvili) is a Georgian media and political figure who is currently serving as the Press Speaker for Georgia's fifth president, Salome Zourabichvili (2018—2019).

== Biography ==
Khatia Moistsrapishvili was born on 14 January 1971 in the Black Sea city of Poti, in Soviet Georgia. A history student in the late 1980s at the Ivane Javakhishvili Tbilisi State University, she graduated in 1995 from a Master's program in ethnology and ethnography, before taking an interest in journalism. She would work from 1994 to 1995 as the press manager for the International Youth Foundation of Georgia, before taking a special course of TV journalism at the BBC.

Moistsrapishvili takes on several private and public jobs in the 1990s, working in the media departments of the State Chancellery of Georgia and for the Presidential Administration of Eduard Shevardnadze. At the same time, she becomes a reporter for the Georgian Public Broadcaster, before joining Imedi TV as head of its PR department, and Mze TV as an anchorwoman until 2008.

After a stint in the private sector, she becomes the head of public relations for the Tbilisi City Court from 2008 to 2010, and for the Finance Ministry until 2018.

On 31 December 2018, she was appointed by newly-elected President Salome Zourabichvili as her Press Speaker, a position equivalent to spokesperson for the Presidential Administration. Working from the Orbeliani Presidential Palace, she is the public face of the administration, holding weekly press briefings. 9 September 2019 was fired. Khatia Moistsrapishvili returned to the tax office.

Khatia Moistsrapishvili
(@GeoPressSpeaker)
tweeted:

Press #briefings are held from the Atoneli Street @GeorgiaPres Palace every Tuesday. #Media 📺📻📰

5 February 2019
